= 1973 in poetry =

Nationality words link to articles with information on the nation's poetry or literature (for instance, Irish or France).

== Events ==
- September 16 – Chilean poet Víctor Jara, having been detained four days earlier as a political prisoner in Estadio Chile and tortured during the 1973 Chilean coup d'état, is shot and killed. His last poem Estadio Chile is preserved in memories and scraps of paper retained by fellow detainees.
- Canadian poet and author, Michael Ondaatje adapts his 1970 book of poetry, The Collected Works of Billy the Kid, into a play which this year is first produced in Stratford, Ontario; it will appear in New York in 1974 and in London, England in 1984.
- White Pine Press founded in Buffalo, New York. The publisher is a nonprofit organization putting out poetry, fiction, essays, and literature in translation.
- The French journal L'éphémère, founded in 1966, ceases publication this year; poets associated with it include Yves Bonnefoy, Jacques Dupin and André du Bouchet.

== Works published in English ==
Listed by nation where the work was first published and again by the poet's native land, if different; substantially revised works listed separately:

=== Australia ===
- Rodney Hall, A Soapbox Omnibus
- Peter Porter, Jonah (with Arthur Boyd)
- John Tranter:
  - Red Movie and other poems, Angus & Robertson
  - The Blast Area, Gargoyle Poets number 13, Makar Press
- Chris Wallace-Crabbe:
  - Selected Poems, Sydney: Angus & Robertson
  - Vinyl record: Chris Wallace-Crabbe Reads From His Own Verse, St.Lucia

=== Canada ===
- Alfred Bailey, Thanks for a Drowned Island.
- Earle Birney:
  - The Bear on the Delhi Road: selected poems. London: Chatto & Windus.
  - what's so big about GREEN?. Toronto: McClelland and Stewart.
- Shirley Gibson, I Am Watching
- John Glassco, Montreal. Montreal: DC Books.
- Irving Layton, Lovers and lesser Men. Toronto: McClelland & Stewart.
- Dorothy Livesay, Nine Poems of Farewell. Windsor, ON: Black Moss Press.
- Eli Mandel, Crusoe: Poems Selected and New
- Miriam Mandel, Lions at Her Face. Edmonton: White Pelican Publications.
- John Metcalf (ed.), The Speaking Earth, anthology
- Michael Ondaatje, Rat Jelly, Toronto: Coach House Press
- Al Purdy, Sex and Death
- F. R. Scott, The Dance Is One. Toronto: McClelland and Stewart.
- Raymond Souster, The Colour of the Times. Ten Elephants on Yonge Street. Toronto: McGraw-Hill Ryerson.
- Raymond Souster and Richard Woollatt, eds. Sights and Sounds. Toronto: Macmillan.
- Doris Huestis Speirs, Exercise for Psyche

=== Caribbean ===
- Mervyn Morris, The Pond, Jamaica
- Andrew Salkey (ed.), Breaklight, Doubleday, anthology
- Dennis Scott, Uncle Time, Jamaica
- Derek Walcott, Another Life, St. Lucia

=== India in English ===
- Kamala Das:
  - The Old Playhouse and Other Poems, New Delhi: Orient Longman
  - Alphabet of Love, New Delhi: Orient Paper Backs
- Richard L. Bartholomew, Poems, Calcutta: Writers Workshop, India .
- Brooks Frederick, Rocket to the Moon, Calcutta: Writers Workshop, India
- Alokeranjan Das Gupta, Poems, Calcutta: Dialogue Pub.
- A. K. Ramanujan, Speaking of Siva, Penguin

=== Ireland ===
- Patric Dickinson, A Wintering Tree, Irish poet published in the United Kingdom
- Seamus Heaney, a book of poetry, Northern Ireland native published in the United Kingdom
- Thomas Kinsella:
  - Selected Poems 1956–1968, including "Chrysalides"
  - New Poems 1973, including "Notes from the Land of the Dead"
- Paul Muldoon, New Weather, Northern Irish native published in the United Kingdom

=== New Zealand ===
- James K. Baxter, Two Obscene Poems, posthumous,
- Alan Brunton, Messengers in Blackface, work by a New Zealand poet published in the United Kingdom
- Allen Curnow, An Abominable Temper & Other Poems
- Winston Curnow (ed.), Essays on New Zealand Literature, Auckland: Heinemann Educational Books (scholarship)
- Keith Sinclair, The Firewheel Tree

=== United Kingdom ===
- Dannie Abse, Funland, and Other Poems
- Peter Ackroyd, London Lickpenny
- Martin Booth, Coronis, including the long poem, "On the Death of Archdeacon Broix"
- Edwin Brock, a book of poetry
- Alan Brunton, Messengers in Blackface, work by a New Zealand poet published in the United Kingdom
- Cal Clothier, Behind Heslington Hall
- Tony Curtis, Walk Down a Welsh Wind, Welsh
- Patric Dickinson, A Wintering Tree, Irish poet published in the United Kingdom
- Carol Ann Duffy, Fleshweathercock
- Lawrence Durrell, Vega, and Other Poems
- D. J. Enright, The Terrible Shears
- Elaine Feinstein, The Celebrants and Other Poems, Hutchinson
- Michael Fried, Powers
- Roy Fuller, Tiny Tears
- Geoffrey Grigson, Sad Grave of an Imperial Mongoose
- Michael Hamburger, Ownerless Earth
- Seamus Heaney, a book of poetry, Northern Irish native published in the United Kingdom
- Ted Hughes, Prometheus on his Crag
- Thomas Kinsella, a book of poetry Irish poet published in the United Kingdom
- Geoffrey Holloway, To Have Eyes
- Michael Longley, An Exploded View
- George MacBeth, Shrapnel
- Edwin Morgan, From Glasgow to Saturn
- Pete Morgan, The Grey Mare Being the Better Steed
- Paul Muldoon, New Weather, Northern Irish native published in the United Kingdom
- Brian Patten, The Unreliable Nightingale
- Peter Redgrove, a book of poetry
- Alan Ross, The Taj Express
- Anne Ridler, a book of poetry
- Carol Rumens, A Strange Girl in Bright Colours
- Vernon Scannell, The Winter Man
- Michael Schmidt, It Was My Tree
- Sydney Tremayne, Selected and New Poems
- Derek Walcott, Another Life

==== Anthologies ====
- Philip Larkin, The Oxford Book of Twentieth Century English Verse anthology of poets from the British Isles or who spent time there, ISBN 0-19-812137-7
- Jon Silkin (ed.), Poetry of the Committed Individual
- John Bishop and Virginia Broadbent (eds), London Between the Lines
- Howard Sergeant (ed.), African Voices

=== United States ===
- Frank Bidart, Golden State
- Robert Bly, Sleepers Joining Hands
- Joseph Payne Brennan, A Sheaf of Snow Poems
- Joseph Brodsky: Poems, Ann Arbor, Michigan: Ardis Russian-American
- Victor Hernandez Cruz, Mainland
- Irving Feldman, Lost Originals
- Lawrence Ferlinghetti, Open Eye, Open Heart
- Allen Ginsberg, The Fall of America
- John Logan, The Anonymous Lover, including "New Poem" and "Heart to Heart Talk with My Liver"
- Robert Lowell:
  - The Dolphin, containing 103 new poems
  - History, containing 360 poems, including more than 80 new ones and many revised
  - For Lizzie and Harriet, 67 old poems, all revised
- W. S. Merwin, Writings to an Unfinished Accompaniment, New York: Atheneum
- Joyce Carol Oates, Angel Fire
- George Quasha, Somapoetics
- Adrienne Rich, "Rape"
- Muriel Rukeyser, Breaking Open
- Patti Smith, Witt
- Mark Strand, The Story of Our Lives, Canadian native living in and published in the United States
- Alice Walker, Revolutionary Petunias and Other Poems

==== Anthologies ====
- George Quasha & Jerome Rothenberg, (eds.) America a Prophecy: A New Reading of American Poetry from Pre-Columbian Times to the Present (Random House/Viking)
- Ronald Gross & George Quasha, (eds.) Open Poetry: Four Anthologies of Expanded Poems (Simon & Schuster)

== Works published in other languages ==
Listed by nation where the work was first published and again by the poet's native land, if different; substantially revised works listed separately:

=== French language ===
==== Canada ====
- Michel Bealieu:
  - Variables
  - Pulsions
- Yves-Gabriel Brunet, Poésies I, collected poems from 1958 to 1962
- Gilles Constantineau, Nouveaux Poèmes
- Roland Giguère, La Main au feu, collected poems from 1949 to 1968
- Gilbert Langevin:
  - Les Ecrits de Zéro Legel
  - Novembre
- Raymond LeBlanc, Cri de terre
- Luc Racine, Le Pays saint

==== France ====
- Conseil international des femmes, Anthologie de la poésie féminine mondiale, Saint-Germain-des-Prés
- Jean Daive, Fut bâti, about the author's friendship with Paul Celan; part memoir, part prose-poem; Gallimard
- Michel Deguy, Tombeau de du Bellay
- Georges-Emmanuel Clancier, Peut-Être une demeure
- Jean Loisy, Le Double Jeu
- Katia Granoff Méditerranée
- Eugene Guilleveic, Inclus
- Edmond Jabès, (El, ou le drier livre)
- Michel Leiris, Haut-mal
- François Pradelle, Les Naïves Amours
- Denis Roche, Le Mécrit
- Pierrette Sartin, Le Destin accepté
- Philippe Soupault, Poèmes et Poésies: 1917–1973, publisher: Grasset

=== German language ===
==== East Germany ====
- Wolf Biermann, a communist living in East Germany, he could only publish these works in the West:
  - Für meine Genossen
  - Deutschland: ein Wintermärchen, long satirical poem on the division of Germany

==== West Germany, Austria, Switzerland ====
- Peter Huchel, Gezähte Tage
- Marie Luise Kaschnitz, Kein Zauberspruch
- Eric Fried, Die Freiheit den Mund aufzumachen
- Günter Herburger, Operette
- J. P. Stössel, Friedenserklärung

=== India ===
In each section, listed in alphabetical order by first name:

==== Assamese ====
- Maheswar Neog, Pracya Sasanavali
- Nabakanta Barua, Mor Aru Prithivir ("Of Mine and the Earth")
- Narayan Bezbarua, Punaruthan
- Nilmani Phookan, Phuli Thaka Suryamukhi Phultor Phale, Guwahati, Assam: Guwahati Book Stall

==== Other in India ====
- Amrita Pritan, Kagaz te Kanvas, Punjabi
- K. Siva Reddy, Raktam Suryudu, Hyderabad: Jhari Poetry Circle, Telugu-language
- Yumlembam Ibomcha Singh, Sandrembi Thoraklo Nahum Ponjel Sabige, Imphal: V.I. Publications; Meitei language

=== Italy ===
- Eugenio Montale, Diario del '71 e del '72 (poetry) Milan: Arnoldo Mondadori Editore (a private edition of 100 copies was published in 1971)
- Almanacco dello Specchio for 1973, an anthology of poetry, including translated poetry
- Franco Fortini, Questo muro, collected poems from 1962 to 1972
- Pier Paolo Pasolini, Trasumanar e organizzar
- Libero De Libero, Scempio e lusinga, collected poems written from 1930 to 1956
- Marino Moretti, Le poverazze

=== Soviet Union ===
- M. Bazhan, The Spark from Uman Recollections (translated into Russian from Ukrainian), 1973
- P. Brovka, We Are Children of One Mother (translated into Russian from Belarusian)
- B. Istru, Pain of a Shadow (translated into Russian from Moldavian)
- R. Margiani, From the Book of Brotherhood (translated into Russian from Georgian)
- S. Orlov, Loyalty

=== Spanish language ===
- José Carlos Becerra, El otoño recorre las islas, collected poetry from 1960 to 1970, edited by José Emilio Pacheco and Gabriel Zaid
- Alfonso Calderón, Isla de los Bienaventurados ("Island of the Blessed"), Chile
- Matilde Camus, Bestiario poético ("Poetic Book of Aaimals")
- Ernesto Cardenal, Canto nacional, Nicaragua
- Rosario Castellanos, "Valium 10"
- Rafael Méndez Dorich, Globos cautivos, posthumously published (Lima), Peru
- Enrique Fierro, Mutaciones, Uruguay
- Ulalume González de León, Plagio, Uruguay
- Alvaro Mutis, Summa de magroll el Gaviero, Colombia
- José Miguel Oviedo, Estos trece
- José Emilio Pacheco, Irás y no volverás, Mexico
- Justo Jorge Padrón, Mar de la noche
- Gabriel Zaid, Práctica mortal, Mexico

=== Other ===
- Ruy de Moura Belo, Portugal:
  - País possível ("The Possible Country"), consisting of a single, long poem, Pequena História Trágico-Trerrestre ("Brief Tragi-Terrestrial History")
  - Transporte no tempo ("Borne through Time")
- Odysseus Elytis, The Trills Of Love (Τα Ρω του Έρωτα), Greece
- Klaus Høeck, Rejse l-V, publisher: Grevas; Denmark

== Awards and honors ==
=== English language ===
==== Australia ====
- Grace Leven Prize for Poetry: Rodney Hall, A Soapbox Omnibus

==== Canada ====
- See 1973 Governor General's Awards for a complete list of winners and finalists for those awards.

==== United Kingdom ====
- Cholmondeley Award: Patric Dickinson, Philip Larkin
- Eric Gregory Award: John Beynon, Ian Caws, James Fenton, Keith Harris, David Howarth, Philip Pacey
- Queen's Gold Medal for Poetry: John Heath-Stubbs

==== United States ====
- Consultant in Poetry to the Library of Congress (later the post would be called "Poet Laureate Consultant in Poetry to the Library of Congress"): Daniel Hoffman appointed this year.
- American Academy of Arts and Letters Gold Medal in Poetry, John Crowe Ransom
- Bollingen Prize: James Merrill
- National Book Award for Poetry: A. R. Ammons, Collected Poems, 1951-1971
- Pulitzer Prize for Poetry: Maxine Kumin, Up Country
- Fellowship of the Academy of American Poets: W. S. Merwin

=== French language ===
==== France ====
- Max Jacob prize: Hubert Juin for Le Cinquième Poème
- Guillaume Apollinaire prize: Marc Alyn
- Grand Priz of the French Academy: André Frénaud
- Grand Aigle d'Or: Eugène Guillevic

== Births ==
- January 1 – Bryan Thao Worra, Laotian-American author, poet and playwright
- January 7 – Natalia Belchenko, Ukrainian poet and translator
- November 17 – Paul Vermeersch, Canadian poet
- date not known:
  - Ben Doller, born Ben Doyle, American
  - Duo Yu, Chinese
  - Sonnet L'Abbé, Canadian

== Deaths ==
Birth years link to the corresponding "[year] in poetry" article:

- March 26 – Noël Coward, 73, English actor, playwright, poet and composer of popular music, of a heart attack
- May 20 – Charles Brasch, 63, New Zealand poet, literary editor and arts patron
- May 23 – Kenneth Allott, 60 (born 1912) Welsh poet, academic and authority on Matthew Arnold
- June 4 – Arna Bontemps, 70 (born 1902), American poet and member of the Harlem Renaissance, of a heart attack
- August 17 – Conrad Aiken, 84, American fiction writer and poet, of a heart attack
- September 2 – J. R. R. Tolkien, 81, English novelist, poet and academic
- September 16 – Víctor Jara, 40, Chilean writer, poet and Communist politician, by political murder
- September 20 – William Plomer, 69, South African-born British poet, novelist, literary editor and librettist, sometimes writing as Robert Pagan
- September 23 – Pablo Neruda, 69, Chilean writer, poet and Communist politician, from leukemia
- September 28 – W. H. Auden, 66, English poet, often cited as one of the most influential of the century
- October 17 – Ingeborg Bachmann, 47 (born 1926) Austrian poet and author
- November 22 – Ramon Guthrie, 77, American poet, author and academic
- November 23 – Francis Webb, 48, Australian poet
- November 24 – John G. Neihardt (born 1881), American author and poet
- December 11 – May Wedderburn Cannan, 80 (born 1893), English war poet
- December 14 – Josef Magnus Wehner, 82 (born 1891), German poet and playwright
- December 30 – Vagaland, pen name of Thomas Alexander Robertson, 64 (born 1909), Shetland Scottish poet

== See also ==
- Poetry
- List of poetry awards
- List of years in poetry
