= Viewer (video installation) =

Video installation by artist Gary Hill

- Artist: Gary Hill
- Year: 1996
- Medium: Multi-channel video installation
- Dimensions: approx. 14' h. x 25' w. x 45' l. (gallery space)
- Location: Museum of Modern Art, Louisiana Museum of Modern Art collections
- Website: Viewer, Gary Hill website

Viewer (1996) is a five-channel, projective video installation created by American new-media artist Gary Hill. The work was first exhibited in a solo exhibition at Barbara Gladstone Gallery in 1996, along with three related works, Standing Apart, Facing Faces and Standing Apart/Facing Faces, which combined the first two. The following year, it was selected for the 4th biennale d’art contemporain de Lyon. It has since been exhibited at venues including the Museum of Modern Art, Aarhus Kunstmuseum, Kunstmuseum Wolfsburg and Center for Contemporary Art Tel Aviv, among others.

The installation consists of color, roughly life-size projections of seventeen day-laborers lined side-by-side against a black background along a 45-foot-long wall in a darkened gallery. The men look out impassively and silently, almost motionless, and seem to return the scrutinizing gaze of viewers, creating a circuit of continuous feedback. Hill's title, Viewer, references this reflexive quality, being ambiguously applicable to the installation's projected subjects and its spectators. (Note: The titles Viewer and Standing Apart/Facing Faces were arrived at in collaboration with artist and poet George Quasha.)

Gary Hill, Viewer, Five-channel video installation, color, silent; total projection length approx. 540", 1996.

== Background ==
Writers such as art historian Lynne Cooke consider Hill a pioneer in video and new-media, based on works from the 1970s onward. He began as a sculptor, but by 1973, was integrating video into objects, performances and installations and introducing concrete physical elements into electronic space. His art has explored subjects such as consciousness, perception, visual and verbal language, time and the body, using nascent technologies including computer software, projection, CGI and virtual reality. Although Hill was influenced by conceptual art and minimalism, he is known for an independent approach more engaged by philosophy and literature (e.g., texts by Gregory Bateson, Maurice Blanchot and Wittgenstein) than by art and film concerns such as representation, narrative and description.

Viewer followed in the wake of Hill's projective installations Beacon (Two Versions of the Imaginary) (1990) and Tall Ships (1992), works through which he freed both video and audiences from the constraint of the television monitor. Like Tall Ships, Viewer centers on an encounter with life-size projected full figures and differed from previous work with its absence of sound, text, monitors or visible means of production. Both works, as well as HanD HearD (1995–96), foreground the participation of spectators enfolded into the activated installation space, where they are prompted to self-consciously reflect on the act of viewing and being viewed.

== Description ==
Visitors encounter Viewer in a darkened gallery space approximately 45' long by 25' wide by 14' tall. Filling the 45' wall are seventeen male day-laborers projected in color and slightly larger than life-size onto a neutral black background. The men appear to stand side-by-side in a largely continuous horizontal row, facing out and looking impassively ahead. Of various ethnic backgrounds—Latino, Black and Native American—the men are clearly not actors or models based on their stance, dress and somewhat uneasy air. They stand in silence, largely motionless, with no interaction, their movement limited to incidental shuffling from foot to foot, slight stirring of hands, and barely perceptible shifts in facial expression.

Gary Hill, Viewer, multi-channel video installation, approx. 45' x 25' x 14', installation view, 1996.

The installation images are cast by five video projectors attached to the ceiling. The seventeen discrete figure images were recorded separately and then composited in three groups of three and two groups of four figures. Five media players containing the images are synchronized so that the figures appear to stand side-by-side in a line.

== Critical reception ==
Critical discussion of Viewer has centered on its reflexive engagement with viewing, its emphasis on physical presence, and related to that, its open encounter with otherness.

The visual and aural starkness of the installation condenses the viewer's sensory experience to a disconcerting exchange of gazes, inducing uncertainty and self-consciousness with regard to their activity as gallery spectators and internal thought processes. George Quasha and Charles Stein ascribe some of the effect to the fascination created by cast images of a person, noting a momentary confusion in which viewers maintain the awareness of viewing a projection, yet simultaneously experience the person is as powerfully present. They write, "In Viewer there is an uncomfortable intensity, of something a bit too real, as seventeen (all male) waiting day-workers stare at us as we pass, their eyes following us everywhere and their lives, their waiting, pressing against us."

Critics contend that Hill's neutral method of recording and presentation—in terms of action, expression, manipulation, environment and context—strips the work of overt documentary or political content, placing emphasis on the raw fact of the men's existence in the space and viewers' encounter with it. Robert Mittenthal suggested that the men possess a "vibrant" immobility that elicits a sense of restlessness and elongation of time recalling Warhol's film portraits. He elaborated, "Each of these men stand, staring back, energy never entirely dissipating. Eerily alive in a sort of tableau vivant or chorus line, these men are present in their absence. Without audio clues or any other distractions, we are forced to read faces and bodies that ooze physical presence."

Writers suggest that the confrontational directness of the day-laborers' presence in Viewer contributes an anthropological charge that was new to Hill's art—an open engagement with otherness that involved difference, as well as subjectivity and co-presence. Whereas the projected figures in past works like Tall Ships were family, friends and acquaintances, the subjects of Viewer were strangers, of different class and cultural affiliations. Hill recruited them from a group of men who congregated at a community center near his Seattle studio called The Millionaires Club, where they offered their labor on a daily basis. He hired them individually for an hour of recording, instructing each to maintain eye contact with him and the camera for 20-30 minutes, a duration rare even among friends or lovers. He sought to capture the experience of strangers making contact by looking at and apprehending one another, an uncomfortable exchange which is reenacted with viewers of the installation.

Hill explored the intense phenomenon further in the installation Is a Bell Ringing in the Empty Sky (2005), which consisted of two full-body, simultaneously recorded 30-minute images of the French actress Isabelle Huppert. One image was shot from slightly above her head, the other from thigh-level, signaling different degrees of authority. They were projected onto two large vertical screens (one leaning against the wall at a slight upward angle), yielding a multi-perspectival, nuanced portrait in motion.

== Exhibitions and collections ==
After its appearance at the Musée d'art contemporain de Lyon (France) in 1997, Viewer was exhibited at the Aarhus Kunstmuseum (Denmark, 1999), Kunstmuseum Wolfsburg (2001, Germany), San Francisco Museum of Modern Art (2005), MIS - Museu da Imagem e do Som (2010, São Paulo), Center for Contemporary Art Tel Aviv (2013), Suwon Art Museum (2019), and Art Museum of Guangzhou Academy of Fine Arts (2024), among other venues. It appeared in surveys including "Voici, 100 ans d'art contemporain" (Palais des Beaux-Arts, Brussels, 2000), "Take Two. Worlds and Views" (Museum of Modern Art, 2005), and "Beyond Cinema: The Art of Projection" (Museum für Gegenwart, Berlin, 2006).

Viewer belongs to the art collections of the Museum of Modern Art, Louisiana Museum of Modern Art (Denmark), and Rachel and Jean-Pierre Lehmann.

Footnotes
