= Incidence of Catastrophe =

Video work by artist Gary Hill

- Artist: Gary Hill
- Year: 1987–88
- Medium: Single-channel video
- Location: Centre Georges Pompidou, Musée d'art contemporain de Montréal, Museum of Modern Art, Smithsonian American Art Museum, Stedelijk Museum art collections, among others
- Website: Incidence of Catastrophe, Gary Hill website

Gary Hill, Incidence of Catastrophe, single-channel video, color, stereo sound, 43:51 minutes, 1987–88.

Incidence of Catastrophe (1987–88, 43:51 min.) is a single-channel video by American new-media artist Gary Hill. It is one of several works by Hill inspired by the work of French writer and philosopher Maurice Blanchot, in this case, his experimental novel Thomas l'obscur (1941), in which the protagonist is the reader of a novel he is in. Like the novel, Incidence of Catastrophe presents a loose, dreamlike scenario rather than a continuous narrative, in which a largely mute protagonist, Thomas, undergoes psychological and physical disintegration in response to his encounter with a literary text. Echoing the self-reflexivity of Blanchot's book, Hill portrays Thomas himself in the video.

The video was first exhibited at the Long Beach Museum of Art in 1988, and the following year, selected for the Whitney Biennial. It was subsequently shown at international venues including the Aarhus Kunstmuseum, Centre Georges Pompidou, Museum of Contemporary Art, Los Angeles, Museum of Modern Art, São Paulo Museum of Modern Art, and the Venice Biennale.

== Background ==
Hill is regarded as a foundational figure in video and new-media art. His work has employed a range of technologies and drawn on philosophical texts to explore verbal and visual language, consciousness, the body, and time, among other subjects. He began as a sculptor, but by 1973, was integrating video into objects, performances and installations and introducing concrete physical elements into electronic space.

Incidence of Catastrophe followed in the wake of Hill's single-channel videos of the 1970s and 1980s. The earlier work, which explored the structure of meaning through the interplay of image, text, sound, and electronic phenomena, was followed by projects such as Primarily Speaking (1981–83), Why Do Things Get in a Muddle? (Come on Petunia) (1984) and URA ARU (the backside exists) (1985–86), which examined disorder and the limitations of language. Incidence arose from Hill's intense experience of reading Blanchot's novel, during which he said he felt the book was also reading him. Critics suggest that the video prefigures Hill's installations using projection of and onto text (e.g., I Believe It Is an Image in Light of the Other, 1991–92), as well as later works that feature repetition, entropy, physical impasse, and Hill as the central figure (e.g., Wall Piece, 2000; Place Holder, 2019).

== Description ==
Incidence of Catastrophe is considered somewhat unusual for Hill, given its extended duration (nearly forty-four minutes), small cast, and basis in a scenario organized around discrete episodes and dramatic images. Although it never approaches a coherent plot and is highly self-reflexive, Incidence is perhaps the work in which he came closest to the narrative structures of film and drama. Critics characterize the video as a "non-linguistic translation" or "trans-creation" of Blanchot's work—akin to a double or dialogue rather than a faithful recreation—adapting themes, motifs (the sea, swimming, reading) and devices from the novel.

In the opening sequences, Hill intercuts images of tides filling the screen as they break over sandbanks with extreme close-ups of text and book pages (from Blanchot's novel) being turned and flooded by waves. The images, linked by the use of soft-edged wipes and both prominently audible on the soundtrack, evoke immersion—in water or in reading. The reader, Thomas, becomes increasingly tormented by the book, which he seems to perceive as a physical threat that overwhelms or grips him with an excess of meaning and sensory events. At times, specific words in close-up ("flood", "eyes fixed") call forth imagery or analogies, nightmarish scenes in which he: is watched by words that transform into a dark, tangled forest; struggles to move forward, physically or through the text; or is cut by the book. He soon becomes incapable of distinguishing between dream, hallucination, and reality.

Gary Hill, Incidence of Catastrophe, single-channel video, still image, color, sound; 43:51 min, 1987–88.

In a later sequence, Thomas attends a dinner party, awkwardly lurking in the background before finally sitting down, still immersed in his book. The previously flowing conversation halts and devolves into isolated words and unintelligibility until he falls back in his chair, pulling the tablecloth and sending its contents crashing to the ground. The party regresses into a state of pre-civilized madness, with the guests in states of undress crawling on the floor and playing with the food; the scene is interrupted when Thomas again pulls the tablecloth and plunges with it into the sea. In the final scenes, the book drives him to vomiting and babbling gibberish, his only articulations in the video. (Note: In actuality, Hill is talking backwards phonetically, naming the parts of his body (mouth, stomach, legs, etc.) where a stick pokes him, one at a time.) He cowers naked in a fetal position on a white-tiled bathroom floor; a long wooden stick affixed to the camera pokes at his body as the pages of the book become monumental walls looming over him. Critic and curator Lynne Cooke observed, "Thomas's mind and body disintegrate as they are invaded and dominated by the voracious text: after robbing him of speech, it renders his mind incoherent and his body incontinent."

== Critical commentary ==
Critical discussion of Incidence of Catastrophe centers on two recurring themes in Hill's work: the assertion of the material, physical world and a critical engagement with language. Throughout the video, Hill's imagery, sound, editing, and framing immerse the viewer in the tangible sensations of the act of reading: the texture and pattern of paper and text, the shuffling of the pages, the scanning of words. Just as Hill depicts Thomas's body as almost literally ravaged by the novel, he acts upon the book and its text with visual and physical effects, including extreme lighting, focus, and edit wipes of flooding water. Art historian John Hanhardt remarked, "the artist himself is enfolded within the phenomenology of the written/printed text; as his body and eye merge to become one, the screen struggles with the folio sheet, the press-type on the page—with the impression of language on our consciousness." The effect is one of eroding boundaries—between physicality and consciousness, text and bodies (the book's and Hill's own), and the differentiated spaces of book, author, and reader.

Writers such as Josée Bélisle contend that Incidence centers on the constitutive power and disruptive capacity of written and spoken language, including the act of reading: "For Hill, what is ultimately important is the revelation … of all aspects of language that shape a being and render possible its relation with the world." Robert C. Morgan deemed the video a "powerful indictment of speech turned inward upon itself" that functions as both an allegory of language's solipsism and a discourse on consciousness. George Quasha and Charles Stein, however, note a sense of potentiality in the work: "If disorientation is what (catastrophically) returns us to the emergent, it is the fundamental aesthetic fact and key opportunity of this piece. And the core ambiguity of Incidence of Catastrophe––its violent and fragmented textual luminosity, fecund personal darkness, and hunger for what is concealed in language––bespeaks an open intentionality that functions here as an invitation to viewer reorientation."

== Exhibitions ==
Incidence of Catastrophe was first exhibited at the Long Beach Museum of Art in 1988. The following year, it was included in a screening of Hill's videoworks at the Berkeley Art Museum and Pacific Film Archive (BAMPFA), the Whitney Biennial, and group shows at the National Gallery of Canada, Museum of Modern Art, and San Francisco Museum of Modern Art (SFMOMA), among others. It was also included in solo surveys of Hill's work at Moderna Museet (1990), Centre Georges Pompidou (1992–93, traveling to the Stedelijk Museum), Museum of Modern Art, Oxford (1993), Art Gallery of Ontario (1994), Museum of Contemporary Art, Los Angeles (1994), Dia Center for the Arts (1995), São Paulo Museum of Modern Art (1997), Musée d'art contemporain de Montréal (1998), Aarhus Kunstmuseum (1999), Centro Cultural Recoleta (2000), Kunstmuseum Wolfsburg (2001), SFMOMA (2005), and Suwon Art Museum (2019), among others. The work also appeared in the Venice Biennale (1997), in group exhibitions at BAMPFA, the Museum of Contemporary Art, Chicago, MoMA PS1 and the Whitney Museum, and in international film festivals.

== Collections and recognition ==
Incidence of Catastrophe is included in the public art collections of BAMPFA, the Centre Georges Pompidou, Kunstmuseum Wolfsburg, Musée d’art contemporain de Montréal, Museum of Contemporary Art Chicago, Museum of Modern Art, National Gallery of Australia, National Gallery of Canada, National Museum of Contemporary Art, Athens (EMST), SFMOMA, Seattle Art Museum, Smithsonian American Art Museum, Stedelijk Museum, and Zentrum für Kunst und Medientechnologie (ZKM), among others. In 1988 the video received first prize at the World Wide Video Festival in The Hague and at the Montréal Independent Film and Video Festival.
