= Sun Jiameng =

Chinese translator (1934–2013)

Sun Jiameng (Chinese: 孙家孟; 1934 – 4 April 2013) was a Chinese translator. He was born in Tianjin and graduated from the Department of Spanish, Beijing Foreign Languages Institute. He worked as professor of Spanish at the School of Foreign Studies, Nanjing University until his retirement. Between 1981 and 1982, he studied structural semantics in Peru.

He translated some novels written by Mario Vargas Llosa, such as The Green House (La casa verde), Captain Pantoja and the Special Service (Pantaleón y las visitadoras), Conversation in The Cathedral (Conversación en La Catedral), Who Killed Palomino Molero? (¿Quién mató a Palomino Molero?) and The Storyteller (El hablador). Other translations of his include the complete version of The Ingenious Gentleman Don Quixote of La Mancha (Don Quijote de la Mancha) and Hopscotch (Rayuela), by Julio Cortázar.

His research interests lay mainly in structural semantics and translation theories. He participated in compiling a textbook about Spanish – Chinese translation. Sun died in Nanjing on 4 April 2013.
