= Tall Ships (video installation) =

Video installation by artist Gary Hill

- Artist: Gary Hill
- Year: 1992
- Medium: Multi-channel video installation
- Dimensions: 10' h. x 10' w. x 90' l. (corridor)
- Location: Glenstone Museum Henry Art Gallery
- Website: Tall Ships, Gary Hill website

Gary Hill, Tall Ships, multi-channel video installation, 90' x 10' x 10', installation view, 1992.

Tall Ships (1992) is a multi-channel, silent video installation created by American new-media artist Gary Hill. The work was commissioned by curator Jan Hoet for Documenta 9 (1992), an edition of the international art exhibition held every five years in Kassel, Germany. It was selected for the Whitney Biennial in 1993 and has been exhibited at museums around the world.

The installation features a series of projected, soft-focus figures that seem to approach spectators as they move through an otherwise completely dark corridor. The behavior of visitors triggers the movements of the figures via a system of pressure-sensitive devices and computer software. Whitney Museum curator and critic Chrissie Iles describes the installation as effecting "an uncannily real exchange" in which "the unconscious reactions triggered by the apparently interactive figures make the viewers conscious of their own psychological mindset."

== Background ==
Hill is considered a pioneer in video and new-media art. He has used an array of technologies to explore visual and verbal language, the body, time and consciousness. Critics contend these interests are inspired less by works of art than by philosophical texts about awareness by Wittgenstein, Heidegger, Gregory Bateson and Maurice Blanchot. Hill came to video as a sculptor in 1973 and began integrating the medium into performance, sculptural and installation works. When he created Tall Ships, he was known for single-channel videos and time-based installations that used video as a metaphor for consciousness and an interface between visual and spoken thinking. These works introduced concrete elements—the body, the written word and three-dimensional form—into electronic space, establishing the medium as a tangibly physical experience.

Tall Ships extended these ideas but also departed from prior work in that it featured full figures rather than the fragmented body, took place in silence and without any text, and was absent visible monitors or means of production. Another notable aspect is the depth of the viewer's participation in the work. The installation's title was inspired by an old photograph Hill saw of a tall ship being moved out of a harbor in Seattle, where he lives. He related the graceful verticality and power of a ship cutting through the night with the figures he was taping for the work; a second association was the poetic notion of human relationships as "ships passing in the night."

== Description ==
Gary Hill, Tall Ships, multi-channel video installation, 90' x 10' x 10', detail, 1992.

Tall Ships consists of sixteen (sometimes twelve) ghostly, black-and-white videos of people projected from an oblique, overhead angle onto the walls of an almost entirely dark, ninety-foot corridor. Because of the projection method and its extreme angle, the figures have a high-contrast, somewhat blurred, wavering quality. Spaced at regular intervals of five feet and alternating side to side, the figures—standing or seated—initially appear in miniature (as if at a distance) and motionless with no screen or frame around them. They provide the sole illumination in the space.

The projections—family, friends and acquaintances of Hill's, of various age, ethnic origin and gender—each confront spectators in different ways, with gazes and gestures displaying a range of attitudes: impassiveness, fascination, puzzlement, longing, nervousness and impatience, among them. The last figure, a young girl centered at the end of the corridor (Hill's daughter), runs forward and opens her arms in a gesture that has been interpreted as openness or imploring.

The movements of the projections are triggered by the passage of spectators via electronic sensors under the carpet. As a visitor proceeds down the corridor, each figure in turn comes to life, turns, looks up and begins to walk forward, growing in size until it stands nearly face to face with the viewer. Each remains in place as long as the spectator does. If the viewer moves away, the figures turn and walk back, shrinking to their original, miniature blur; the girl lingers longer than the others after viewer move on. Because spectators may be alone or with others in the corridor, any or all of the figures may be activated—each independent of the others—depending on the number of people. Chris Darke of Frieze observed that this "element of regulated chance" made no two experiences of the work exactly the same.

== Critical commentary ==
Tall Ships stands as an early example of open-ended, responsive video art (as opposed to "interactive" works centered around fixed options). Visitors influence the installation's figures through their own behavior—unwittingly for the most part—and are, in turn, influenced by the projections both physically and psycho-emotionally. Art Monthly critic Andrew Wilson contended that Tall Ships succeeded at emotional affect where other video works fail by directing emphasis onto the body of the spectator rather than the work's subject. Whereas passive imagery places viewers in an observational role, the responsiveness and realism of the installation turn visitors into active participants. Chrissie Iles and others linked the work's participatory nature to Hill's identification of artistic process with the spontaneous verbal and non-verbal experience of encountering other people.

Commentators note various tensions in Tall Ships that serve to heighten participants' responses. The visual simplicity of the figures as well as the dark environment focus attention on the figures' movements and presence; several critics also point to the role of silence in creating a "sensation of simultaneous distance and intimacy." Registering more as quasi-animate beings eliciting empathy than as images, the projections have been variously described as "searching and meditative," "ethereal," "haunting," and "spectral." Parkett's Gary Michael Dault characterized the figures' passage as one of "perpetual possibility" to "proffered availability" and back. Art historian Julie Harboe noted how a viewer's drawing of inferences based on the appearance and body language of the projections simultaneously evoke the immediacy and inaccessibility of individuality. The realistic—but ultimately impossible—interactions lend themselves to a sense of poignancy that does not resolve, a state that critics liken to being infinitely "on the verge" of communication.

According to writers George Quasha and Charles Stein, the personal reactions that participants have in response to the figures contrast with their knowledge that the interactions are impersonal, an effect which encourages a self-conscious examination of their own reactions and subconscious processes. In their analysis, this foregrounding of psychological projections in response to literal projections is a focal point of Tall Ships: "There remains the space in which the mind knows itself as inherently free of both orders of projection, the patterned emotions that arise and the phenomena that provoke us. … [This] is the space in which you could say that both our personal experience and the 'objective content' of the work, as projected images, belong to the unconscious of the work as a whole, which is moving toward a consciousness larger than either."

== Technical aspects ==
Tall Ships uses custom hardware and controlling software originally designed by Hill and engineer Dave Jones. For each projection, Hill used modified 4-inch black-and-white CRT video monitors with commonly available projection lenses placed on top of them. Pressure-sensitive switch-runners under the carpet detect spectator movement, triggering the movements of the projections. The images were housed together on laserdiscs, with each individually linked to a single computer along with the switch-runners.

In 2023, a conservation project was undertaken by the Glenstone Museum, Hill and Small Data Industries of Rochester, New York to migrate the artwork to newer technologies for future preservation and exhibition. The handmade, custom projectors were retained in order to maintain the work's highly unique image quality, while some of the behind-the-scenes components (the original PC, laserdisc players, and custom software) were replaced. The project was completed in 2024.

== Exhibitions and collections ==
In addition to its appearances at Documenta IX and the Whitney Museum, Tall Ships was exhibited at the Aarhus Kunstmuseum (Denmark), Centro Cultural Banco do Brasil, Henry Art Gallery, Moderna Museet (Stockholm), Musée d'art contemporain de Lyon (France), Museum of Contemporary Art Taipei, Museum of Modern Art, Oxford, São Paulo Museum of Modern Art, Stedelijk Museum Amsterdam, and Tate Liverpool, among other venues. It was included in the surveys "Space Odysseys: Sensation and Immersion" (Art Gallery of New South Wales, 2001) and "Being & Time: The Emergence of Video Projection" (1996–8), a travelling exhibition organized by the Albright-Knox Art Gallery.

Tall Ships belongs to the public art collections of the Glenstone Museum and Henry Art Gallery.
