= Myriam Thyes =

Swiss digital artist (born 1963)

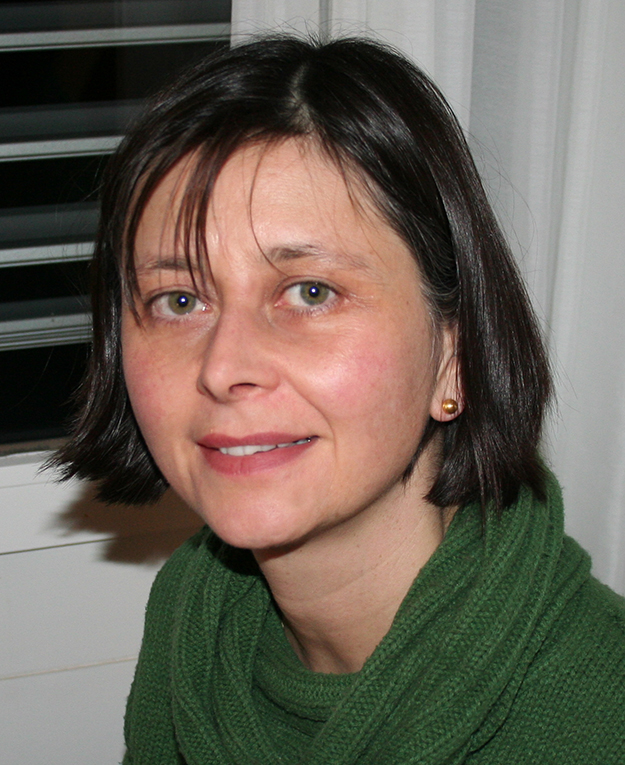
- portrait of Myriam Thyes, 2007
- Born: 1963 (age 62–63); Luxembourg
- Education: Nan Hoover
- Known for: new media
- Notable work: 'Flag Metamorphoses'
- Website: www.thyes.com

Myriam Thyes (born 1963 in Luxembourg) is a new media artist from Switzerland. She lives and works in Düsseldorf.

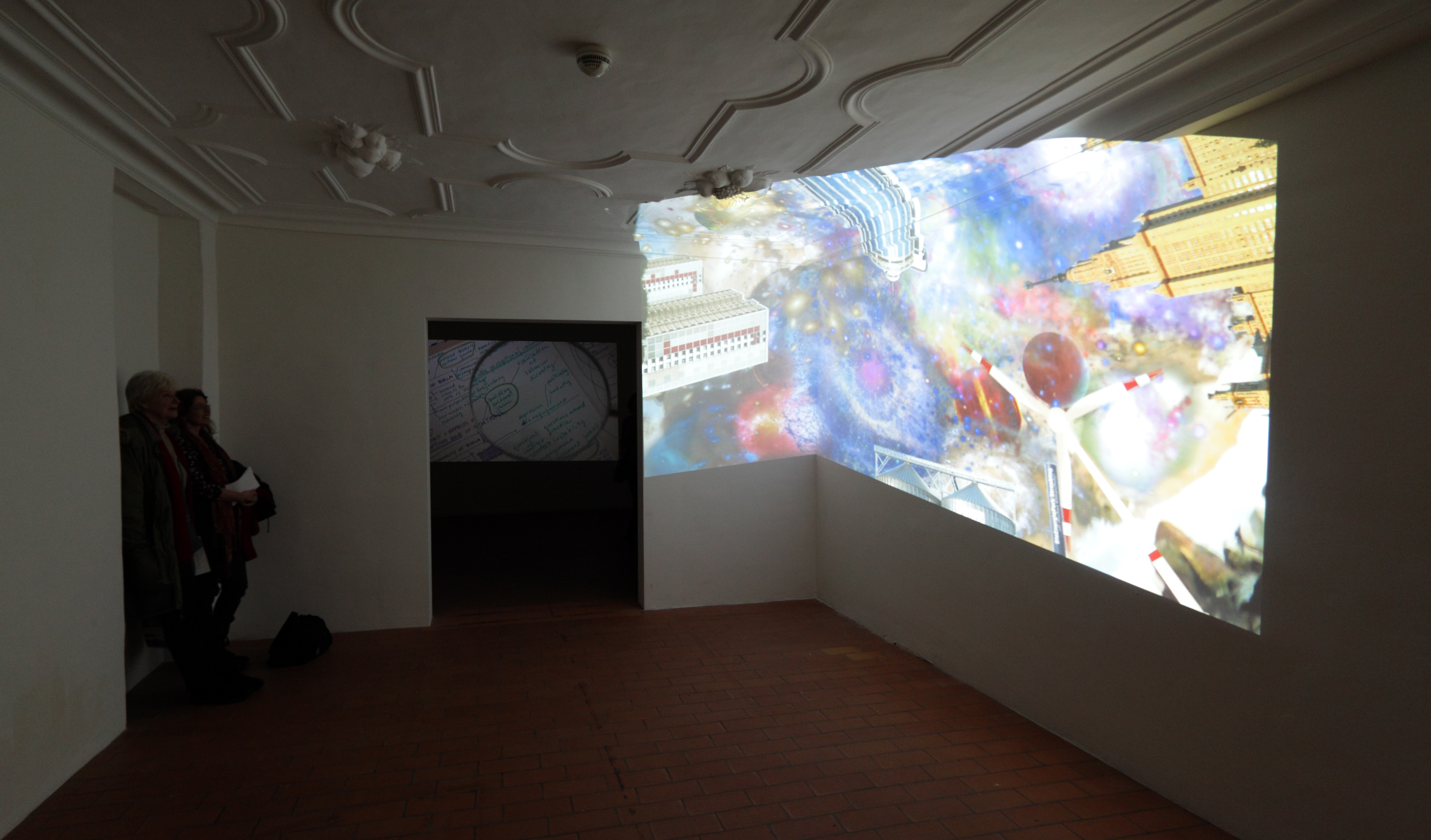
RaumWelten, Museum Baerengasse, Zürich, 2013

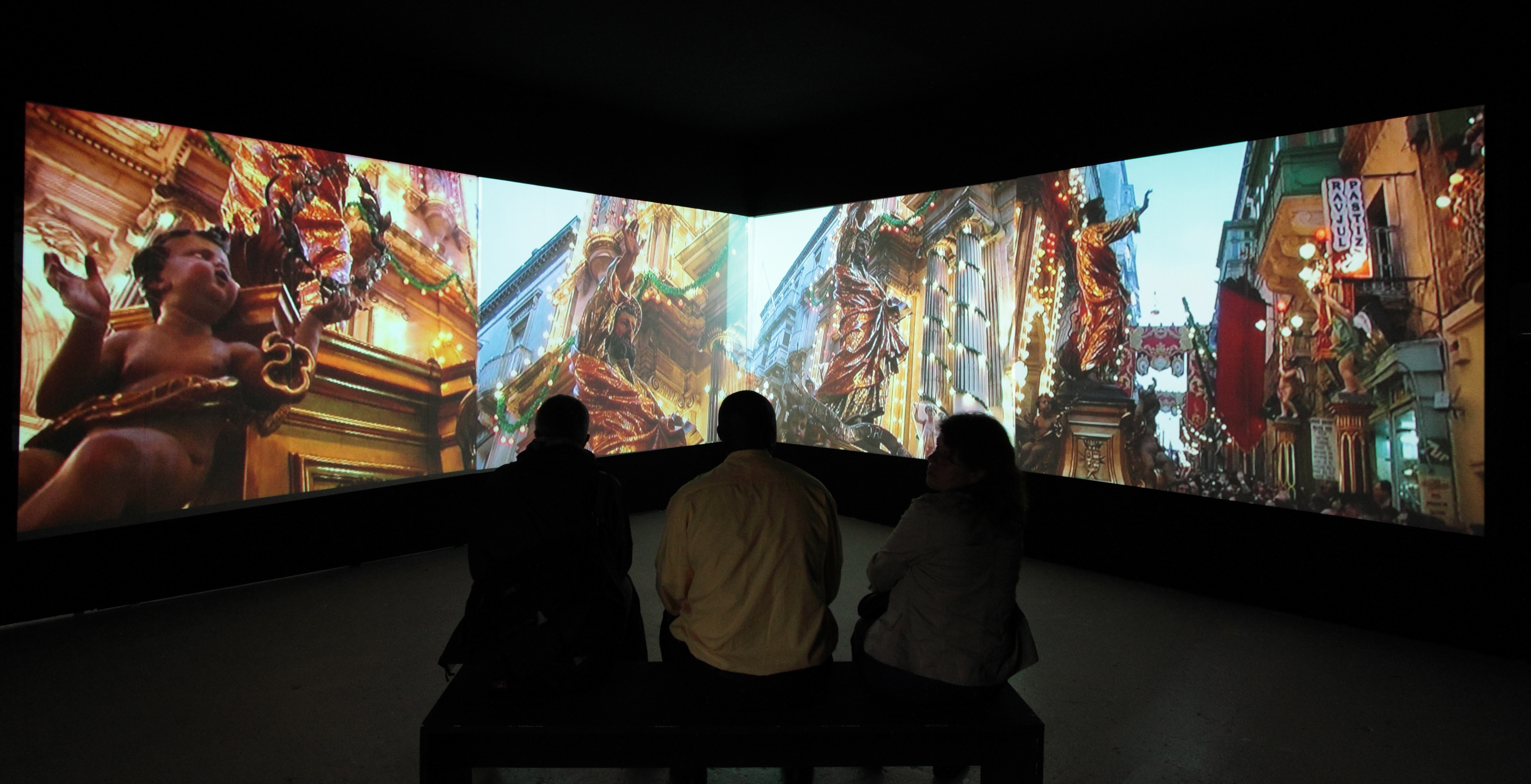
Malta As Metaphor, Shedhalle Zürich, 2011

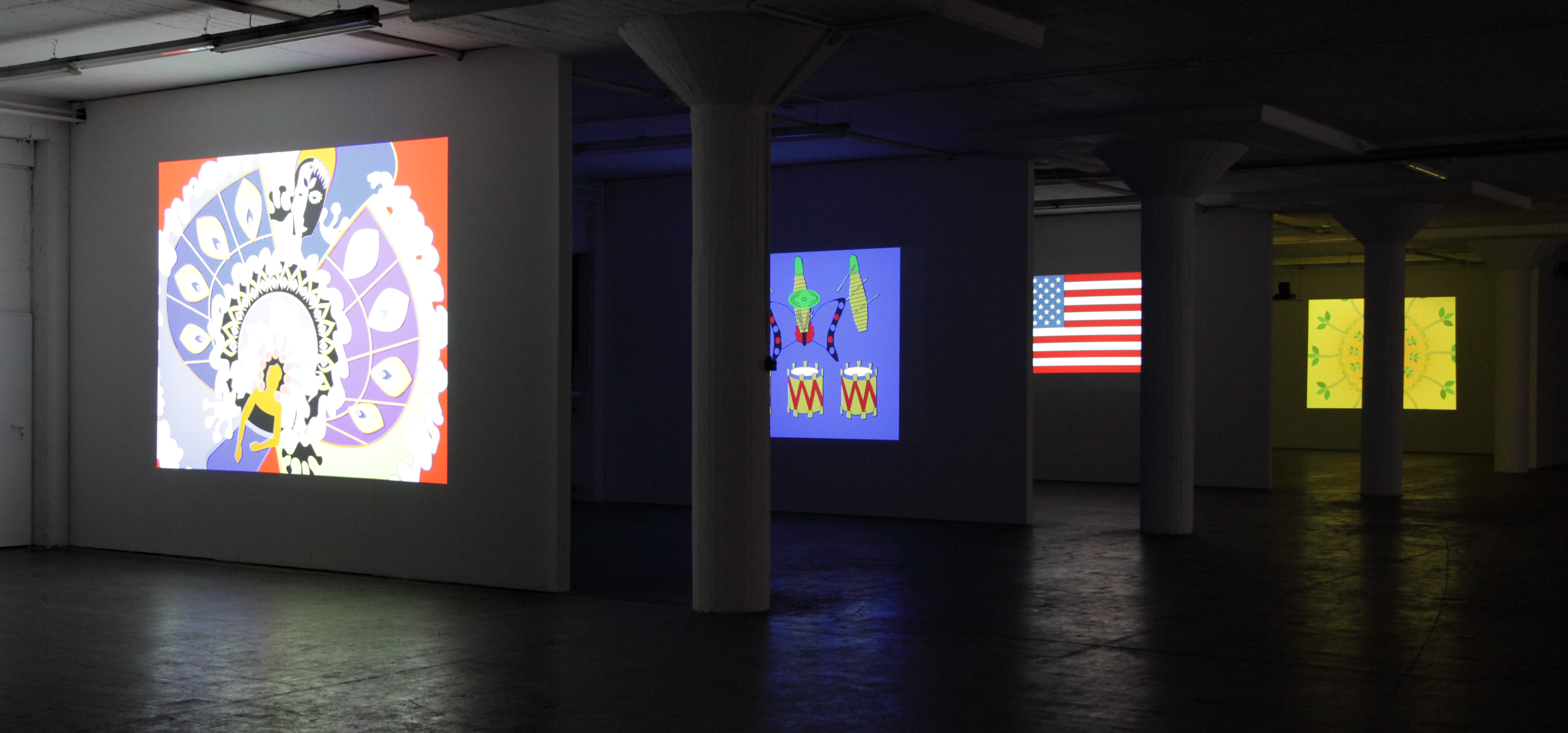
Flag Metamorphoses, Halle Zehn, CAP Cologne, Cologne, 2010

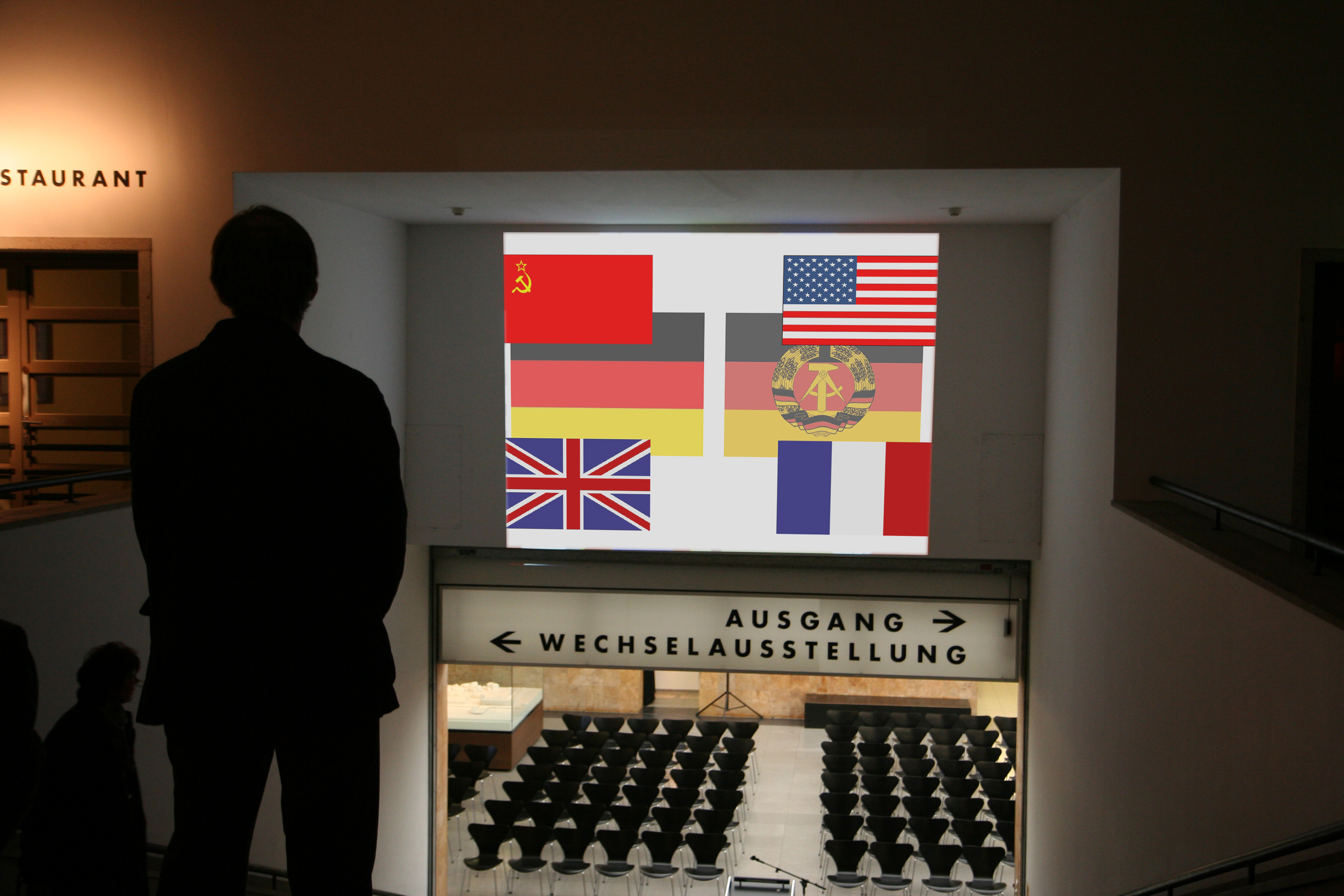
Flag Metamorphoses, Zeppelin Museum Friedrichshafen, 2008

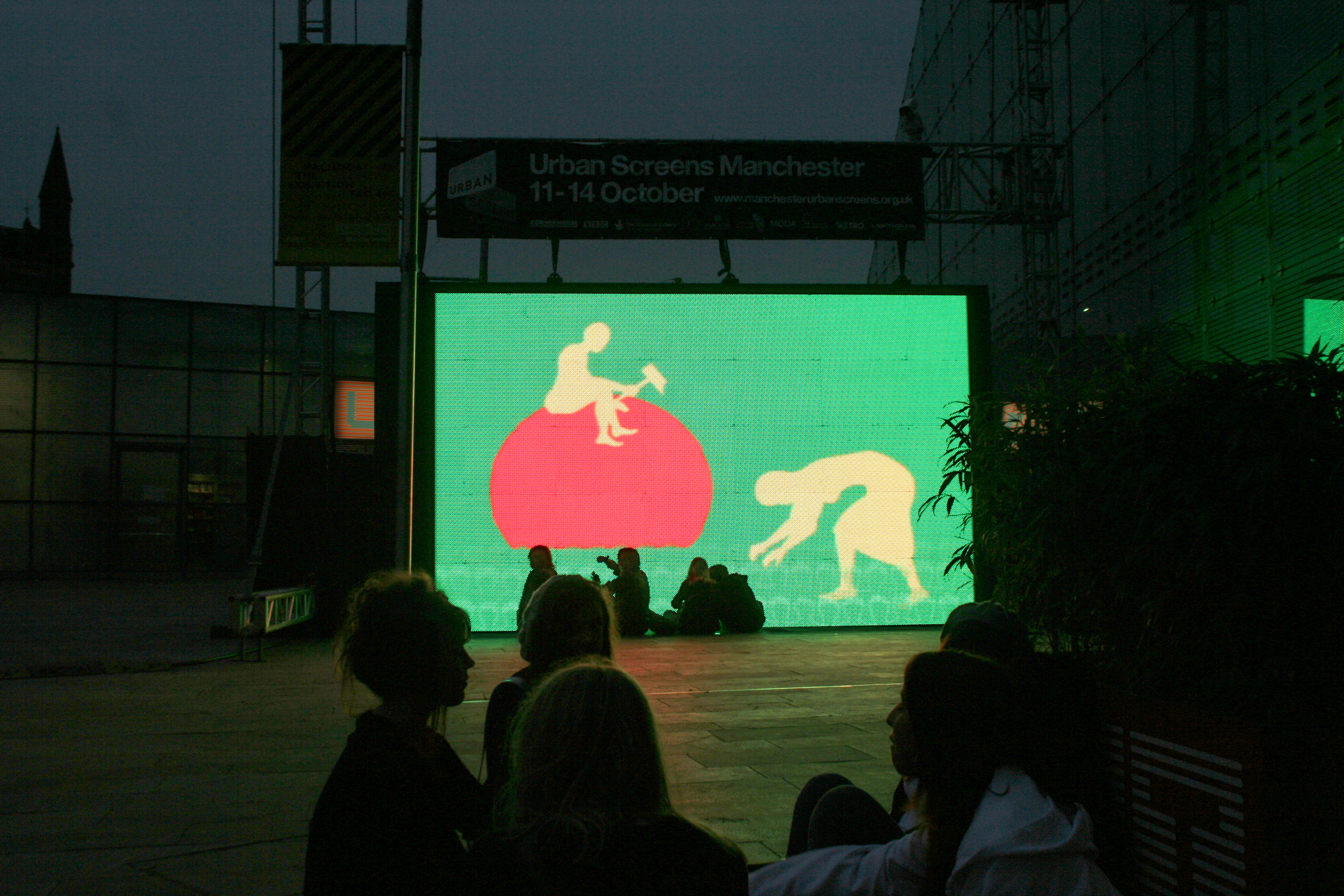
Flag Metamorphoses, Urban Screens Manchester, 2007

== Biography ==
Myriam Thyes was born in Luxembourg and grew up in Zürich. After getting certificate of higher education entrance, she studied at Hoehere Schule für Gestaltung Zurich, now ZHdK Zurich University of the Arts, Switzerland. 1986 to 1992, the artist studied at the Academy of Fine Arts Düsseldorf, Kunstakademie Düsseldorf, painting with Professor Rissa, and video art with Professor Nan Hoover. She received a degree 'Meisterschueler' from Kunstakademie Düsseldorf. Since 1994, Thyes participates in exhibitions and festivals internationally.

Since 1999, main artistic media of Myriam Thyes are video art, 2D computer animation, photography, and digital imagery. From beginning of 2000 she initiates and realizes as well participatory projects and media art projects in public space. She co-founded artist group Strictly Public who were invited to participate at Berlin media art festival transmediale.04. Already in 2000 and 2001, Strictly Public showed video art at 9 metro stations in North Rhine-Westphalia (Germany), and 2002 in 26 main stations of the federal railroad all over Germany. Among Thyes's video art works in these programs was 'A little Meditation', the animation of the yin yang symbol, shown for example on the big screen at Frankfurt/Main central station.

LA Freewaves: Video art could be seen on monitors in stores and on billboards on Sunset Boulevard at the then new media festival 2004 in Los Angeles under artistic director Anne Bray. Cathrien Schreuder: "Myriam Thyes's work A Little Meditation on Sunset Boulevard in Hollywood is a good example. In order to maintain its own form, her animated yin-yang symbol 'fights against the influences of commerce, and in doing so wrests a place for itself in the streetscape. Employing a universal idiom, Thyes visualizes the imbalance within the force field of oublic space. (...) The fact that the work is a good supplement to the streetscape on which it has been shown, including the screens in the train stations of Düsseldorf, the Victory Park Screens in Dallas and various screens in Bern, Bosnia, Melbourne, Manchester and Dublin."

Thyes' themes deal with symbols, myths and visual signs from architecture, politics, movies, and religions, but as well mythical characters from Hollywood movies, and female characters form different cultures and epochs.

Thyes is represented by the media art foundation 'Imai – inter media art institute' (Germany) and videokunst.ch (Switzerland). She is member of Deutscher Künstlerbund (visual artists association, Germany) and Visarte (visual artists association, Switzerland).

== Works ==
One of her best known works – frequently shown in exhibitions and festivals internationally – is the participatory animation project Flag Metamorphoses. She started in 2005 a continuously growing series of Flash animations concerning flags, other national symbols, and relations between countries. It's a work about relations between nations and identities: each artist who creates a flag animation expresses such a relation in his or her own way. So far, the series contains 40 animations by 30 international artists and teams. All animations together include about 100 different nations. Professor Paul Wells about Flag Metamorphoses in his book Re-Imagining Animation: "Thyes's work is a very particular response to what she describes a very human 'double wish' to have both an individual identity and yet belong to a bigger group, often represented through nations, which are themselves 'imagined communities'. On her choice of flags as iconic Stimuli, Thyes recognises that their symbolism often endures beyond the actual conditions a nation lives through, sometimes remaining largely aspirational (...) Working in such a direct and politicised way, Thyes saw the opportunity to embrace both a democratic approach to the creation of work responsive to a core theme while engaging with other artists, but also in relation to its dissemination to a global audience on the World Wide Web. (...) Inevitably, this level of engagement prompts differing approaches and levels of interrogation. The political level looks at relationships between neighbouring countries, colonial ties and cultural imperialism. On the other hand, the artistic level examines the collapse and revision of largely geometric forms into more amorphous, organic and fluid configurations. (...) Thyes recognised that the key concept of changing cultures was readily revealed through the use of animation's core language of metamorphosis, and in the way animation could reveal and yet challenge the dense meanings embedded in national image systems. (...) Conceptually, Thyes felt that the best results might be achieved if the metamorphoses themselves took place within a single frame: 'What I have in mind is generally one changing image, not a film with scenes and cuts.' (...) This use of the formalist limits of the frame, while addressing the conditions of transition and meaning within it, reflects Thyes's background and identity as a visual artist. The particular influence of Russian Constructivism and the work of the Bauhaus movement are reflected in her collage technique and political satire." In the 1990s, she had worked with real flags as installations in public areas: She created and painted new designs and symbols on flags and hung them beside and between official flags in Düsseldorf and Luxembourg.

Thyes participated in the Art Colony Galichnik in Macedonia in Summer 2010. Artists and curators from various Balkan countries worked together. Thyes asked her subjects to answer in their mother tongues (Serbian/Croatian/Bosnian, Macedonian, Bulgarian and Albanian) and then subtitled their replies into English. She created a collage of images and voices in a two-channel video installation, called From Art Colony Galichnik with love (Macedonia 2010). "Thyes documents the thoughts of her subjects and combines their words with shots of the countryside. She creates a sensitive picture of the different personalities and characters, partly by matching the two sets of images. The shots of landscapes and towns depict the origins of the person speaking or emphasise the content of what is being said. Thyes, who has Swiss and Luxembourgian roots, puts the individual at the heart of her work. In doing so, she teils a story of the human needs that exist together at a specific point and place in time - and that, ultimately, reflect the needs that people experience at any time and anywhere in the world."

The series of photos and photomontages Glasgow Styles reflect the artist's impressions of the post-industrial city of Glasgow and her inhabitants. Thyes has drawn a social portrait and created a kind of contemporary "Historienbilder" (historical paintings). Michael Staab in The Whole Picture. Second Take about this work: "... Now, in her series entitled Glasgow Styles, Myriam Thyes takes the consistent next step, and combines the realistic, serial and documentary potential of photography with the formative, allegorising and metaphor-creating traditions of the fine arts. She compiles individual snapshots into sequences that make lapses of time and changes of perspective visible, and also mounts photographs taken at geographically differing locations and at staggered points in time into altogether new pictorial inventions. The citizens of Glasgow, some of them mounted into the original pictures, happened to be at other locations in the same town at the time the pictures were taken. Thus the right people are in the pictures, only, as stated above, at a different place and at another time. The divergence thus highlighted between space, time and individual remains tangible in Thyes’s works, and conveys to the viewer a profound sense of the mood of the people in this city. ..."

Malcolm Dickson, director of Street Level Photoworks in Glasgow, in his text Glasgow Styles: "Myriam Thyes's series Glasgow Styles delineates how Glasgow as a contemporary city reflects its past through the present. Initially what seems like a random visual derive is coherently held together through a detailed narrative that the artist has perceptively encountered and which helps to inform Thyes' personal topography of our city. This topography is the city's changing face – a place historically and contemporaneously of contrasts and tensions."

== Major exhibitions and festivals ==
(C = catalog)

- 1994 Treibhaus 6, Museum Kunstpalast, Düsseldorf. C
- 1997 as large as life, <rotor> Kunstverein, steirischer herbst, Graz, Austria.
- 2002 International Shortfilm Festival, Hamburg.
- 2004 Transmediale, Media Art Festival, Berlin.
- 2004 11th Marl Video art Prize, Skulpturenmuseum Glaskasten, Marl. C
- 2005 European Media Art Festival EMAF, Osnabrueck.
- 2005 KunstFilmBiennale, Koelnischer Kunstverein, Cologne. C
- 2005 Encounters Short Film and Animation Festival, Bristol, UK. (Depict!Award for the video ASCENSION)
- FILE Festivals, Brazil (São Paulo 2005, Rio de Janeiro 2006, Porto Alegre 2008, São Paulo 2010). C
- 2006 Highlights of KunstFilmBiennale, Kunstwerke KW, Berlin.
- 2007 Big Screens by Victory Media Network, Victory Plaza, Victory Park, Dallas (TX), USA. (Flag Metamorphoses)
- 2007 Timeloop – Video art from Germany, Street Level Photoworks, Glasgow, UK.
- 2007 WRO 07 International Media Art Biennale, Wroclaw, Poland.
- 2007 Perpetual Art Machine - Video Art in the Age of the Internet. Chelsea Art Museum, New York City.
- 2007 Urban Screens, conference (Cornerhouse) and art events in public space (BBC Big Screen), Manchester, UK. (Flag Metamorphoses)
- 2007 VideoFormes, Clermont-Ferrand, France.
- 2008 Nothing to declare. Triennale of Contemporary Art Oberschwaben, Zeppelin Museum, Friedrichshafen, Germany. C
- 2009 Speeded Up Flags and Slowed Down Heroes, solo exhibition, Kunstverein Rhein-Sieg, Siegburg, Germany.
- 2010 Flag Metamorphoses, Halle Zehn, CAP Cologne, Koeln, Germany.
- 2011 Songs of the Swamp, Kunsthalle Exnergasse, Vienna, Austria.
- 2011 Connect – Art Between Media and Reality, Shedhalle, Zurich, Switzerland. C.
- 2011 ISEA 2011 Istanbul, Turkey.
- 2012 Glasgow Styles / Magnify Malta, solo exhibition, Kunstverein Duisburg, Germany. C.
- 2012 Enigma della modernità, Spazio Officina, Chiasso, Switzerland. C
- 2012 Images Against Darkness, video art from Imai – inter media art institute. KIT Kunst im Tunnel, Düsseldorf. C.
- 2012 Video Vortex 8, Museum of Contemporary Art, Zagreb, Croatia.
- 2012 OSTRALE'012 - Homegrown, Dresden. C
- 2013 RaumWelten, Museum Baerengasse, Zurich, Switzerland.
- 2013 OSTRALE'013 – we cross the Rubicon, Dresden. C
- 2013 SHARE PRIZE – Real Time / Real Space, media art exhibition of Piemonte Share Festival, Accademia di Belle Arti Albertina, Turin, Italy.
- 2014 RAPPORT (with Patricia Lambertus), Kunstverein Schwerin, Germany.
- 2015 Dec. - 2016 June: TILL IT'S GONE, Istanbul Modern / Istanbul Museum of Modern Art, Turkey. Included in Art Speaks Out, video art program by ikono TV.
- 2016 100 Years of World Transition, Schaumbad - Freies Atelierhaus, Graz, Austria.
- 2017 The Secret Life of Things, Museum Villa Rot, Burgrieden-Rot, Germany.
- 2017 Courant 3D Festival, Angoulême, France.
- 2018 The Gesture, Ludwig Galerie Schloss Oberhausen, Germany. C
- 2019 Myriam Thyes - Baroque Promises and Constructive Doubts, Kunstmuseum Ahlen (in Westfalia), Germany.
- 2019 B.A.R.O.C.K. Artistic Interventions in Caputh Palace and Wunderkammer Olbricht, me Collectors Room, Berlin.

== Works in public collections ==
- Museum Kunstpalast, Düsseldorf, Germany
- Luxembourg City History Museum, Luxembourg
- Art Collection of the Federal Republic of Germany, Düsseldorf
- Deutscher Künstlerbund (Association of German Artists), Berlin
- Imai Foundation, Dusseldorf, Germany.
- Art Collection of the Canton of Zurich, Switzerland
- Olbricht Collection, Essen / Berlin, Germany.
- Kunstmuseum Ahlen, Germany.

== Selected bibliography ==
- B.A.R.O.C.K. Artistic Interventions at Caputh Palace. Publisher: Directorate General of the Prussian Palaces and Gardens Foundation Berlin-Brandenburg. Languages: EN, DE. Published by: Edition Cantz, Esslingen 2019. ISBN 978-3-947563-31-9
- DIE GESTE (The Gesture), exhibition catalog, Ludwiggalerie Schloss Oberhausen. Publisher: Christine Vogt. Language: DE. Published by: Kerber, Bielefeld/Berlin 2018. ISBN 978-3-7356-0506-1
- Thinking Through Digital Media. Transnational Environments and Locative Places. By Dale Hudson + Patricia R. Zimmermann, Palgrave Macmillan, New York 2015. ISBN 978-1-137-43361-9 (hardcover), ISBN 978-1-137-43362-6 (paperback).
- Ostrale'13 – We Cross the Rubicon, exhibition catalogue, Dresden, 2013.
- Images Against Darkness. Video art from the archive of imai – inter media art institute, KIT Kunst im Tunnel, Düsseldorf, 2012.
- Myriam Thyes – Glasgow Styles / Magnify Malta, by Kunstverein Duisburg, Kehrer Artbooks, Heidelberg, 2012, ISBN 978-3-86828-276-4
- Connect – Art Between Media and Reality, Swiss Federal Office of Culture + Shedhalle Zurich, Verlag fuer Moderne Kunst, Nuremberg, 2011, ISBN 978-3-86984-246-2
- Pixels and Places – Video Art in Public Space, by Catrien Schreuder, NAi Publishers, Rotterdam, 2010, ISBN 978-90-5662-738-6.
- Re-Imagining Animation, by Paul Wells + Johnny Hardstaff (UK), AVA Academia publishing, Lausanne, Thames & Hudson, 2008, ISBN 978-2-940373-69-7.
- Nothing to declare. 4th Triennial of Contemporary Art Oberschwaben, exhibition catalog, Verlag für moderne Kunst Nuremberg, 2008.
- Myriam Thyes – UmBildungen/ReVisions, monograph, by Imai – inter media art institute, Kehrer Artbooks, Heidelberg, 2007, ISBN 978-3-939583-46-2
- German Video Art 2002–2004, Marl Media Art Prizes, Skulpturenmuseum Glaskasten, Marl, 2004, ISBN 3-924790-69-8
- Treibhaus 6, Museum Kunstpalast, Düsseldorf, 1994.
