= Gary Hill =

American artist

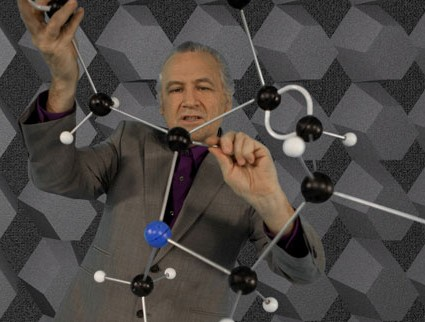
- Gary Hill, The Psychedelic Gedankenexperiment, 2011
- Born: 1951 (age 74–75); Santa Monica, California, US
- Known for: New media, video, sculpture installation, performance
- Notable work: Why Do Things Get in a Muddle? (1984), Incidence of Catastrophe (1987-88), Inasmuch as It Is Always Already Taking Place (1990),Tall Ships (1992), Viewer (1996), Frustrum (2006)
- Awards: MacArthur, Guggenheim, Rockefeller, Leone d'Oro
- Website: Gary Hill

Gary Hill, Inasmuch as It Is Always Already Taking Place, Sixteen-channel audio/video installation; dimensions of horizontal niche: 16" h. x 54" x 66", 1990. Installation view, Museum of Modern Art, New York.

Gary Hill (1951) is an American artist whose work has centered on video, installation art, sculpture and performance. Based on works extending over fifty years from the late 1960s onward, he is considered a foundational figure in the areas of single- and multi-channel video and new-media art. Although his work has connections to conceptual art and minimalism, Hill is known for an independent approach that is inspired more by philosophical and literary texts than by central concerns of art and film such as representation, narrative and description. He has used an array of nascent technologies—computer software, projection, virtual reality, CGI—to examine consciousness and its relationship to the body, perception, time, and visual and verbal language. Los Angeles Times critic David Pagel commented, "Hill creatively uses high-tech instruments to elicit personal experiences of archetypal simplicity. With his work, the invisible operations of thinking take tangible shape. Perception and cognition circle around one another, engaging their subjects."

Hill's work belongs to the public collections of the Centre Pompidou, Los Angeles County Museum of Art, Museum of Modern Art, Stedelijk Museum Amsterdam, Tate Gallery, and Whitney Museum, among others. He has exhibited at those and other international museums and been featured multiple times in events such as Documenta, the Venice Biennale and Whitney Biennial. He has been recognized with awards including the MacArthur Fellowship, Guggenheim Fellowship, Rockefeller Fellowship and Rome Prize. Hill lives and works in Seattle, Washington and Mallorca, Spain.

== Early life and career ==
Hill was born in Santa Monica, California in 1951 and grew up in Redondo Beach, where he was an avid surfer and skateboarder. He began making welded sculpture at the age of 16, inspired by the artist Robert Anthony Park, before moving to Woodstock, New York in 1969. There, he studied at the Art Students League and independently with the painter Bruce Dorfman, and later became involved with Woodstock Community Video, a grass-roots television organization.

In the 1970s, Hill integrated experiments with electronic sound, video, synthesizers and performance into his welded and mixed-media constructions. Emerging amid the conceptual and performative context of that era, he worked on parallel tracks, producing single-channel videotapes that involved electronic image processing, distortion and language, as well as sculptural installations that used video and the body as elements. For the installation Hole in the Wall (1974) he filmed himself cutting a television monitor-sized hole layer by layer through a wall at the Woodstock Artists Association. He then placed a monitor in the new orifice that played a loop of his recorded action, enacting video's occupation of exhibition spaces previously devoted to painting and sculpture.

In the mid- and latter-1970s, Hill ran the Artists' TV Lab in Woodstock and was an artist-in-residence and instructor at the Experimental Television Center and a visiting professor in media studies at State University at Buffalo. In 1985, after participating in the US/Japan Fellowship Exchange program, he accepted an offer to establish the media-arts program at Cornish School of the Arts in Seattle.

== Main themes ==
Hill is considered a seminal artist in video and new media art. His work is known for its exploratory use of emergent technologies and for its post-structuralist focus on the nature of perception, language and consciousness. Many of his works employ visual and verbal syntax in ways that call attention to the unseen processes involved in human cognition. Art historian Lynne Cooke wrote: "A pioneer in his embrace of the then novel medium of video, Hill distinguished himself through a radical approach that both literally and conceptually deconstructed it."

Hill's unconventional approach is seen as being grounded in literary and philosophical influences more than in art historical ones. Whereas artwork typically draws influence from the art canon, Hill's work is informed by writers concerned with consciousness and communication, such as Maurice Blanchot, Gregory Bateson, Wittgenstein, Heidegger, Jacques Derrida, and Marshall McLuhan. Critics note a resulting iconoclastic quality in his work, which privileges signification over representation, counteracts the illusion and smooth functioning of image sequences, and rejects cinematic and documentary conventions. Artforum critic Susan Kandel observed, "Hill's work is seductive in part because it is nothing like most video art. … [he] strips away the hardware, imperils the idioms with an idiosyncratic form of discourse, and interrupts the flow with strange moments of epiphany."

A key aspect of Hill's art is its intent and propensity to stimulate conscious reflection, particularly regarding the subconscious linguistic, visual and social processes involved in daily life. Through means including ambiguity, juxtaposition, distortion and fragmentation, the work operates on a meta level to illuminate such processes and encourage viewers to examine them. Many of the works are self-reflexive or designed to elicit self-consciousness in the audience. According to critics, Hill's techniques create a liminal conceptual space whereby philosophical questions are posed but not answered, an approach which invites active participation—a hallmark of his art.

Embodiment is a recurring theme in Hill's work, which enacts the exteriorization of internal processes and explores ways in which physical form may limit and shape experience. He sometimes situates technology as an analogue to human embodiment or, conversely, makes novel use of technology to display bodies in ways that challenge prevailing convention. For example, certain works mirror processes of the brain and body through the movement of signals between machines and screens, while others evoke the body using viscera-like arrangements of unhoused video tubes and cables.

Language is also central to Hill's oeuvre—specifically, how it functions, disrupts and fails in human thought and interaction. Similar to his treatment of embodiment, Hill probes language as a mediator of experience and makes unexpected use of syntax to illuminate the role of linguistic structures in thought and interaction. As he does with images, the artist often rejects the logic of a received grammar of meaning, opting for "a language of evocation" to convey the richness of reality, rather than one of description or explanation.

== Individual works ==
=== Single-channel video ===
In the late-1970s, Hill explored the structure of meaning in a series of single-channel videos. These works used interplay between image, language, sound and electronic phenomena involving formal, rhythmic and textural patterns of enunciation and visual transformation (e.g., Electronic Linguistics, 1977). Soundings (1979) fused language, sculptural, performance and sound, depicting in abstract close-up a speaker tweeter being submerged, buried, pierced and burned accompanied a Hill monologue describing the actions, his voice seemingly impacted by each one. In Happenstance (part one of many parts) (1982–83), he evoked thought through an ephemeral choreography of morphing black-and-white imagery, words and letters whose basic formal repertoire linked the triangle, square and circle to specific sounds.

Gary Hill, Incidence of Catastrophe, single-channel video, still image, color, sound; 43:51 min, 1987–88.

In other videos, speech served as an active force exerted on the image, causing visuals to appear and disappear, pan or fragment—a reversal of the typical sound-image relationship. Around & About (1980) consists of images of interiors and objects appearing in succession to the single-syllabic rhythm of Hill narrating stream-of-consciousness disclosures about human relations. He employed a similar method in Primarily Speaking (1981–83). It features a right-left, split picture plane, each with a rectangle containing video sequences that contrasted with or mirrored one another, set against a graphic background that alternated between basic color screens and idiomatic wipe patterns used in television. The narration—emitted in dialogue manner from the left and right stereo channels—makes punning use of figures of speech and idiomatic expressions while evoking a vague communal crisis.

In two later works, Hill returned to narrated text as a structuring device for imagery, albeit in different ways. The video installation Wall Piece (2000) projected heavily strobed, singular moments of Hill throwing himself repeatedly against a wall into a darkened space, itself outfitted with strobing light. With each impact, he spoke a single word, which when strung together, formed an existential monologue describing a corporeal and emotional impasse. The video Site Recite (a prologue) (1989) was a meditation on death in which Hill linked the rhythm of the spoken word to the action of a camera using a shallow depth of focus. The camera traverses a vanitas-like arrangement of objects: bird and small mammal skulls, butterflies, bones, nuts, bark. Objects emerge in sharp focus, one at a time against a nebulous background and return to blurs, calling attention to their transient beauty, as well as to the cycle of life and the irretrievability of the present moment.

In several videos, Hill linked related themes of entropy, disorder and catastrophe to the immateriality of electronic media. Why Do Things Get in a Muddle? (Come on Petunia) (1984) was one of several works that examined the incommensurability of language and thought through constructed debates and dramas. It portrays a dialogue between Alice in Wonderland and her father regarding words, the order of things, and the direction of time. Featuring references to the Lewis Carroll books in its props, references and structuring, the video also incorporated Bateson's idea of the metalogue—a dialogue whose form illustrates the philosophical problem being discussed. It included inverted imagery and characters reciting their lines backwards; the recording was then played backwards resulting in strangely slurred, partially incomprehensible but properly ordered words.

Incidence of Catastrophe (1987–88) was inspired by the Blanchot novel, Thomas the Obscure (1941), and dramatized the power of language. Hill embodied the novel's protagonist—a man reading a novel in which he is the subject—thus compounding the self-reflexivity of the book. The video includes imagery of the sea flooding the book's pages and a shoreline, text as an impenetrable forest or nausea-inducing phenomena, and a dinner in which conversation becomes incomprehensible. It ends with a collapse of the self that leaves the character naked and curled in a fetal position on the floor of a bathroom as disembodied words tower above him. Writers have linked Wall Piece and Hill's later video-sound installation, Place Holder (2019), to Incidence; all feature Hill as the central figure, elements of repetition and entropy, and variously, physical toil and impasse.

=== Multi-channel installations ===
In multi-channel video installations beginning in 1980, Hill sought to externalize the inner world of consciousness, experience and feeling using a fusion of objects, images, written text and spoken word. In War Zone (1980) and Glass Onion (1981), Hill played language and image off of one another. The former work combined sixteen objects, speakers whispering the names of the objects and a prerecorded video of the space that together created a kind of battle between left and right brain and perceptual and conceptual faculties. Glass Onion layered four concentric rectangles of speakers and monitors that formed a feedback loop involving an overhead camera, audio text, visitor movement and a shifting perspective.

In later works, Hill presented images flowing across exposed video tubes that were strung together like words in a sentence, pages of a book, or fleeting thoughts. Disturbance (among the jars) (Centre Georges Pompidou, 1988) was a multi-lingual adaptation of Gnostic texts whose structuring theme of fragmentation reflected the physical reality of the original texts. It featured seven video tubes positioned in a broken line, grouped or alone, on a low platform in a brightly lit white room. The screens juxtaposed images of landscapes, encrusted texts and performers—poets, Jacques Derrida, actors and passersby reciting reworked gnostic passages—that seem to crawl through the space as discrete units or together as a whole. Critic Chrissie Iles related the work's non-linear fracture of language norms to the original texts' challenge to Christian gospels.

Other installations used multiple images and components to evoke bodily experience. Inasmuch as It Is Always Already Taking Place (1990, MoMA) offered a composite self-portrait displayed across a jumble of 16 exposed tubes ranging from normal- to fingernail-size, set in a deep, horizontal, crypt-like niche in the wall. They displayed nearly still, fragmented close-ups of parts of the artist's nude body while he appears—per the audio—to read and turn the pages of a book. Reviewers characterized the work as an elemental, "viscerally powerful" speculation on the "uneasy interrelationships of technology, art and life." With Suspension of Disbelief (for Marine) (1991–92), Hill created a site of sexual fusion taking place across thirty black-and-white screens suspended edge-to-edge along the length of a beam, their horizontal linearity encouraging a left-to-right narrative reading. They display tight, quick-cut scans of two nude, reclining bodies—a male and female—that entangle, separate and melt into one another in an erotically charged rhythm.

Gary Hill, Viewer, Five-channel video installation, color, silent; total projection length approx. 540", 1996.

Related in theme and method to those two works is the video-sound installation, Up Against Down (2008), a six-screen projection of different parts of Hill's body forcibly pressing against an ambiguous black space. The changing pressure of his actions modulated sound at low frequencies that penetrated a viewer's body with audible and subsonic waves.

=== Projected video installations ===
With projected video installations beginning with Beacon (Two Versions of the Imaginary) (1990)—which cast two different images from the ends of a slowly oscillating tube—Hill freed his video work and audiences from the constraint of the monitor. These installations foregrounded the act of viewing and participation by spectators who physically became part of the work.

Tall Ships (1992) and Viewer (1996), addressed the non-verbal experience of encountering people, using projection, silence and full rather than fragmented bodies. Tall Ships (Documenta 9) consists of sixteen ghostly, black-and-white figures cast in soft-focus from an oblique, overhead angle that seem to approach spectators as they move through an otherwise completely dark, 90-foot corridor. Visitor behavior triggers the movements of the figures via a system of pressure-sensitive devices and computer software. Each projection confronts spectators with different gazes, gestures and attitudes that critics suggest elicit empathy and effect an uncanny, convincing sense of potential exchange. According to writers George Quasha and Charles Stein, this impels a self-conscious turn in viewers to their own reactions and internal processes. For Viewer, Hill projected seventeen day laborers of various ethnic and cultural backgrounds at life-size in a continuous line across a 45-foot-long gallery wall. The men stand silently and almost motionless, gazing impassively at the viewer, creating a mirroring or feedback effect: subject equally scrutinizing viewer for meaning.

Viewer exhibits an anthropological or sociological aspect that Hill took up in different ways in subsequent work. The video installation Accordions (2001–02) and videotape Blind Spot (2003) captured short street-life vignettes of the French-Algerian residents of Belsunce, a working-class area of Marseilles. In the installations Frustrum and Guilt (2006, Fondation Cartier pour l'Art Contemporain), Hill employed material and linguistic metaphors to convey personal responses to role of the United States in the Middle East. Frustrum is cinematic in its presentation, confronting viewers in a darkened gallery with a wall-sized projection of a computer-generated eagle that is trapped—excepting its wings—inside the triangular scaffolding of an electrical pylon. It is perched above a large, rectangular reflecting pool of deep black oil with an ingot of gold bullion in its center.

Gary Hill, Fidelio, Act II, Scene VIII (Finale), performance, Edinburgh Festival, August 8, 2013.

=== Collaborative projects ===
From early on, Hill has collaborated with writers, philosophers, engineers, performers, and others. Among these collaborations are dance, theater and musical works including: Splayed Mind Out (Documenta X, 1997), an intermedia dance performance co-created with choreographer Meg Stuart; Varèse 360° (Holland Festival, 2009), a two-night, mixed-media performance of the composer Edgard Varèse's complete works for which Hill produced the dramaturgy and visual elements; and a restaging of a Beethoven opera in outer space, Fidelio (Opéra de Lyon, 2013).

Splayed Mind Out explored characteristic themes of embodiment, fraught communication, entropy and collapse through a fragmented narrative involving viewing, gesture and interplay between performers and video imagery on portable monitors and a back-wall projection. For Fidelio, Hill recast Beethoven's well-known opera through the lens of Swedish writer Harry Martinson's tragic science-fiction poem Aniara (1956), about an off-course spaceship. His staging integrated computer-generated imaging and live action, in part through the use of an invisible gauze curtain in front of the stage onto which images and graphics were projected. Critic Alexandra Coghlan wrote, "Hill's is undeniably a catalyst show—a masterclass in what is possible if new technologies are harnessed to old scores, offering a truly 21st-century model of gesamtkunstwerk [an all-embracing artwork]."

Hill has also collaborated extensively with the artists/poets George Quasha and Charles Stein. Aside from several publications on the artist’s work, together or singularly, they have performed and collaborated in works including: Why Do Things Get in a Muddle? (Come On Petunia), 1984; Tall Enclosure, 1985; Figuring Grounds, 1985/2008; Disturbance (among the jars), 1988; Two Ways at Once (Deux sens à la fois), 1998; Spring from Undertime (Awaking Awaiting), 2000.

In 2018, Hill participated in 24 Hours with Gary Hill, a marathon interview with twelve art professionals conducted at Arminius, Museumpark during Art Week Rotterdam. In 2021, Hill released You Know Where I’m At and I Know Where You’re At, a book collaboration with Martin Cothren, a Yakama Native American he met by happenstance while scouting for subjects for Viewer. The encounter led to a twenty-year creative exchange documented in the book in drawings and handwritten letters, which like Viewer, explores the encounter with otherness.

== Exhibitions ==
Solo exhibitions of Hill's work have been presented at museums and institutions worldwide, including the Aarhus Kunstmuseum, Center for Contemporary Art, Tel Aviv, Centro Cultural Banco do Brasil, Colosseum and Temple of Venus and Roma, Fundación Centro Cultural Chacao, IMAI (Inter Media Art Institute)/NRW-Forum, LUMA Foundation, MAAT (Museum of Art, Architecture and Technology), Moderna Museet, Musée d'art contemporain de Montréal, Museum of Modern Art, Oi Futuro, San Francisco Museum of Modern Art, Tate Gallery, and Whitney Museum, among others.

Retrospectives and surveys of his work have been held at the Centre Georges Pompidou and Stedelijk Museum (1992); Henry Art Gallery, Hirshhorn Museum, Museum of Contemporary Art Chicago and Museum of Contemporary Art Los Angeles (1994); the Guggenheim Museum (1995); Kunstmuseum Wolfsburg and Centro Cultural de Belém (2001); Museum of Contemporary Art, Taipei (2003); Kunstmuseum Bonn (2011); West Den Haag (2018); Suwon Museum of Art (2019); and Art Museum of Guangzhou Academy of Fine Arts (2024).

== Collections and recognition ==
Hill's work is held in the public collections of the Art Institute of Chicago, Buffalo AKG Art Museum, Centre Pompidou, Centro Cultural Arte Contemporaneo, Fonds régional d'art contemporain (FRAC), Glenstone, Hara Museum of Contemporary Art, Henry Art Gallery, Hirshhorn Museum, Kiasma, Kunstmuseum Wolfsburg, Los Angeles County Museum of Art, Musée d’art contemporain de Montréal, Museo Nacional Centro de Arte Reina Sofia, Museum of Contemporary Art San Diego, Museum of Modern Art, Nationalgalerie (Berlin), National Gallery of Australia, National Museum of Contemporary Art, Athens (EMST), Philadelphia Museum of Art, Portland Art Museum, Pushkin Museum, San Francisco Museum of Modern Art, Seattle Art Museum, Stedelijk Museum, Tate Gallery, Whitney Museum, and Zentrum für Kunst und Medientechnologie (ZKM), among others.

Hill has been awarded fellowships from the Rockefeller Foundation (1981, 1989), John Simon Guggenheim Memorial Foundation (1986, 1990), American Film Institute (1986) and MacArthur Foundation (1998). He has also received grants and fellowships from the National Endowment for the Arts and regional arts organizations in the states of Massachusetts, New York and Washington. In 1995, he was awarded the Leone d'Oro Prize for sculpture at the Venice Biennale, and in 2000, the Rome Prize (American Academy in Rome) and Kurt Schwitters Prize (Niedersächsische Sparkassenstiftung). He received an Arts Innovator Special Recognition Award from Artist Trust in 2011.

== Principal studies ==
The main books on Hill's work include An Art of Limina: Gary Hill’s Works and Writings, George Quasha & Charles Stein, foreword by Lynne Cooke (Barcelona: Ediciones Polígrafa, 2009); Gary Hill: Selected Works and Catalogue raisonné, edited by Holger Broeker (Wolfsburg: Kunstmuseum Wolfsburg, 2002); Gary Hill: Around & About: A Performative View (Paris: Éditions du Regard, 2001); and Gary Hill, edited by Robert C. Morgan (Baltimore: PAJ Books / The Johns Hopkins University Press, 2000).
