= Jonah (poetry collection) =

2005 book by Arthur Boyd and Peter Porter

- Jonah book cover
- Author: Arthur Boyd, Peter Porter
- Language: English
- Subject: Poetry
- Genre: Poetry
- Publisher: Secker & Warburg
- Publication date: 2005
- Publication place: United Kingdom
- Media type: Print (Hardback)
- ISBN: 0-436-37805-1
- OCLC: 903569
- Dewey Decimal: 741.9/94
- LC Class: NC371.B69 P67

Jonah (ISBN 0436378051) is a book of poems by Peter Porter accompanying reproductions of artwork by Arthur Boyd. It was published by Secker & Warburg on 22 October 1973. 2000 copies were printed, and the retail price was £4.75.

Porter had met Boyd at a poetry festival at the Royal Court Theatre in 1965.

The book commences with three pages reproducing an old copy of the Book of Jonah.
