= Miriam Mandel =

Canadian poet (1930–1982)

- Born: Miriam Minovitch; June 24, 1930; Rockglen, Saskatchewan
- Died: February 13, 1982 (aged 51); Edmonton, Alberta
- Citizenship: (Canada) Canadian
- Education: B.A.
- Alma mater: University of Saskatchewan
- Spouse: Eli Mandel
- Children: Evie, Charles
- Writing career
- Language: English
- Notable awards: Governor General's Award

Miriam Mandel (June 24, 1930 – February 13, 1982) was a Canadian poet who won Canada's Governor General's Award.

== Early life ==
Miriam Mandel was born in Rockglen, Saskatchewan. She gained her B.A. from the University of Saskatchewan in 1950. In 1949 she married Eli Mandel, and after her graduation the couple moved to Toronto where he worked on a Ph.D. at the University of Toronto. After he received his doctorate in 1957, they moved to Edmonton, where he taught at the University of Alberta until 1967. The couple had two children. In 1967 the couple divorced and Eli Mandel remarried.

== Career ==
Shortly after their marriage broke up, Miriam Mandel began writing poetry. She won the Governor General's Award in 1973 for her first collection, Lions At Her Face. She later published two more collections of poetry.

Miriam Mandel was a long-time sufferer from depression. Patrick Lane was inspired by her to write his 1983 poem "And of the Measure of Winter We Are Sure".

Miriam Mandel died in Edmonton by suicide.

Novelist Sheila Watson edited Miriam Mandel's Collected Poems in 1984. The Miriam Mandel fonds is at the University of Calgary.

== Bibliography ==
=== Poetry ===
- Lions at Her Face. Edmonton: White Pelican Publications, 1973.
- Station 14. Edmonton: NeWest Press, 1977. ISBN 0-920316-08-5 ISBN 978-0920316085
- Where Have You Been?. Edmonton: Longspoon Press, 1980. ISBN 0-919285-00-7 ISBN 9780919285002
- The Collected Poems of Miriam Mandel. Sheila Watson, ed. Edmonton: Longspoon Press, 1984. ISBN 0-920316-50-6 ISBN 978-0920316504

=== Non-fiction ===
- Miriam Mandel et al. Herpes Handbook: A Guide For the Diagnosis and Management of Herpes Genitals. Toronto: R.E.A.C.H., 1981.
- The Miriam Mandel Papers. Sandra Mortensen, compiler; Apollonia Steele and Jean F. Tener, ed. Calgary: University of Calgary Press, 1990. ISBN 0-919813-61-5 ISSN 0831-4497

Except where noted, bibliographic information courtesy University of Saskatchewan.
