= Imai Foundation =

Museum in Germany

- Established: 2006
- Location: Düsseldorf, Germany
- Director: Dr. Linnea Semmerling
- Website: www.stiftung-imai.de

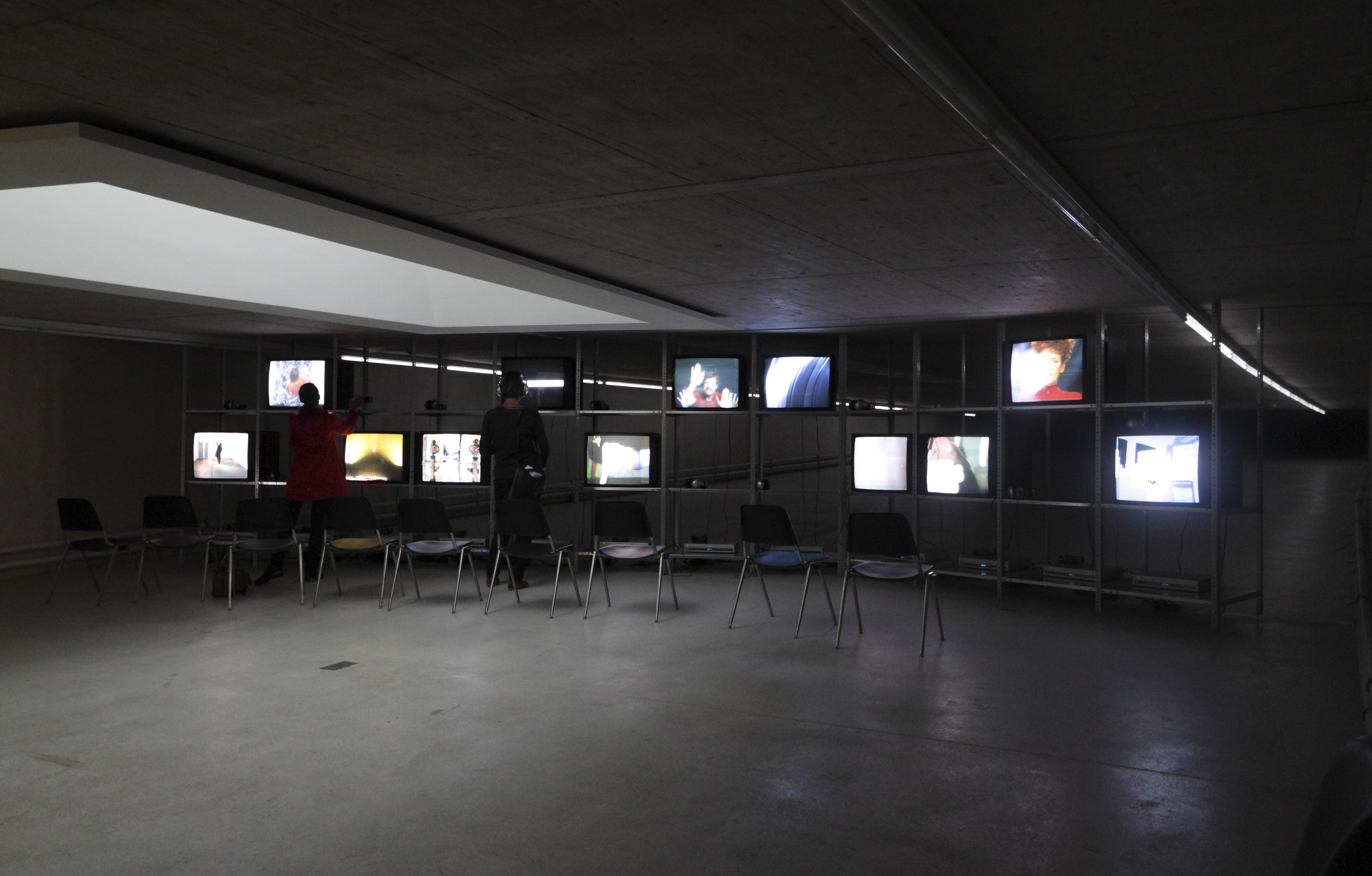
Images Against Darkness. Video art from the archive of imai, Kunst im Tunnel, Düsseldorf, 2012

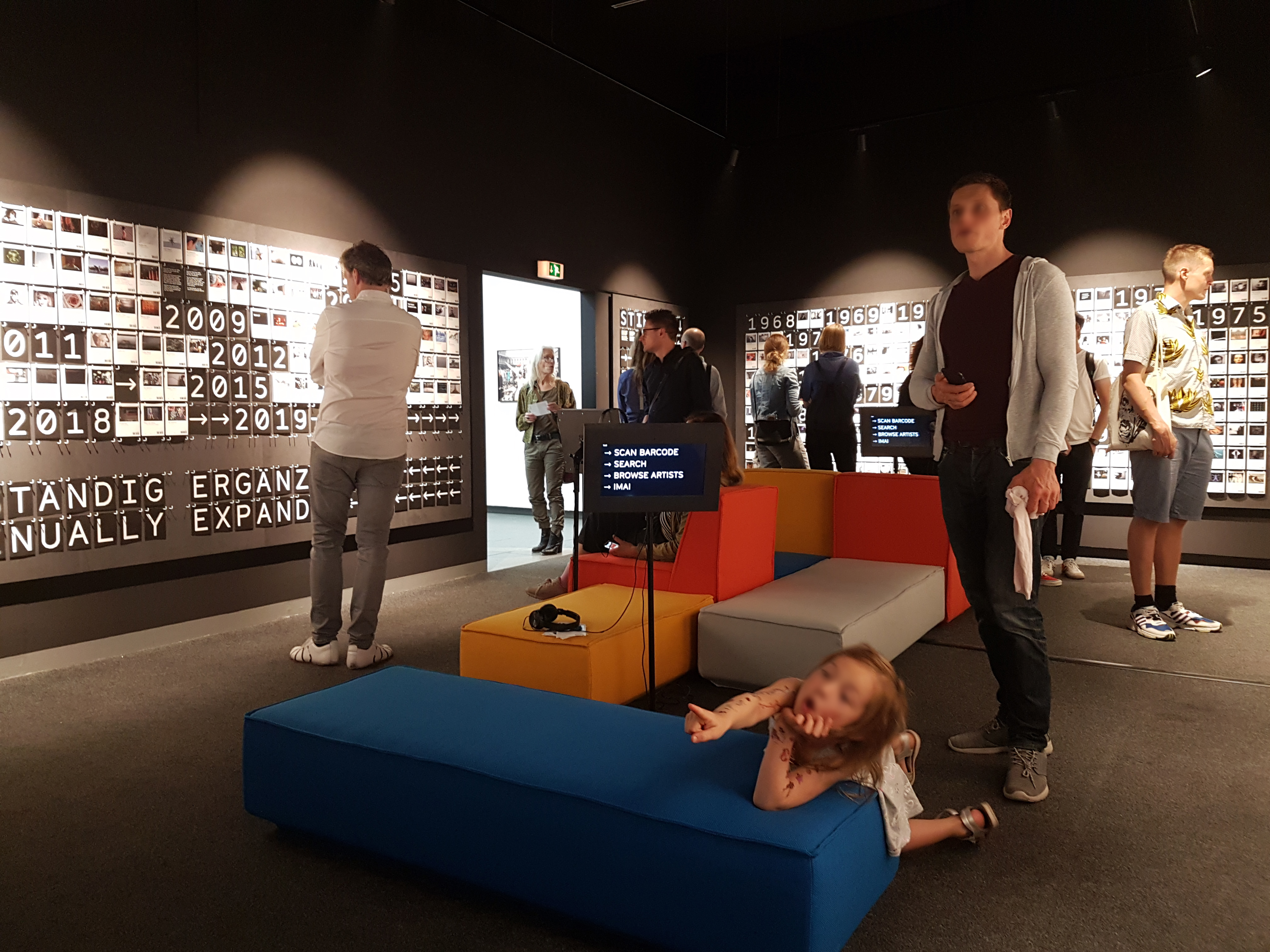
imai Foundation Videolounge, NRW Forum, Düsseldorf, 2019

The imai Foundation was founded in 2006 as imai - inter media art institute. It is an institution dedicated to the preservation, research and distribution of video art and media art and associated activities. The foundation organizes workshops, conferences, screenings, exhibitions, research projects and case studies concerning the current questions of conservation and restoration of media art. It aims to develop further the possibilities of (digital) preservation, presentation and distribution of media art.

== History ==
The main purpose for the founding of the imai Foundation (initially called imai - inter media art institute) was to preserve the large collection of video art tapes which the former video art distributor and media art agency 235 MEDIA held in its archive in Cologne. IMAI was set up with the support of the provincial capital of Düsseldorf and the Cologne media art agency 235 MEDIA. The preservation of the video art archive was funded by the Kunststiftung NRW (art foundation NRW – of the state of North Rhine Westphalia), the 'Kulturstiftung der Länder' (cultural foundation of the Federal states). The IMAI is located in the NRW Forum at the Ehrenhof complex, built by Wilhelm Kreis in 1925–26, close to Kunstakademie Düsseldorf and the museum kunst palast in Düsseldorf, the state capital of North Rhine-Westfalia. The institute is directed by Dr. Renate Buschmann.

The imai offers 40 years of video art at the click of a mouse.

— Dr. Renate Buschmann Foundation Director, 2012

== Archives and collections ==
Now the archive includes approximately 3,000 artistic and documentary works from the era of the 1960s to present. The particular focus is on video art and documentaries about artists, art performances and land art. The collection includes US-American, Asian and European artists now considered some of the pioneers of this relatively young artistic genre, with a focus on works from the end of the 1970s and early 1980s. Audiovisual works, particularly single-channel works, are at the archive. This archive is constantly enriched with new media artworks by contemporary artists.

Some of the artists represented by imai include: Steina and Woody Vasulka, George Barber, Dara Birnbaum, Klaus vom Bruch, Douglas Davis, Valie Export, Ken Feingold, Paul Garrin, Ulrike Rosenbach, Kirsten Geisler, Gary Hill, Dara Birnbaum, Nan Hoover, Valie Export, Jürgen Klauke, Robert Cahen, and Marcel Odenbach.

== Case studies ==
During its ongoing research project to restore media art installations (since 2006), the imai Foundation uses individual case studies to test restoration methods which secured the long-term preservation of technology-based art. imai collaborates with restorers, art historians, technicians and artists. The foundation has realized six case studies so far: The first case study was about Il Nuotatore (va troppo spesso ad Heidelberg) a work by Studio Azzurro from 1984. In Situ (1986) by Gary Hill, Exchange Fields (2000) by Bill Seaman, Testcuts I by Katharina Sieverding (2010), Light Composition: Documenta 8 (1987) by Nan Hoover and Zweileinwandkino (1968/2014) by Lutz Mommartz. The results of the case studies were presented in publications and at several conferences.

== Exhibitions ==
The imai Foundation participated in the Düsseldorf art festival Quadriennale 2010 with Katharina Sieverding. Testcuts. Projected Data Images and participated in Quadriennale 2014 with the exhibition The Invisible Force Behind. Materiality in Media Art. Media artists Holger Mader and Heike Wiermann displayed a light-art projection in the Ehrenhof courtyard that played across the windows of the Belvedere and also at times the fountain area in the inner courtyard of the Museum Kunstpalast. The exhibition Images against Darkness (Bilder gegen die Dunkelheit) at KIT – Kunst im Tunnel presented a selection of video art works from the imai archive for the first time.

== Permanent video lounge ==
In the imai Foundation's video lounge, established in 2019 in the NRW Forum in Düsseldorf, you can research the history of video art from the 1970s to the present day and explore it interactively on tablets, where you may watch up to 1500 video art pieces.

== Members of the Board of Trustees ==
Members of the Board of Trustees are Dr. Andreas Broeckmann (Director ISEA2010_Ruhr and founding Director Dortmunder U), Dr. Söke Dinkla (Director Lehmbruck Museum Duisburg), Prof. Rainer Jacobs (lawyer), Ulrich Leistner (235 MEDIA), Hans-Georg Lohe (Director of Cultural Affairs of the City of Düsseldorf), Prof. Marcel Odenbach (artist), Dr. Ingrid Stoppa-Sehlbach (Cultural Department of the State Chancellery NRW), Beat Wismer (General director of Stiftung Museum Kunstpalast), Julia Stoschek (Julia Stoschek Collection), Doris Krystof (Kunstsammlung NRW).

== Members of the Board ==
Members of the Board are Nicolas Maas (Foundation Schloß Benrath) and Axel Wirths (235 MEDIA).

== Publications ==
The imai Foundation publishes exhibition catalogs and specialist works on the monographic and thematic exhibitions and case studies. A selection:

- Renate Buschmann/Darija Šimunović (Eds.): The Invisible Force Behind: Materialität in der Medienkunst, Kettler Verlag, Bönen 2014. ISBN 978-3-86206-387-1
- Renate Buschmann/Darija Šimunović (Eds.): Die Gegenwart des Ephemeren. Medienkunst im Spannungsfeld zwischen Konservierung und Interpretation, Wiener Verlag für Sozialforschung, Vienna 2014. ISBN 978-3944690148
- Renate Buschmann/Tiziana Caianiello (Eds.): Media Art Installations. Preservation and Presentation. Materializing the Ephemeral imai Reimer Verlag, Berlin 2013. ISBN 978-3-496-01463-8
- imai - inter media art institute (Ed.): Katharina Sieverding. Testcuts. Projected Data Images DuMont, Cologne, 2010. ISBN 978-3-8321-9369-0
- KIT – Kunst im Tunnel/imai - inter media art institute (Eds.): Images against Darkness. Video art from the archive of imai at KIT exhibition catalogue 2012

== See also ==
- New media
- New media art
