= José Miguel Oviedo =

Peruvian writer and literary critic (1934–2019)

José Miguel Oviedo (1934 – 19 December 2019) was a Peruvian writer and literary critic, born in Lima. He received his doctorate from the Pontificia Universidad Católica in 1961, afterwards teaching at the same institution. Coming to the US in 1975, he taught at State University of New York, Indiana University, and UCLA. In 1988 he was appointed Trustee Professor of Latin American Literature at the University of Pennsylvania and remained there until his retirement and move to Emeritus Professor in 2000. He was the recipient of important scholarships such as the Rockefeller grant and the Guggenheim fellowship(1972).

== Scholarly work ==
Oviedo was best known as a scholar of Peruvian and Latin American literature. His critical surveys covered writers such as Ricardo Palma, Mario Vargas Llosa, and José Martí. He also compiled various anthologies of Peruvian prose and poetry, Cuban short stories, 19th century Latin American short stories, etc. His lifelong friendship with Vargas Llosa led to her dedicating her work Who Killed Palomino Molero? to him in 1987.

His principal work was a two-volume history of Latin American literature: Historia de la literatura hispanoamericana. This work was published in four installments between 1995 and 2000; split into:

- De los orígenes a la Emancipación (1995)
- Del Romanticismo al Modernismo (1997)
- Postmodernismo, Vanguardia, Regionalismo ()
- De Borges al presente (2000).

He also published several short story collections:

- Soledad & Compañía (1987)
- La vida maravillosa (1988)
- Cuaderno imaginario (1996).

== Oviedo Prize ==
The University of Pennsylvania created the "José Miguel Oviedo Undergraduate Student Paper Award in Latin American and Latino Studies" in his honor.

== Death ==
Oviedo died in Philadelphia, United States, aged 85.
