= Katia Granoff =

French poet (1896–1989)

Katia Granoff (1895–1989) was a French art dealer and writer of Russian émigré origins.

== Early life ==
Orphaned at the age of sixteen, Granoff studied in Switzerland earning a degree in literature before moving to France.

== Galleries ==
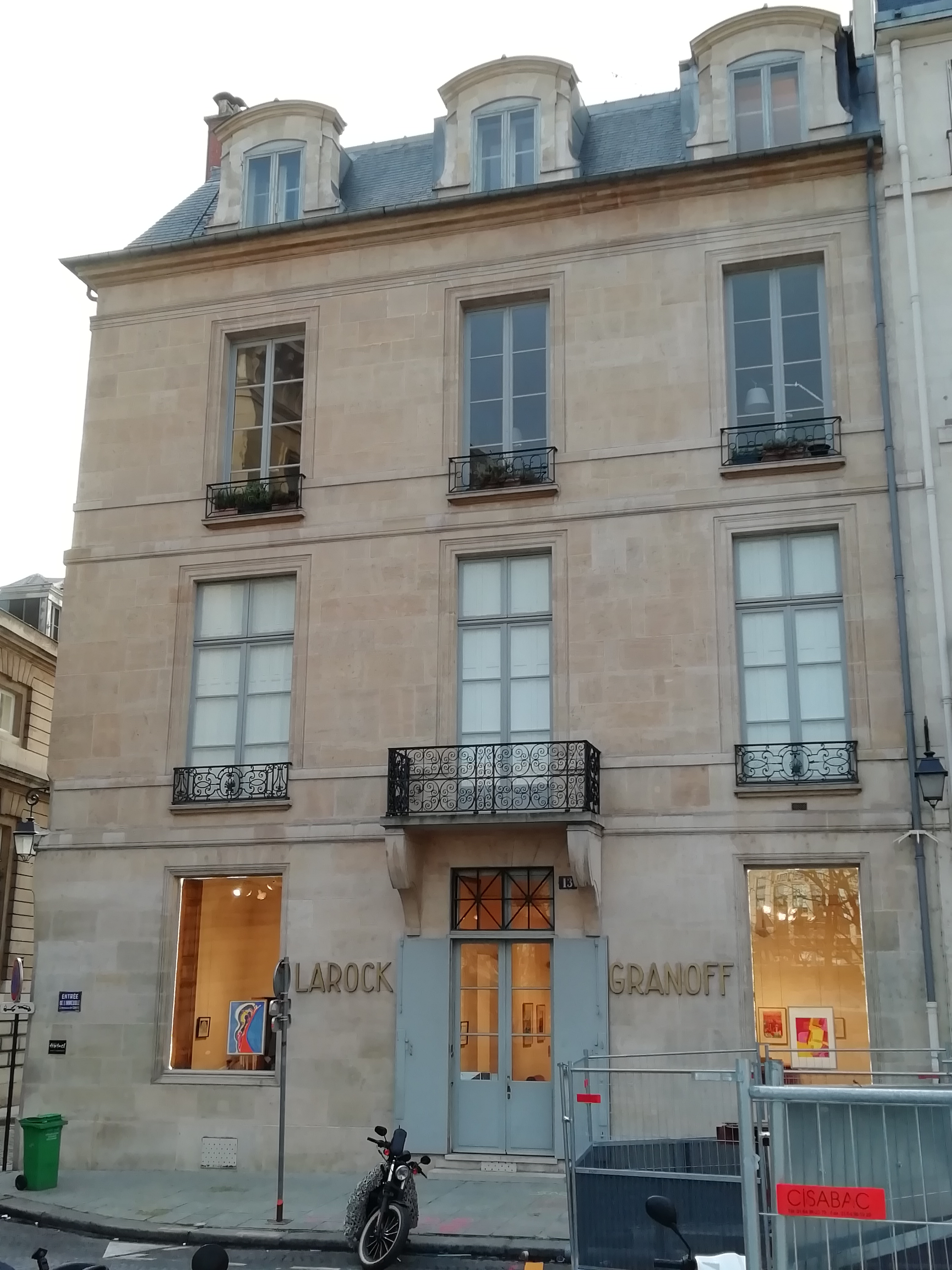
Galerie Larock-Granoff at 13 Quai de Conti, Paris.

In Paris, she opened her first gallery in 1926, dubbed Galerie Katia Granoff, after working as a secretary at the Tuileries. Until 1928, she operated the gallery in association with Rene Lefebure. In 1987, her nephew Pierre Larock and his family took over, and renamed it Galerie Larock-Granoff. She became a French citizen in 1937, but the German occupation forced her to leave Paris. For the duration of the war she lived in a medieval castle along with the painter Georges Bouche, whose work she had shown in her Boulevard Haussman gallery. Following the war, she opened three new galleries in Honfleur, Cannes, and Paris. The Paris gallery, Place Beauveau, was one of the first to exhibit Monet’s The Nympheas. Granoff was a supporter of female artists, and she often exhibited the works of Anne French, Fahrelnissa Zeid, and Chana Orloff.

Granoff retired in 1987 and her eponymous gallery in Paris was renamed Galerie Larock-Granoff under her nephew Pierre Larock.

== Writer ==
Granoff received an award from the French Academy for her Anthology of Russian Poetry (1961), and her later autobiographical works spoke to the relationships between Jews and Christians. Her legacy survives in her many poems and recorded works, sung by the likes of Monique Morelli and Edith Desternes.
