= Chrissie Iles =

British-American art curator, critic, and art historian

Chrissie Iles is a British-American art curator, critic, and art historian. She is the Anne & Joel Ehrenkranz Curator at the Whitney Museum of American Art in New York City.

== Early life and work ==
Chrissie Iles was born in Beirut to British parents Albert Ronald and Isobel Campbell Iles, and grew up in the Middle East before the family relocated to the United Kingdom when she was 10 years old. Iles earned her Bachelor of Arts degree in History and History of Art at University of Bristol, and a postgraduate diploma in arts administration from City University, London.

After graduating, Iles ran Waterloo Gallery and Studios, an experimental art venue with artists studios and a public exhibition space. After the Gallery lost its space, Iles worked as assistant to Robin Klassnik at Matt's Gallery.

== Career ==
In 1988, Iles became Head of Exhibitions at Modern Art Oxford, working with director David Elliott to organize solo exhibitions of Sol LeWitt, Marina Abramović, Louise Bourgeois, John Latham, Gary Hill, Donald Judd, and Yoko Ono, as well as mixed-media thematic exhibitions Signs of the Times: Film, Video and Slide Installations in the 1980s (1990), Scream and Scream Again: Film and Art (1996), and Slide Installations in Britain in the 1980s (1990).

Iles has been the Anne & Joel Ehrenkranz Curator of film and video at the Whitney Museum of American Art since 1997. Despite specializing in time-based media, Iles has overseen exhibitions and acquisitions across multiple media, including sculpture and painting. At the Museum, Iles has organized retrospectives of Dan Graham, Claes Oldenburg, Paul McCarthy, Alan Michelson, Sharon Hayes, Jack Goldstein, and thematic group exhibitions Into the Light: The Projected Image in American Art 1964 – 1977, Riverrun, Dreamlands: Immersive Cinema and Art, as well as co-curating both the 2004 and 2006 Whitney Biennial exhibitions.

In 2001, Iles curated Into the Light: The Projected Image in American Art 1964 – 1977, the first survey exhibition of historical film and video installation in America. The exhibition was met with broad critical acclaim; frieze's Michael Wilson called it a "triumph", lauding the "gutsy attempt by the museum's curator of film and video, Chrissie Iles, to make newly visible a critical period in the development of a now commonplace form" and pulling "off the seemingly impossible by allowing illusion to retain its power while simultaneously revealing its source." Artforum wrote that "it’s a pleasure to return to a moment of joyful infatuation with film". The exhibition was awarded the prize for best theme show in New York in 2001 by the International Association of Art Critics.

== Other activities ==
Iles was a judge for the 2003 Turner Prize, which was awarded to Grayson Perry. Since 2021, she has been a member of the Julia Stoschek Foundation's advisory board.

== Publications and lectures ==
Iles has published and lectured at academic and arts institutions, including the Wexner Center for the Arts, the Whitney Independent Study Program, NYU, the Rhode Island School of Design, the School of Visual Arts—where she is on the Faculty of the Curatorial Practice Masters program—and Columbia University, where she is also a visiting professor. Iles is on the Graduate Committee of the Center for Curatorial Studies at Bard College. Iles has been an external examiner for Columbia University, University of Oxford, the Royal College of Art, London, and Goldsmiths College, London. Iles' writing has been published in Artforum, Art Journal, Art Monthly, Flash Art, Parkett and multiple exhibition catalogs and artist books.

== Honors ==
Iles became the first Art History graduate to be presented with an honorary Doctor of Letters degree from Bristol University in 2015.
