= Who Killed Palomino Molero? =

1986 novel by Mario Vargas Llosa

- First edition (Spanish)
- Author: Mario Vargas Llosa
- Original title: ¿Quién mató a Palomino Molero?
- Language: Spanish
- Genre: Crime novel
- Publisher: Seix Barral
- Publication date: 1986
- Publication place: Peru
- Followed by: Death in the Andes

Who Killed Palomino Molero? (Spanish: ¿Quién mató a Palomino Molero?) is a 1986 novel by Peruvian novelist Mario Vargas Llosa.

The book begins with the discovery of the brutally murdered body of a young recruit, Palomino Molero, from a nearby military base in northern Peru. Vargas Llosa uses the structure of a murder mystery to examine the darker side of human nature, corruption, and class prejudice in Peru of the 1950s.

Death in the Andes also follows the character of policeman Lituma, who first appeared in The Green House.
