= Kirsten Geisler =

German artist (born 1949)

Kirsten Geisler (born 1949 in Berlin) is a German New media artist.

== Vita ==
Geisler studied from 1985 to 1989 at the 'Gerrit Rietveld Academie, "and in 1991 at the Rijksakademie van Beeldende Kunsten in Amsterdam. Kirsten Geisler lives in Berlin and Haarlem.

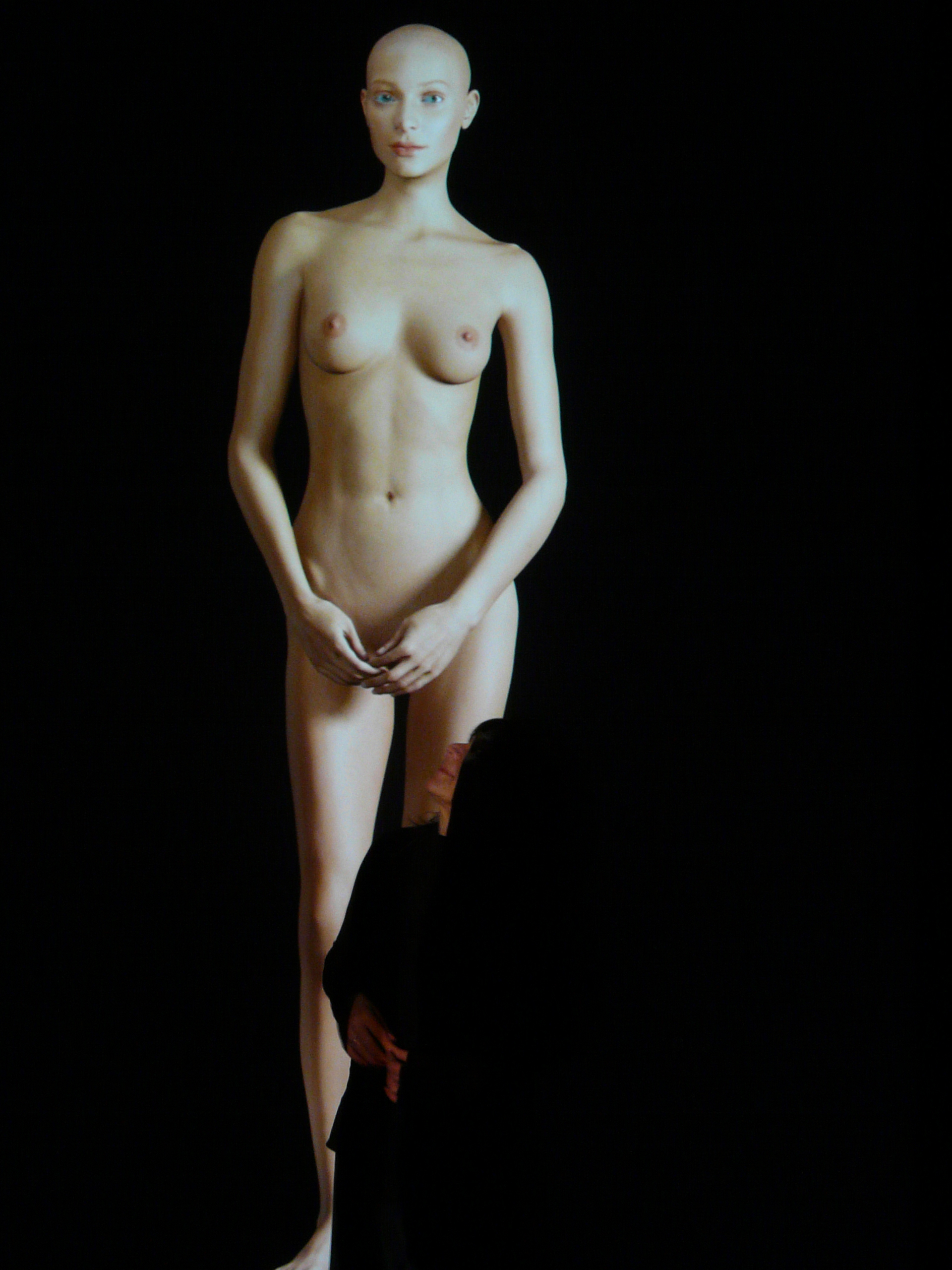
Kirsten Geisler vor Maya Brush

== Work ==
Kirsten Geisler employs in her work with the interface between the real and virtual worlds . They discussed how these worlds are increasingly flowing into each other. Kirsten Geisler developed virtual sculptures using 3D and virtual reality technology. The body, its materiality, its traces and its presence in the media are the issues that shape their work and inspiration. Her work includes only computer-generated 3-D sculptures.

At the beginning created juxtapositions of real and virtual portraits of women such as Who are You?, 1996. Geisler took it to the socio-political debate about the virtual and digital and the construction of identity in a digitally networked world. In the work of the series Virtual Beauties, 1992-1996 the repertoire of the virtual 3-D characters, enhanced by the interaction with the viewer. The series focuses on the manifestation of feminine beauty ideals and reflects the obsession with beauty in a digitized and virtualized society. It works followed with full-length, stereotypical women's bodies such as Dream of Beauty, 1997 - 2000, and" Catwalk I "-." Catwalk II ", 2004, these virtual models created without photographic model you are the synthesis of ideal images of a woman, as they are given us by the media. They correspond to the ideals of the fashion industry and plastic surgery . In "Catwalk II" moves the figure like a model on the catwalk and presented as in a film report from a fashion show.

The development of this series with the version of "Brush Maya", 2011, transcends the boundaries between the real world and virtual world. Moved as a fictional character, Maya Brush in two worlds: the first time, leaving a virtual sculpture, the museum and art institutions dares step into the "real" life in the public media and global communication networks. Kirsten Geisler responds with "Maya Brush" on the increasing interconnectedness of our world: a virtual sculpture, whose body consists of a network of data, combined with his advocacy in the real world of media symbiosis with the global networks of our world.

=== Homo Virtualis - Maya Brush ===
Maya Brush is a virtual, photorealistic sculpture, created by the artist Kirsten Geisler in 2008–2011. Maya Brush consist of bits and bytes; her name is a composition which refers to the tools with which she was put together: a combination of the software Maya and the ZBrush programme.

Maya Brush is the first virtual beauty, an artificial body, oriented at the human beauty ideal, without being created after a personal physical example. As a model she has become the reality of the dream of medial beauty imaginations. Maya Brush represents all the global prefab-girls, the standardized and technically created beauties as propagated by advertising industry and media. As an artificial figure maya floats between the various on- and offline worlds. For the first time a virtual sculpture will be able to leave the museum and art institutions and dare the step into real life. The media public and the global communication networks may serve as her home as well as the museums to which she will always return with her experiences.

Since her birth Renowned fashion photographers as Peter Lindberg and Karl Lagerfeld work with her as model.

== Work in public Collections ==
- Museum für Neue Kunst ZKM, Karlsruhe
- Kunstsammlung NRW, Düsseldorf
- Frans Hals Museum, Haarlem
- Kunstverein, Bremerhaven
- Museo de Arte Contemporáneo de Castilla y León, León
- Kunsthalle Bremen

== Exhibitions ==
2012

- Frans Hals Museum, Haarlem, "Maskerade"
- Museum Villa Rot, Burgrieden-Rot, Jäger und Gejagte - Insekten in der Gegenwartskunst
- Museum - Shoes Or No Shoes - Stone, Antwerpen, SHOES SELECTION n°5
- Sala de Exposiciones Hospedería Fonseca, Salamanca, COLAPSO. UN ENSAYO SOBRE EL FRACASO Y LA RUPTURA

2011

- Kumu, Kulturhauptstadt Tallinn: "gateways. Kunst und vernetzte Kultur"

2010/2011

- Netherlands Media Art Institute, Amsterdam: "Technology Requested"

2009

- Museo Nacional de Bellas Artes, Buenos Aires
- Museo de Arte Contemporáneo de Rosario (MACRO): “HUéSPED”

2008

- Kunstmuseum Bremerhaven: “Die Sammlung”
- Museum Villa Rot, Burgrieden: “In voller Blüte”

2007

- Chelsea Art Museum, New York
- Museum Het Prinsenhof, Delft: “Contour”
- Mildred Lane Kemper Art Museum, St. Louis: “Interface”
- Palazzo delle Arti Napoli, Naples: “Dangerous Beauty”
- Städtische Galerie Ravensburg; Kunstverein Konstanz: ”Leibhaftig”

2006

- MNAC - National Museum of Contemporary Art (Muzeul Național de Artă Contemporană), Bucharest: “Dutch Installation Art”
- Audio Relay, Lafayette, Indiana
- Stadtmuseum Oldenburg: “Das Tier in der Kunst”
- Kunsthalle Osnabrück: “Kunst-Körperlich”

== Catalogues ==
- “In voller Blüte”, Museum Villa Rot, Burgrieden, 2008
- “Contour”, Museum Het Prinsenhof, Delft, 2007
- “Interface”, Mildred Lane Kemper Art Museum, Washington, 2007
- “Dangerous Beauty”, Chelsea Art Museum, New York, 2007
- “Dutch Installation Art”, National Museum of Contemporary Art, Bukarest, 2006
- “Das Tier in der Kunst”, Stadtmuseum Oldenburg, 2006
- “Kunst-Körperlich”, Kunsthalle Dominikanerkirche, Osnabrück, 2006
- “Leibhaftig”, Kunstverein Konstanz, 2006
- “Carrera de Fondo”, Concejeria de Cultura, Junta de Andalucia, 2005
- “Brides of Frankenstein”, San Jose Museum of Art, San Jose, 2005
- “Summer of Beauty”, Stedelijk Museum, Amsterdam, 2005

== See also ==
- List of German painters
