= Eli Mandel =

Canadian poet, editor, and literary academic

- Born: Elias Wolf Mandel; December 3, 1922; Estevan, Saskatchewan, Canada
- Died: September 3, 1992 (aged 69); Toronto, Ontario, Canada
- Spouse(s): Miriam Mandel, Ann Hardy
- Children: Evie, Charles, Sara
- Writing career
- Notable awards: Governor General's Award

Eli Mandel (December 3, 1922 – September 3, 1992) was a Canadian poet, editor of many Canadian anthologies, and literary academic.

== Biography ==
Eli Mandel died in relative obscurity. A series of strokes had left him unable to write and, as a result, Mandel had receded from public view long before his death.

He was born Elias Wolf Mandel in Estevan, Saskatchewan, Canada to Russian Jewish parents who had emigrated from Ukraine, and grew up the Canadian prairies during the Great Depression. After a job working for a pharmacist who, landed him a position serving in Canada's Medical Corps during World War II, it has been said Mandel returned a forever emotionally distraught man who was destined to live the rest of his life without a sense of belonging. This helps explain the alienation that is illustrated throughout his writings.

He studied English at the University of Saskatchewan attaining a Master of Arts degree in 1950. He received a PhD from the University of Toronto in 1957.

From 1953 to 1957, Mandel taught at the Royal Military College Saint-Jean. Later, he taught English and creative writing at the University of Alberta, University of Victoria, University of Toronto, and York University. He also taught Canadian studies at the University of Calgary.

Besides his poetry, he wrote other critical works such as his 1969 essay on fellow poet Irving Layton.

He was married to his first wife, Miriam Mandel, for 18 years. The couple had two children, Evie and Charles. In 1967 they divorced and he married Ann Hardy. They had one child, Sara.

Publishing poetry in the early 1950s, Eli Mandel's first significant collection was entitled Minotaur poems (1954), and it appeared in the contact press anthology Trio (1954).

His poetry was published in 1954 in Trio, an anthology of poems by Mandel, Gael Turnbull, and Phyllis Webb published by Raymond Souster's Contact Press.

His first book was Fuseli poems (1960).

His works seem to have been deeply influenced by World War II, especially all the horrors of the Jewish concentration camps. Despite the lack of direct references to the war until Stony Plain (1973), his work illustrates many grim and morbid images of despair, destruction written with a tone of inescapable pessimism.

Mandel's style was contemplative and intellectual - "an ironic poet, rather than an angry one". The lack of emotion heightens a hopeless outlook, a central feature in all of his writing. His early works appear to have been written for "a scholarly rather than public audience" due to their literary complexity. In his later work, however, starting with the poetry of Black and Secret Man (1964), Mandel simplifies the syntax and uses more colloquial language. While the thoughtful view remained as it was in his earlier work, a wittier tone replaced the previously somber one.

He was also a critic and editor, producing a monograph on his fellow-poet Irving Layton, and an anthology, Poetry62/Poésie62(1962), which he co-edited with Jean-Guy Pilon. Additionally, he championed many otherwise unnoticed newcomers of the 1950s such as Al Purdy, Milton Acorn, D. G. Jones and Alden Nowlan.

== Critical reception ==
Eli Mandel's book, The Family Romance (1986), has been characterized by his quotations from essays on Hugh MacLennan and Northrop Frye’s The Great Code. Both excerpts exemplify Mandel’s questioning of whatever is viewed as orthodoxy. He refuses to let pass what most people simply accept. In this essay collection, it has been recognized that the first piece, Auschwitz and Poetry, is the most powerful and significant and the last of this series of essays, The Border League: American ‘West’ and Canadian ‘Region’, seems to be the least successful.

The compilation of Mandel’s work, The Other Harmony: the Collected Poetry of Eli Mandel, is a two volume collection, with the first including Mandel’s contributions to Trio, as well has his books Fuseli Poems, An Idiot Joy, Stony Plain, and others. It has been acknowledged as the more noteworthy of the two volumes in terms of its primary material.

Eli Mandel's literary papers are held by the University of Manitoba Archives and Special Collections.

== Recognition ==
Mandel won the 1968 Governor General's Award for An Idiot Joy.

In 1982 he was elected a Fellow of the Royal Society of Canada.

In 1989 he was made an honorary Doctor of Letters by York University.

== Publications ==
=== Poetry ===
- 1954: Trio: First Poems by Gael Turnbull, Phyllis Webb, and Eli Mandel. Toronto: Contact Press, 1954.
- 1960: Fuseli Poems
- Black and Secret Man. (Toronto: Ryerson, 1964)
- 1967: An Idiot Joy (Hurtig)
- Crusoe: Poems Selected and New (Toronto: Anansi, 1973)
- 1973: Stony Plain (Porcepic) ISBN 0-88878-010-9
- 1977: Out Of Place (Porcepic) ISBN 0-88878-074-5
- 1981: Life Sentence: Poems and Journals: 1976-1980
- 2000: The Other Harmony: The Collected Poetry of Eli Mandel, compilation (Canadian Plains Research Centre) ISBN 0-88977-138-3

=== Criticism ===
- 1966: Criticism: The Silent-Speaking Words, Eight Talks for CBC Radio (CBC Publications)
- 1969: Irving Layton (Forum House), edited by William French
- 1977: Another Time (Porcepic) ISBN 0-88878-077-X
- 1986: The Family Romance (Turnstone) ISBN 0-88801-103-2

=== Other works ===
- 1981: Dreaming Backwards, compilation of revisions from 1954 to 1981 (General) ISBN 0-7736-1091-X

=== Edited ===
- Poets of Contemporary Canada, Toronto: McClelland & Stewart (New Canadian Library).

== Discography ==
- 2001: Celebration: Famous Canadian Poets CD Canadian Poetry Association — ISBN 1-55253-031-0 (CD#2) (with Dorothy Livesay )

== See also ==
- Canadian literature
- Canadian poetry
- List of Canadian poets
