= The Green House =

1966 novel by Mario Vargas Llosa

- First edition (Spanish)
- Author: Mario Vargas Llosa
- Original title: La casa verde
- Language: Spanish
- Publisher: Seix Barral
- Publication date: 1966
- Publication place: Peru

The Green House (Original title: La Casa Verde) is the second novel by the Peruvian writer Mario Vargas Llosa, published in 1966. The novel is set over a period of forty years (from the early part of the 20th century to the 1960s) in two regions of Peru: Piura, a dusty town near the coast in the north, and Peruvian Amazonia, specifically the jungle region near the Marañón river.

== Background ==
The novel was inspired by memories of the author's youth in Piura and a journey through the jungle he made in 1958. Vargas Llosa has described the novel as "a fusion of very different experiences" that had impressed him.

The oldest of the stories that compose the book dates back to Piura: ″It's a story of a brothel in Piura, which I remember vividly from when I was in fifth grade of grammar school. It was a green house – or cabin – in the middle of the dunes, on the outskirts of the city, right in the desert, across the river. For us children there was something fascinating about it. Of course I never dared go anywhere near it. Still it left quite an impression on me.″ Six years later Vargas Llosa visited the place and found out that "it had a very strange atmosphere″; ″It was nothing but a single huge room, where the women were, and where there was a three-man combo made up of an old blind man, playing the harp, a guitarist known as ′el Joven′ (The Young One), and a lumbering giant who looked like a catch-wrestler or a truckdriver, who played the drums and cymbals and was known as Bolas (Balls). Because they're almost mythical characters to me, I've kept their names intact in the book. So the clients used to come in there and take the women out to make love in the dunes, under the stars. It's something I've never been able to forget."

The author also picked up several stories during his trip through the jungle in 1958 that was used in the novel, including the story about one of the main characters, Fushia.

== Structure ==
The story is broken into five parts, each of which begins with an impressionistic narrative without paragraph breaks. Each part is then broken into chapters (Parts One and Three have four chapters each; Parts Two and Four, three). Each chapter is further divided into five separate narratives: 1) Bonifacia in the jungle region, 2) Fushia and Aquilino on the Marañón, 3) Anselmo in Piura, 4) various characters involved in power struggles in the jungle, and 5) Lituma and Bonifacia in Piura. The novel concludes with a five-chapter epilogue.

Vargas Llosa adds to this narrative complexity by referring to characters obliquely ("the lieutenant", "the native", etc.) and by telling the story non-chronologically (parallel narratives may be decades apart). He also creates double narratives within chapters without clear demarcation. The effect is to interweave past and present and to suggest an omnipresent and continuing corruption and brutality.

== Plot synopsis ==
In the desert:

During the early years of the 20th century, a mysterious stranger named Anselmo, whose origins and motives are never explained, builds a popular brothel, the Green House, in the desert on the outskirts of Piura.

Antonia (Tonita) is left for dead after her adoptive parents are killed by bandits; her eyes and tongue are plucked out by vultures, but she survives and is raised by a poor villager, Juana Barra, until Anselmo abducts and keeps her in a room in a tower of the Green House as his wife. She dies giving birth to a daughter, Chunga. Outraged, the village priest, Father Garcia, leads the townspeople to burn down the Green House. Grief-stricken, Anselmo becomes a homeless drunkard, supporting himself by playing the harp in the town's bars and brothels. His daughter, Chunga, grows up in this environment and eventually builds a new Green House, where Anselmo plays his music.

In the 1930s, a Piuran native, Lituma, joins the military (in a drunken burst of patriotism after the Piuran born colonel, Luis Miguel Sánchez Cerro, becomes President of Peru through a military coup). Lituma serves in the Amazon region, where he meets his future bride, Bonifacia. They return to Piura and live together until Lituma takes part in a fatal game of Russian roulette and is sentenced to ten years in jail. While he is away, his friends rape Bonifacia, who then becomes a prostitute at the Green House. At novel's end, Lituma has returned to Piura and is living off his wife's income from prostitution.

In the jungle:

During the 1920s, after escaping from prison in Brazil (he had been arrested for accounting theft), Fushia flees to Peru, where he meets a poor water vendor, Aquilino. Together, they trade goods by boat to rubber and timber workers and gold prospectors. Meanwhile, an infant girl, an Aguaruna native (later named Bonifacia), is taken from her father, Jum, to be raised in a mission in Santa María de Nieva, where the nuns "civilize" the native girls.

Fushia is once again forced to flee because of his thieving ways, and after encountering Huambisa natives, ends up in Iquitos, where with Julio Reategui he takes part in the illegal rubber trade (it is the early 1940s and there is a renewed demand for rubber; since Peru officially is trading rubber only to the Allies, there is a thriving black market). While in Iquitos, Fushia seduces fifteen-year-old Lalita. After his role in the black market is discovered, he arranges to trade Lalita to Reategui for a boat and provisions, but Lalita escapes upriver with Fushia. They live on an island on the Santiago River deep within the jungle.

Jum, after being educated by two political organizers, creates native co-ops for trading rubber, thus interrupting the system of kickbacks that has enriched Reategui. With a military force led by Reategui, Jum is caught, tortured, and publicly shorn of his hair, an emasculating act to the Aguarauna. Aided by the Huambisa, Fushia assaults native villages, stealing rubber and hides, and abducting barely pubescent girls for his concubines. He is assisted by the humiliated Jum, Aquilino, and Adrian Nieves. Lalita, tired of Fushia's abusive ways, escapes with Nieves to Santa Maria de Nieva, where they take in Bonifacia after she has been expelled from the mission for helping newly abducted native girls escape. There she meets and marries Sergeant Lituma. Nieves is eventually sent to jail. Lalita marries one of Lituma's former comrades. And Fushia, who has contracted leprosy, spends his fortune to covertly enter the leper colony at San Pablo. He lives a lonely life there, visited once a year by his aging friend Aquilino.

== Characters ==
- Anselmo: a mysterious stranger who arrives in Piura to build a brothel called the Green House.
- Antonia (Tonita): a child left for dead by bandits, she dies giving birth to Anselmo's daughter, Chunga.
- Aquilino: Fushia's reluctant partner in crime, he has worked on the river for 20 years as a pilot and merchant.
- Bonifacia: an Aguaruna native abducted and raised by nuns, she marries Sergeant Lituma only to become a prostitute at the Green House.
- Chunga: Anselmo's daughter, she becomes madame of the new Green House.
- Fushia: from Brazil and of Japanese descent, he is a sadist, criminal, leader of warrior natives, and leper.
- Josefino: a resident of Piura and friend of Lituma, he rapes Bonifacia.
- Jum: an Aguaruna native and father of Bonifacia, he works with Fushia .
- Lalita: Fushia's lover, she starts a new life with Adrian Nieves.
- Sergeant Lituma: a resident of Piura and husband of Bonifacia, he serves in the Peruvian military in the Amazonia region before returning to his home town.
- Adrian Nieves: a river pilot involved in the capture of Bonifacia, he works for Fushia and has three children with Lalita.
- Julio Reategui: the son of a rubber merchant, he colludes with Fushia on the illegal rubber trade and becomes provincial Governor.
