= Lynne Cooke =

Australian art historian

Lynne Cooke is an Australian-born art scholar. Since August 2014 she has been the Senior Curator, Special Projects in Modern Art, at the National Gallery of Art, Washington, DC.

== Early life and education ==
Born in Geelong, Australia, Cooke received her B.A. from Melbourne University and an M.A. and Ph.D. in art history from the Courtauld Institute, University of London.

== Career ==
=== 1970s ===
The 1974 exhibition A Room of One’s Own: Three Women Artists, co-curated by Cooke, Kiffy Rubbo, and Janine Burke, helped initiate the Women's Art Movement in Melbourne. The following year, Rubbo commissioned Burke to curate the national touring exhibition Australian Women Artists 1840–1940.

=== 1980s ===
From 1979 to 1989, Cooke was a Lecturer in the History of Art Department at University College London, and prior to her move to the United States and appointment as curator at the Dia Art Foundation (1991 to 2008), Cooke established herself during the mid-80s as a writer on contemporary artists of the period, including British sculptors Anish Kapoor and Bill Woodrow, and American artist Allan McCollum. During her years at Dia, she has worked to bring greater recognition to women artists who contributed to the minimalist period, organising exhibitions and publishing writings on Jo Baer, Louise Bourgeois, Bridget Riley, and Agnes Martin, among others, In addition to developing historical projects with artists of the established Dia collection, nearly all of whom are male and became prominent during the 1960s, she organised significant exhibitions aimed at introducing European artists of the 1980s to the American public, such as Rosemarie Trockel, Katharina Fritsch, Juan Muñoz, and Thomas Schütte.

She was a co-curator of the Venice Biennale in 1986.

=== 1990s–2000s ===
Cooke was a co-curator of the Carnegie International in 1991, and was artistic director of the Biennale of Sydney in 1996.

From the mid-1990s forward, Cooke has organised a number of exhibitions of younger American women artists, including Jessica Stockholder, Ann Hamilton, and Roni Horn, and worked on several projects with male artists all born outside of the United States. In addition to her work at the Dia Center for the Arts, she has curated exhibitions at many galleries, including the Arnolfini Gallery, Bristol; Whitechapel Art Gallery and Hayward Gallery, London; Third Eye Center, Glasgow; Institute of Contemporary Art, Boston; and the Tamayo Museum, Mexico.

In 2007, she co-curated Richard Serra's exhibition "Richard Serra Sculpture: Forty Years," at the Museum of Modern Art in New York.

Cooke was the deputy director and chief curator at the Museo Reina Sofia, Madrid, Spain, (2008 to 2012).

She was appointed Senior Curator, Special Projects in Modern Art, at the National Gallery of Art, Washington, DC, effective from 11 August 2014.

== Other activities ==
Cooke has taught and lectured regularly at the University College London, Syracuse University, Yale University, Columbia University, and the Center for Curatorial Studies at Bard College. She has written widely about contemporary art in exhibition catalogues and in Artforum, Artscribe, The Burlington Magazine, and Parkett.

Cooke was a member of the juries that selected Doris Salcedo (2016), Isa Genzken (2019), Michael Rakowitz (2020), Otobong Nkanga (2024) and Petrit Halilaj (2027) for the Nasher Prize.

== Recognition ==
In 2006, Cooke was the recipient of the Award for Curatorial Excellence from the Center for Curatorial Studies at Bard College.
