= George Quasha =

American artist and poet (born 1942)

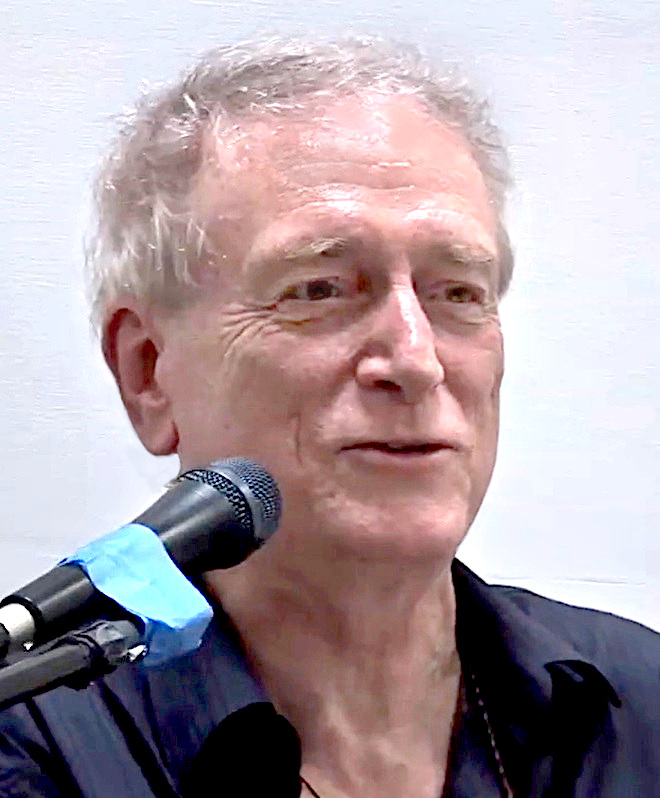
- Quasha at Tspace in 2011
- Born: 1942 (age 83–84)
- Known for: sculpture, video art, writing
- Awards: Guggenheim fellow

George Quasha (born 1942) is an American artist and poet who works across media, exploring language, sculpture, drawing, video art, sound and music, installation, and performance. He lives and works in Barrytown, New York.

== Early life ==
Quasha was born on July 14, 1942, in White Plains, New York, and grew up in Florida.

== Work ==
His axial stones are delicately balanced sculptures of two (occasionally three) stones positioned one upon another at the most precarious point discovered. "Axial" refers to the invisible axis that comes into focus at the moment of precarious balance. In addition to axial stones, Quasha has created axial drawings, executed with two hands simultaneously; axial drumming/music, non-metrical pulsation-based rhythm arising from interaction of instruments, sounds, surfaces; and axial poems, discovering points of charged variability in actual language use and bringing about a self-actualizing process.

For his video installation work art is: Speaking Portraits, which includes multiple volumes (art is, music is, poetry is, he has recorded over 800 artists, poets, and composers (in 11 countries and 21 languages). Just the face of each person is shown at the moment of saying, for instance, what art is. The work has been exhibited at the Snite Museum of Art (University of Notre Dame), at White Box in Chelsea, at the Samuel Dorsky Museum (SUNY New Paltz), and in several other countries (including France and India), and has been featured in several biennials (Wroclaw, Poland; Geneva, Switzerland; Kingston, New York). Further extensions of this work in speaking portraiture include myth is and peace is.

Quasha has collaborated extensively with artists Gary Hill and Charles Stein in the areas of video, language, sound and performance.

His work of preverbs extends this principle (axial/liminal/configurative) in discrete acts of language called preverbs. He wrote in the second vol.: "A preverb, in this special usage, as distinguished from proverb, is a saying in a state of language that stands previous to any claim on wisdom... It contains a certain wild, which here aims to preserve the rich complexity and uncertainty of the impulse to state truth and to protect the mind against oversimplified interpretation." He has spoken about this principle in relation to the poetics of Jackson Mac Low and David Antin.

With Susan Quasha he is founder/publisher of Barrytown/Station Hill Press.

== Exhibitions ==
Solo exhibitions of his axial stones and axial drawings have taken place at the Baumgartner Gallery in New York (Chelsea), the Slought Foundation in Philadelphia, and the Samuel Dorsky Museum of Art at SUNY New Paltz. This work is also featured in the book, Axial Stones: An Art of Precarious Balance, Foreword by Carter Ratcliff (North Atlantic Books: Berkeley, 2006).

== Awards ==
In 2006 he was awarded a Guggenheim Fellowship in video art. Other awards include a National Endowment for the Arts Fellowship in poetry. He has taught at Stony Brook University (SUNY), Bard College, New School University (Graduate Anthropology Department), and Naropa University.

== Bibliography ==
- America a Prophecy: A New Reading of American Poetry from Pre-Columbian Times to the Present (with Jerome Rothenberg), Random House: 1974)
- Open Poetry (with Ronald Gross, Simon & Schuster: 1973)
- Somapoetics (Sumac Press: 1973)
- An Active Anthology (with Susan Quasha, Sumac Press: 1974)
- Word-Yum (Metapoetics Press: 1974)
- Giving the Lily Back Her Hands (Station Hill Press, 1979)
- HanD HearD/liminal objects: Gary Hill’s Projective Installations, Number 1 (with Charles Stein, Station Hill Press: 1997)
- Tall Ships: Gary Hill’s Projective Installations, Number 2 (with Charles Stein, Station Hill Press: 1997)
- Viewer: Gary Hill’s Projective Installations, Number 3 (with Charles Stein, Station Hill Press: 1997)
- Ainu Dreams (with Chie Hasegawa, Station Hill Press: 1999)
- The Station Hill Blanchot Reader: Fiction & Literary Essays (ed. George Quasha, Station Hill Press: 1999)
- Gary Hill: Language Willing (further/art and Boise Art Museum: 2002)
- Axial Stones: An Art of Precarious Balance (North Atlantic: 2006), foreword Carter Ratcliff
- An Art of Limina: Gary Hill's Works and Writings, with Charles Stein (Poligrafa: 2009), foreword Lynne Cooke.
- Verbal Paradise (preverbs) (Zasterle Press: 2010)
- Scorned Beauty Comes Up From Behind (preverbs) (Between Editions: 2012)
- Speaking Animate (preverbs) (Between Editions: Barrytown, NY: 2014)
- Glossodelia Attract (preverbs) (Barrytown/Station Hill Press: 2015)
- Things Done for Themselves (preverbs) (2015: Marsh Hawk Press)
- The Daimon of the Moment (preverbs) (Talisman House Press: 2015)
- art is (Speaking Portraits) (Performance Ideas: PAJ, 2016)
- "Divine Revelation in the Literal Expression, Journal for Cultural and Religious Theory: Special Issue on "Thomas J. J. Altizer and Radical Theology" (Winter 2019-20) 19:1 189-201. https://jcrt.org/archives/19.1/
