= In Praise of the Stepmother =

1988 novel by Mario Vargas Llosa

- First edition (Spanish)
- Author: Mario Vargas Llosa
- Original title: Elogio de la madrastra
- Language: Spanish
- Publisher: Arango
- Publication date: 1988
- Publication place: Peru
- Media type: Print (Hardback & Paperback)
- Pages: 198
- Preceded by: The Storyteller
- Followed by: Death in the Andes

In Praise of the Stepmother is an erotic novel by Peruvian writer Mario Vargas Llosa, winner of the Nobel Prize in Literature in 2010. Published in 1988, it is about a sexually open couple whose fantasies lead them to the edge of morality.

The book is dedicated to Spanish film director Luis García Berlanga. The English translation published in 1990 was done by Helen Lane.

== Story ==
Lucrecia and Rigoberto are an upper middle class married couple. On the outside, they look like an average Peruvian couple of their social class. However, they have a rich and open sexual relationship that enriches their life. Their openness with sexuality, however, turns dangerous when Lucrecia starts a relationship with her pre-teen stepson, Fonchito, which ultimately leads to the unraveling of the marriage.

== Main themes ==
This is a book of the erotic novel genre that reflects on the meaning of happiness, sexual morality, and the loss of innocence. It incorporates essays and poetry into the narrative. It also has vivid descriptions and analysis of famous art representing erotic scenes, in particular from the Peruvian painter Fernando de Szyszlo and the Flemish master Jacob Jordaens.

== Main characters ==
- Don Rigoberto – Husband of Lucrecia and father of Alfonsito (Fonchito),
- Doña Lucrecia – Second wife of Rigoberto and stepmother of Alfonsito,
- Alfonsito (Fonchito) – Son of Don Rigoberto,
- Justiniana – Domestic Employee

== Related books ==
In 1997 Vargas Llosa published Notebooks of Don Rigoberto, a follow-up novel that also belongs to the erotic novel genre.
