= Harsh Times =

Harsh Times may refer to:

- Harsh Times (film), 2005 American action crime film written and directed by David Ayer
- Harsh Times (novel), 2019 novel by writer Mario Vargas Llosa
