= Death in the Andes =

Novel by Mario Vargas Llosa

- First edition (Spanish)
- Author: Mario Vargas Llosa
- Original title: Lituma en los Andes
- Translator: Edith Grossman
- Language: Spanish
- Publisher: Planeta
- Publication date: 1993
- Publication place: Spain
- English publication date: 1996
- Media type: Print
- Pages: 288 p.
- Awards: Premio Planeta de Novela
- ISBN: 84-08-01047-6
- OCLC: 36562390

Death in the Andes (Lituma en los Andes) is a 1993 novel by the Nobel Prize-winning Peruvian author Mario Vargas Llosa. Civil Guard member Corporal Lituma has been transferred to the rural mountain town of Naccos, where he investigates the disappearances of three men, while under the constant threat of Senderista guerrilla attacks.

The novel won Spain's Premio Planeta de Novela in 1993 and was translated into English in 1996 by Edith Grossman.

== Plot ==
The novel follows the character of Corporal Lituma, who previously appeared in Who Killed Palomino Molero? and The Green House.

Civil Guard policeman Corporal Lituma has been transferred to the tiny Andean community of Naccos, populated almost entirely by laborers for a highway construction project on the verge of being shut down. Lituma, along with his lovesick adjutant Tomás Carreño, are tasked with investigating the disappearances of three men from the village: Demetrio Chanca, a construction foreman and former mayor on the run from the Senderista terrucos, Casimiro Huarcaya, an albino itinerant merchant who claims to be a pishtaco when drunk, and Pedro Tinoco, a mentally disabled and mute man who had been living with the two policemen and performing chores for them.

Interwoven with the story of Lituma's investigations are vignettes about the lives of the three disappeared men, Carreño's one-sided love affair with Mercedes Trelles, and the violent deaths of tourists, ecologists, and other non-working class people at the hands of the Senderista terrucos.

Initially convinced that the terrucos were responsible, Lituma learns more about the spiritual history of the region and begins to suspect that Dionisio and Adriana, the socially powerful owners of the local bar, had something to do with the disappearances. Dionisio formerly led a traveling, spiritually-attuned maenad-like cult, while Adriana helped to kill a pishtaco in her youth. Though the traveling group dispersed, Dionisio and Adriana retain mysterious power and a strong spiritual sense. Lituma becomes convinced that Adriana and Dionisio led the townspeople to sacrifice the three men to the local apus to protect themselves from terrucos, landslides, and closure of the construction site. Though no one is killed, a massive landslide devastates the construction site anyway, and it closes. The now-jobless workers leave Naccos, and Lituma and Carreño receive new postings.

Before the two policemen depart, Mercedes arrives at their station, having had a change of heart, and reconciles with Carreño. Lituma pays a final visit to the bar, where a former worker, angry with Dionisio and Adriana, bitterly confirms Lituma's suspicion: the townspeople together sacrificed the three men and ate their testicles, a taste which he can never wash out of his mouth.

== Themes ==
This novel discusses (and censures) the tactics and motivations of the Shining Path at length. It situates their violence in the context of a premodern world, where life is brutal and death is ever-present, and considers the idea that bloodshed is necessary to make things better, comparing the Shining Path's guerrilla violence to ritualized human sacrifice.

In the novel, Corporal Lituma encounters references to some elements of native Peruvian spirituality, including apus, pishtacos, and mukis. His lack of understanding of Indigenous Andean culture is a significant obstacle in his attempts to discover the truth behind the disappearances in Naccos.

== Style ==
Death in the Andes features Vargas Llosa's technique of interlacing dialogues, a staple of his repertoire which he began using in his first novel, in which two conversations or events that occur at different times are combined. In Death in the Andes, this technique is used when a character is recounting a story of their own, changing indirect discourse to direct discourse and including scene descriptions from both settings in order to create a flashback that feels immersive and active.

== Background ==
In 1982, Vargas Llosa was asked by the Peruvian President Fernando Belaúnde Terry to join the Investigatory Commission, a task force to inquire into the massacre of eight journalists at the hands of the villagers of Uchuraccay. This experience inspired Who Killed Palomino Molero? and Death in the Andes.

The book's epigraph is a quote from William Blake's The Ghost of Abel.

== Reception ==
The novel won Spain's Planeta Novel Prize in 1993.

In a Washington Post review, author and critic Marie Arana praised the book but criticized Grossman's translation. In a review of the English edition in the New York Times, novelist Madison Smartt Bell described the book as "often brilliant" but "confusingly disorganized."

== Sources ==
- Booker, M. Keith (1994), Vargas Llosa Among the Postmodernists, Gainesville, Florida: University Press of Florida, ISBN 978-0-8130-1248-3.
- Franco, Jean (2002), The Decline and Fall of the Lettered City: Latin America in the Cold War, Harvard University Press, ISBN 978-0-674-00842-7.
- Kristal, Efraín (1998), Temptation of the Word: The Novels of Mario Vargas Llosa, Nashville, Tennessee: Vanderbilt University Press, ISBN 978-0-8265-1301-4.
