= The Perpetual Orgy =

Book by Mario Vargas Llosa

The Perpetual Orgy: Flaubert and Madame Bovary
- First edition
- Author: Mario Vargas Llosa
- Original title: La orgía perpetua. Flaubert y Madame Bovary
- Language: Spanish
- Genre: Essay
- Publisher: Seix Barral
- Publication date: 1975

The Perpetual Orgy: Flaubert and Madame Bovary (Spanish: La orgía perpetua. Flaubert y Madame Bovary, 1975) is a book-length essay by the Nobel Prize–winning Peruvian novelist Mario Vargas Llosa which examines Flaubert's 1857 book Madame Bovary as the first modern novel. The first part of The Perpetual Orgy has an autobiographical tone; Vargas Llosa then goes on to examine the structure and meaning of Madame Bovary as well as its role in the development of the modern novel. First published in Spanish in 1975, the book was translated into English in 1986 by Helen Lane.

According to Julian Barnes:

Most of The Perpetual Orgy, at last available in Helen Lane's elegant translation, is a discussion of the genesis, execution, structure and technique of Madame Bovary. It is the best single account of the novel I know. Flaubertistes will instantly set it alongside Francis Steegmuller's classic Flaubert and Madame Bovary; students of literature who want to know how a novel works could not be better advised than to listen to Mr. Vargas Llosa hunched over this masterpiece like some vintage car freak over the engine of a Lagonda.

John Gross, also reviewing the Helen Lane translation for The New York Times, praised the book's treatment of Flaubert's technical mastery:

He [Vargas Llosa] is excellent, however, on more fundamental matters, on the handling of time in the novel (he differentiates four types of Flaubertian time—singular, circular, immobile and imaginary) and on the constantly shifting narrative viewpoint. These may sound like dry technical issues, but Mr. Vargas Llosa brings them to life, and makes it clear how central they are if you want to understand the suppleness and subtlety that Flaubert achieved.
