= The Bad Girl =

2006 novel by Mario Vargas Llosa

- First edition cover
- Author: Mario Vargas Llosa
- Original title: Travesuras de la niña mala
- Translator: Edith Grossman
- Publisher: Alfaguara
- English publication date: October 15, 2007

The Bad Girl (Spanish: Travesuras de la niña mala, transl. The mischief of the bad girl) is a 2006 novel by Peruvian author Mario Vargas Llosa, who won the 2010 Nobel Prize in Literature. An English-language edition translated by Edith Grossman was published the following year.

Journalist Kathryn Harrison approvingly argues that the book is a rewrite (rather than simply a recycling) of the French realist Gustave Flaubert's classic novel Madame Bovary (1856). In Vargas Llosa's version, the plot relates the decades-long obsession of its narrator, a Peruvian expatriate, with a woman with whom he first fell in love when they were both teenagers.
