= A Fish in the Water =

Book by Mario Vargas Llosa

- First edition (publ. Seix Barral)
- Author: Mario Vargas Llosa
- Original title: El pez en el agua
- Subject: Mario Vargas Llosa
- Genre: Autobiography
- Published: 1993
- Publisher: Seix Barral
- Pages: 384
- ISBN: 0571169694

A Fish in the Water (originally published as El pez en el agua in 1993), is the memoir of Peruvian writer Mario Vargas Llosa, who won the Nobel Prize in Literature in 2010. It covers two main periods of his life: the first comprising the years between 1946 and 1958, describes his childhood and the beginning of his writing career in Europe. The second period covers his political involvement in later years culminating with his defeat against Alberto Fujimori in the Peruvian presidential elections.

== Contents ==
The book is divided in twenty chapters in which the writer intersperses his narration with topics about his early life and the events related to his political activity in Peru. Along these memories, Vargas Llosa talks about many important experiences for him, like the event when he knew his father whom he believed dead, his first job in the newspaper La Cronica, his studies and initial political activism at the National University of San Marcos, and others. He also refers the facts related to his political activity, like his participation in the opposite movement to the Peruvian president Alan Garcia in 1987, and his campaign as candidate to the presidency of Peru in 1990. One of the curiosities this work revealed about the writer, was the event when he played in the junior team of Universitario de Deportes, the Peruvian football club he is a supporter of:

One of the happiest days of my life was that sunday when Toto Terry, one of the greatest person in my neighborhood, took me to the national stadium and made me play in the junior team of Universitario de Deportes against the one of Deportivo Municipal. Be entering to that huge field, wearing the cream colored uniform of my team, was not that the best thing that could happen to someone in the world?

— Mario Vargas Llosa.

== Critics ==
A controversial section of the book contains harsh criticism of fellow Peruvian intellectuals who at some point had a difference of opinion, mostly political in nature, with Mr. Vargas, for instance the aggression against then dying writer Julio Ramón Ribeyro.

In an interview with Clifford Landers (Albuquerque, 5 November 1994), translator Helen Lane mentions that she originally translated the title as "A Fish in Water, without the article, and it was changed to A Fish in the Water, thereby losing the parallelism with the English idiom, 'a fish out of water'."
