= Mario Vargas Llosa =

Peruvian novelist and writer (1936–2025)

The Most Illustrious The Marquess of Vargas Llosa OSP OCC
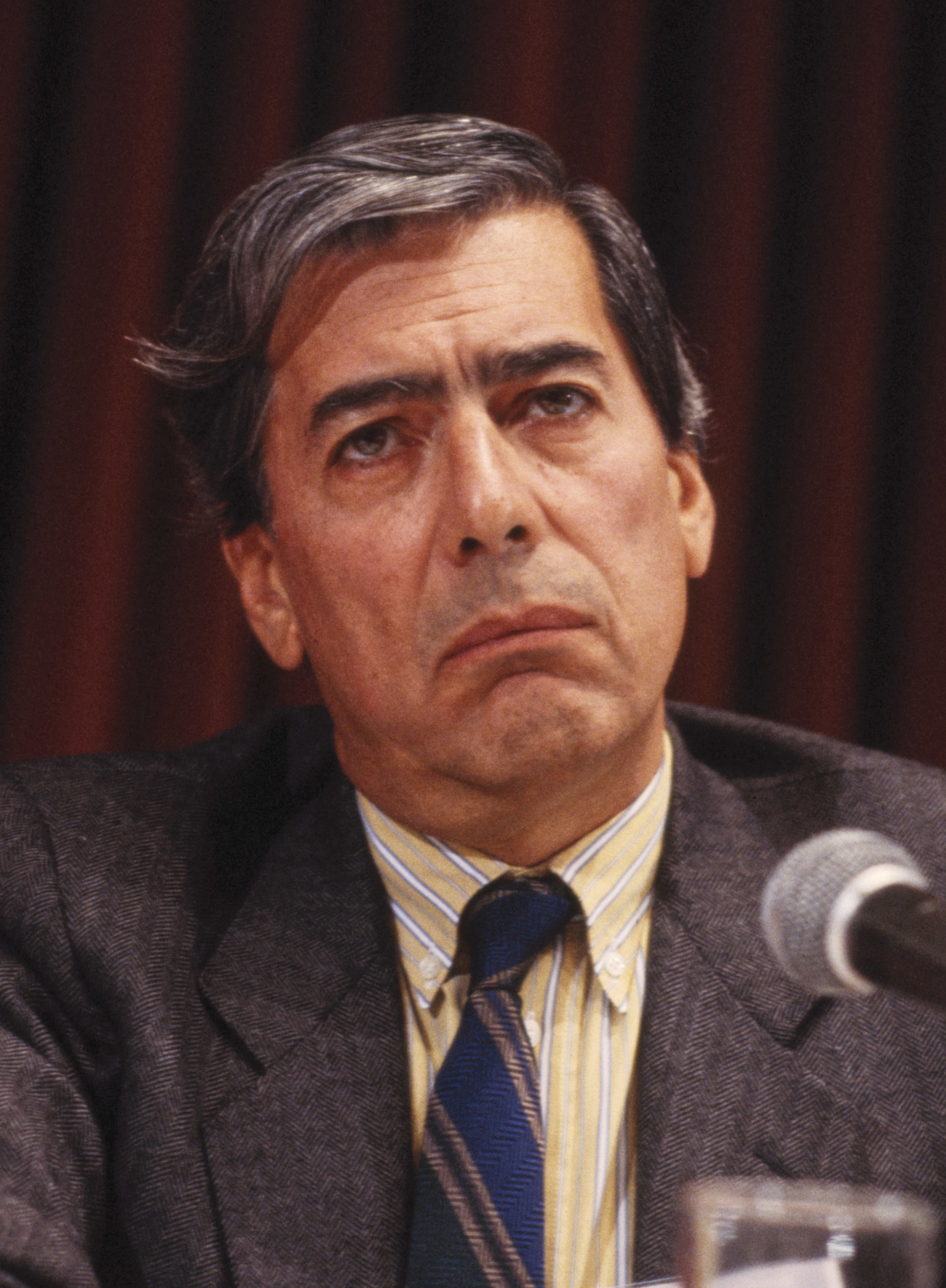
- Vargas Llosa in 1986
- Born: Jorge Mario Pedro Vargas Llosa; 28 March 1936; Arequipa, Peru
- Died: 13 April 2025 (aged 89); Lima, Peru
- Citizenship: Peru; Spain (from 1993); Dominican Republic (from 2023)
- Education: National University of San Marcos; Complutense University of Madrid
- Title: Marquess of Vargas Llosa (from 2011)
- Political party: People's Liberty (2023–2025)
- Other political affiliations: Liberty Movement (1987–1993); Democratic Front (1988–1990)
- Spouses: Julia Urquidi (m. 1955; div. 1964) Patricia Llosa (m. 1965; sep. 2015)
- Partner: Isabel Preysler (2015–2022)
- Children: 3, including Álvaro
- Writing career
- Notable works: The Time of the Hero; The Green House; Conversation in The Cathedral; The War of the End of the World; The Feast of the Goat
- Notable awards: Nobel Prize in Literature; 2010
- Movement: Latin American Boom
- Website: Cátedra Vargas Llosa

Jorge Mario Pedro Vargas Llosa, (Note: Spanish pronunciation: [ˈxorxe ˈmaɾjo ˈpeðɾo ˈβaɾɣaz ˈʎosa]) (Note: In this Spanish name, the first or paternal surname is Vargas and the second or maternal family name is Llosa.) 1st Marquess of Vargas Llosa (28 March 1936 – 13 April 2025) was a Peruvian novelist, journalist, essayist, and politician. Vargas Llosa was one of the most significant Latin American novelists and essayists and one of the leading writers of his generation. Some critics consider him to have had a more substantial international impact and worldwide audience than any other writer of the Latin American Boom. In 2010, he won the Nobel Prize in Literature for "his cartography of structures of power and his trenchant images of the individual's resistance, revolt, and defeat".

Vargas Llosa rose to international fame in the 1960s with novels such as The Time of the Hero (La ciudad y los perros, 1963/1966), The Green House (La casa verde, 1965/1968), and the monumental Conversation in The Cathedral (Conversación en La Catedral, 1969/1975). (Note: The first year given is the original publication date in Spanish; the second is the year of English publication.) He wrote prolifically across various literary genres, including literary criticism and journalism. His novels include comedies, murder mysteries, historical novels, and political thrillers. He won the 1967 Rómulo Gallegos Prize and the 1986 Prince of Asturias Award. Several of his works have been adopted as feature films, such as Captain Pantoja and the Special Service (1973/1978) and Aunt Julia and the Scriptwriter (1977/1982). Vargas Llosa's perception of Peruvian society and his experiences as a native Peruvian influenced many of his works. Increasingly, he expanded his range and tackled themes from other parts of the world. In his essays, Vargas Llosa criticized nationalism in different parts of the world.

Like many Latin American writers, Vargas Llosa was politically active. While he initially supported the Cuban revolutionary government of Fidel Castro, Vargas Llosa later became disenchanted with its policies, particularly after the imprisonment of Cuban poet Heberto Padilla in 1971, and later identified as a classical liberal and held anti–left-wing views. He ran for the presidency of Peru with the centre-right Democratic Front coalition in the 1990 election, advocating for liberal reforms, but lost the election to Alberto Fujimori in a landslide.

Vargas Llosa continued his literary career while advocating for right-wing activists and candidates internationally following his exit from direct participation in Peruvian politics. He was awarded the 1994 Miguel de Cervantes Prize, the 1995 Jerusalem Prize, the 2010 Nobel Prize in Literature, the 2012 Carlos Fuentes Prize, and the 2018 Pablo Neruda Order of Artistic and Cultural Merit. In 2011, Vargas Llosa was made Marquess of Vargas Llosa by the Spanish king Juan Carlos I. In 2021, he was elected to the Académie Française.

== Early life and family ==
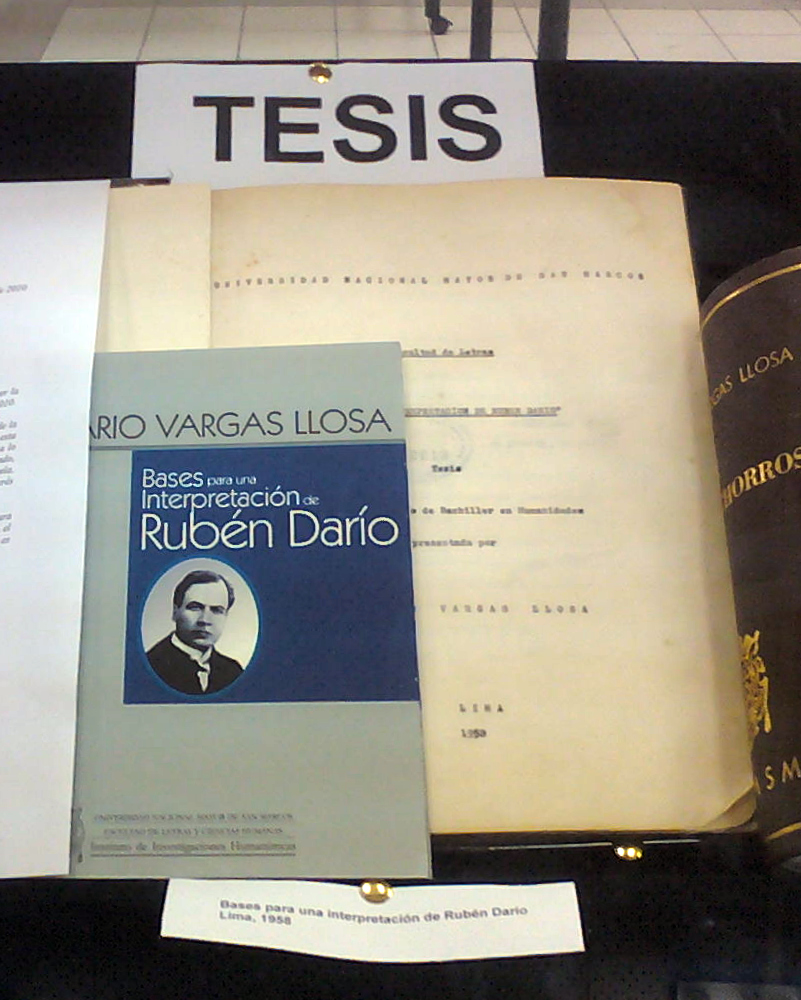
Vargas Llosa's thesis Foundations for an Interpretation of Rubén Darío, presented to his alma mater, the National University of San Marcos, in 1958

Mario Vargas Llosa was born to a middle-class family on 28 March 1936, in the southern Peruvian provincial city of Arequipa. He was the only child of Ernesto Vargas Maldonado and Dora Llosa Ureta (the former a radio operator in an aviation company, the latter the daughter of an old criollo family), who separated a few months before his birth. Shortly after Mario's birth, his father revealed that he was in a relationship with a German woman, from which Mario's two younger half-brothers—Enrique and Ernesto Vargas—were born.

Vargas Llosa lived with his maternal family in Arequipa until a year after his parents divorced, when his maternal grandfather was named honorary consul for Peru in Bolivia. With his mother and her family, Vargas Llosa then moved to Cochabamba, Bolivia, where he spent the early years of his childhood. His maternal family, the Llosas, were sustained by his grandfather, who managed a cotton farm. As a child, Vargas Llosa was led to believe that his father had died—his mother and her family did not want to explain that his parents had separated. During the government of President José Bustamante y Rivero, Vargas Llosa's maternal grandfather, who was a cousin of Bustamante y Rivero, obtained a diplomatic post in the northern Peruvian coastal city of Piura and the entire family returned to Peru. While in Piura, Vargas Llosa attended elementary school at the Colegio Salesiano religious academy. In 1946, at the age of ten, he moved to Lima and met his father for the first time. His parents re-established their relationship and lived in Magdalena del Mar, a middle-class Lima suburb, during his teenage years. While in Lima, he studied at the Colegio La Salle, a Catholic middle school, from 1947 to 1949.

When Vargas Llosa was fourteen, his father sent him to the Leoncio Prado Military Academy in Callao. At the age of 16, before his graduation, Vargas Llosa began working as a journalist for local newspapers. He withdrew from the military academy and finished his studies in Piura, where he worked for the local newspaper, La Industria, and witnessed the theatrical performance of his first dramatic work, La huida del Inca.

In 1953, during the government of Manuel A. Odría, Vargas Llosa enrolled in Lima's National University of San Marcos, to study law and literature. While at the university, he was a member of a communist group, embracing the ideology as a reaction to the corruption and inequality endemic to Latin America. He married Julia Urquidi, his maternal uncle's sister-in-law, in 1955 at the age of 19; she was 10 years older. Vargas Llosa began his literary career in earnest, in 1957, with the publication of his first short stories, "The Leaders" ("Los jefes") and "The Grandfather" ("El abuelo"), while working for two Peruvian newspapers. Upon his graduation from the National University of San Marcos in 1958, he received a scholarship to study at the Complutense University of Madrid in Spain.

In 1960, after his scholarship in Madrid had expired, Vargas Llosa moved to France, under the impression that he would receive a scholarship to study there. However, upon arriving in Paris, he learned that his scholarship request had been denied. Despite Mario and Julia's unexpected financial status, the couple decided to remain in Paris, where he began to write prolifically, including as a ghostwriter. Their marriage lasted only a few more years before ending in divorce in 1964. A year later, Vargas Llosa married his first cousin, Patricia Llosa, with whom he had three children: Álvaro (born 1966), a writer and editor; Gonzalo (born 1967), an international civil servant; and Morgana (born 1974), a photographer.

== Writing career ==
=== Beginning and first major works ===
Vargas Llosa's first novel, The Time of the Hero (La ciudad y los perros), was published in 1963. The book is set among a community of cadets in a Lima military school, and the plot is based on the author's own experiences at Lima's Leoncio Prado Military Academy. This early piece gained wide public attention and immediate success. Its vitality and adept use of sophisticated literary techniques immediately impressed critics, and it won the Premio de la Crítica Española award. Nevertheless, its sharp criticism of the Peruvian military establishment led to controversy in Peru: several generals attacked the novel, claiming that it was the work of a "degenerate mind" and stating that Vargas Llosa was "paid by Ecuador" to undermine the prestige of the Peruvian Army.

In 1965, Vargas Llosa published his second novel, The Green House (La casa verde), about a brothel called "The Green House" and how its quasi-mythical presence affects the lives of the characters. The main plot follows Bonifacia, a girl who is about to receive the vows of the church and her transformation into la Selvática, the Green House's best-known prostitute. The novel was immediately acclaimed, confirming Vargas Llosa as an important voice of Latin American narrative. The Green House won the first edition of the Rómulo Gallegos International Novel Prize in 1967, contending with works by veteran Uruguayan writer Juan Carlos Onetti and by Gabriel García Márquez. This novel, alone, accumulated enough awards to place the author among the leading figures of the Latin American Boom. Some critics still consider The Green House to be Vargas Llosa's finest and most important achievement. Indeed, Latin Americanist literary critic Gerald Martin suggests that The Green House is "one of the greatest novels to have emerged from Latin America".

In 1967, Vargas Llosa published Los cachorros, a short novel centered on Cuéllar, a boy marked by a brutal school accident. In an essay, writer Gunter Silva Passuni highlighted the work’s treatment of adolescence, exclusion, and "virilidad mutilada," as well as its use of a collective voice and shifting verb tenses.

Vargas Llosa's third novel, Conversation in The Cathedral (Conversación en La Catedral), was published in 1969, when he was 33. This ambitious narrative is the story of Santiago Zavala, the son of a government minister, and Ambrosio, his chauffeur. A random meeting at a dog pound leads the pair to a riveting conversation at a nearby bar known as "The Cathedral". During the encounter, Zavala searches for the truth about his father's role in the murder of a notorious Peruvian underworld figure, shedding light on the workings of a dictatorship along the way. Unfortunately for Zavala, his quest results in a dead end with no answers and no sign of a better future. The novel attacks the dictatorial government of Odría by showing how a dictatorship controls and destroys lives. The persistent theme of hopelessness makes Conversation in The Cathedral Vargas Llosa's most bitter novel.

Vargas Llosa lectured on Spanish American Literature at King's College London from 1969 to 1970.

=== 1970s and the "discovery of humor" ===
In 1971, Vargas Llosa published García Márquez: Story of a Deicide (García Márquez: historia de un deicidio), which was his doctoral thesis for the Complutense University of Madrid. Although Vargas Llosa wrote this book-length study about his then friend, the Colombian Nobel laureate writer Gabriel García Márquez, they did not speak to each other again. In 1976, Vargas Llosa punched García Márquez in the face at the Palacio de Bellas Artes in Mexico City, ending the friendship. Neither writer publicly stated the underlying reasons for the quarrel. According to Guillermo Angulo, a mutual friend of García Marquez and Vargas Llosa, the punch happened because Vargas Llosa had left his wife in Spain for a "very beautiful woman." After that fledgling romance faltered, Vargas Llosa returned to his wife, who then told Vargas Llosa that García Marquez had tried to gain her affections during the time he had left her. A photograph of García Márquez sporting a black eye was published in 2007, reigniting public interest in the feud. Despite the decades of silence, in 2007, Vargas Llosa agreed to allow part of his book to be used as the introduction to a 40th-anniversary edition of García Márquez's One Hundred Years of Solitude, which was re-released in Spain and throughout Latin America that year. Historia de un Deicidio was also reissued in that year, as part of Vargas Llosa's complete works.

Following the monumental work Conversation in The Cathedral, Vargas Llosa's output shifted away from more serious themes such as politics and problems with society. Raymond L. Williams, a scholar of Latin American literature, describes this phase in his writing career as "the discovery of humor". His first attempt at a satirical novel was Captain Pantoja and the Special Service (Pantaleón y las visitadoras), published in 1973. This short, comic novel offers vignettes of dialogues and documents about the Peruvian armed forces and a corps of prostitutes assigned to visit military outposts in remote jungle areas. These plot elements are similar to Vargas Llosa's earlier novel The Green House, but in a different form. Captain Pantoja and the Special Service is, therefore, essentially a parody of both The Green House and the literary approach that novel represents. Vargas Llosa's motivation to write the novel came from actually witnessing prostitutes being hired by the Peruvian Army and brought to serve soldiers in the jungle.

From 1974 to 1987, Vargas Llosa focused on his writing, but also took the time to pursue other endeavours. In 1975, he co-directed an unsuccessful motion-picture adaptation of his novel, Captain Pantoja and the Secret Service. In 1976 he was elected President of PEN International, the worldwide association of writers and oldest human rights organization, a position he held until 1979. During this time, Vargas Llosa frequently travelled to speak at conferences organized by international institutions such as the Hebrew University of Jerusalem and the University of Cambridge, where he was Simón Bolívar Professor and an Overseas Fellow of Churchill College in 1977–78.

In 1977, Vargas Llosa was elected as a member of the Peruvian Academy of Language. That year, he also published Aunt Julia and the Scriptwriter (La tía Julia y el escribidor), based in part on his marriage to his first wife, Julia Urquidi, to whom he dedicated the novel. She later wrote a memoir, Lo que Varguitas no dijo (What Little Vargas Didn't Say), in which she gives her personal account of their relationship. She states that Vargas Llosa's account exaggerates many negative points in their courtship and marriage while minimizing her role of assisting his literary career. Aunt Julia and the Scriptwriter is considered one of the most striking examples of how the language and imagery of popular culture can be used in literature. The novel was adapted in 1990 into a Hollywood feature film, Tune in Tomorrow.

=== Later novels ===
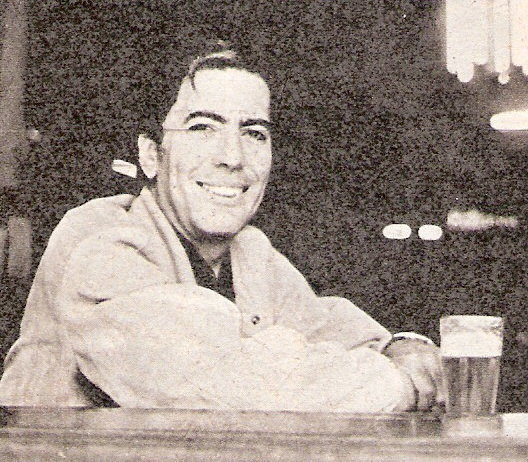
Vargas Llosa in 1982

Vargas Llosa's fourth major novel, The War of the End of the World (La guerra del fin del mundo), was published in 1981 and was his first attempt at a historical novel. This work initiated a radical change in Vargas Llosa's style towards themes such as messianism and irrational human behaviour. It recreates the War of Canudos, an incident in 19th-century Brazil in which an armed millenarian cult held off a siege by the national army for months. As in Vargas Llosa's earliest work, this novel carries a sober and serious theme, and its tone is dark. Vargas Llosa's bold exploration of humanity's propensity to idealize violence, and his account of a man-made catastrophe brought on by fanaticism on all sides, earned the novel substantial recognition. Because of the book's ambition and execution, critics have argued that this is one of Vargas Llosa's greatest literary pieces. Even though the novel has been acclaimed in Brazil, it was initially poorly received because a foreigner was writing about a Brazilian topic. The book was also criticized as revolutionary and anti-socialist. Vargas Llosa said that this book was his favourite and was his most difficult accomplishment.

After completing The War of the End of the World, Vargas Llosa began to write novels that were significantly shorter than many of his earlier books. In 1983, he finished The Real Life of Alejandro Mayta (Historia de Mayta, 1984). The novel focuses on a leftist insurrection that took place on 29 May 1962, in the Andean city of Jauja. Later the same year, during the Sendero Luminoso uprising, Vargas Llosa was asked by President Fernando Belaúnde Terry to join the Investigatory Commission, a task force to inquire into the massacre of eight journalists at the hands of the villagers of Uchuraccay. The commission's main purpose was to investigate the murders to provide information regarding the incident to the public. Following his involvement with the Investigatory Commission, Vargas Llosa published a series of articles to defend his position in the affair. In 1986, he completed his next novel, Who Killed Palomino Molero? (¿Quién mató a Palomino Molero?), which he began writing shortly after the end of the Uchuraccay investigation. Though the plot of this mystery novel is similar to the tragic events at Uchuraccay, literary critic Roy Boland points out that it was not an attempt to reconstruct the murders, but rather a "literary exorcism" of Vargas Llosa's own experiences on the commission. The experience also inspired one of Vargas Llosa's later novels, Death in the Andes (Lituma en los Andes), originally published in 1993 in Barcelona. In the spring of 1988, Vargas Llosa served as the Jeanette K. Watson Distinguished Visiting Professor at Syracuse University, where he wrote A Writer’s Reality La verdad de las mentiras: ensayos sobre la novela moderna which was published in 1991 with an introduction by Myron Lichtblau.

It was almost 20 years before Vargas Llosa wrote another major work: The Feast of the Goat (La fiesta del chivo), a political thriller, was published in 2000 (and in English in 2001). According to Williams, it is Vargas Llosa's most complete and most ambitious novel since The War of the End of the World. Critic Sabine Koellmann sees it in the line of his earlier novels such as Conversation in The Cathedral depicting the effects of authoritarianism, violence and the abuse of power on the individual. Based on the dictatorship of Rafael Trujillo, who governed the Dominican Republic from 1930 until his assassination in 1961, the novel has three main strands: one concerns Urania Cabral, the daughter of a former politician and Trujillo loyalist, who returns for the first time since leaving the Dominican Republic after Trujillo's assassination 30 years earlier; the second concentrates on the assassination itself, the conspirators who carry it out, and its consequences; and the third and final strand deals with Trujillo himself in scenes from the end of his regime. The book quickly received positive reviews in Spain and Latin America and is regarded as one of Vargas Llosa's best works.

In 2003, he wrote The Way to Paradise in which he studies Flora Tristan and Paul Gauguin. In 2006, Vargas Llosa wrote The Bad Girl (Travesuras de la niña mala), which journalist Kathryn Harrison argues is a rewrite (rather than simply a recycling) of Gustave Flaubert's Madame Bovary (1856). In Vargas Llosa's version, the plot relates the decades-long obsession of its narrator, a Peruvian expatriate in Paris, with a woman with whom he first fell in love when both were teenagers. In 2019 he published the novel Harsh Times (Tiempos recios), about the 1954 coup in Guatemala. In 2023, Vargas Llosa announced that he would publish his final novel, Le dedico mi silencio (I Give You My Silence), and retire.

== Political career ==
=== Turn to liberalism ===
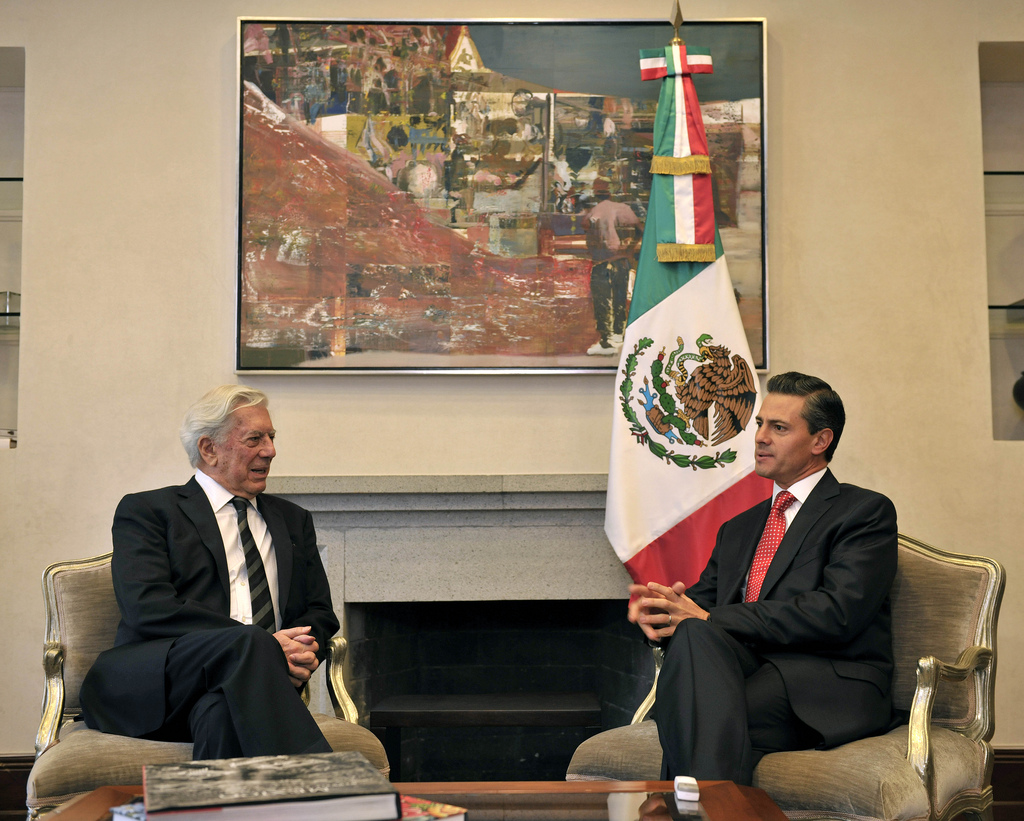
Mario Vargas Llosa with Mexican president Enrique Peña Nieto in 2014

Like many other Latin American intellectuals, Vargas Llosa was initially a supporter of the Cuban revolutionary government of Fidel Castro. He studied Marxism in depth as a university student and was later persuaded by communist ideals after the success of the Cuban Revolution. Gradually, Vargas Llosa came to believe that socialism was incompatible with what he considered to be general liberties and freedoms. The official rupture between the writer and the policies of the Cuban government occurred with the "Padilla Affair", when the Castro regime imprisoned the poet Heberto Padilla for a month in 1971. Vargas Llosa, along with other intellectuals of the time, wrote to Castro protesting the Cuban political system and its imprisonment of the poet. Vargas Llosa identified himself with liberalism rather than extreme left-wing political ideologies thereafter. After he relinquished his earlier leftism, he opposed both left- and right-wing authoritarian regimes.

=== Investigatory Commission ===
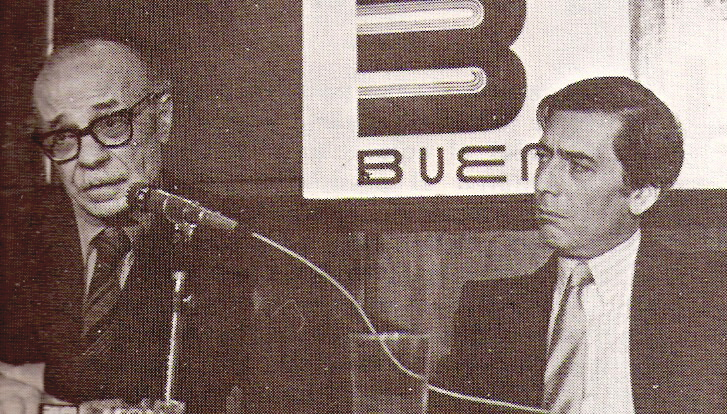
Argentine writer Ernesto Sabato (left) with Mario Vargas Llosa (right) in 1981

With his appointment to the Investigatory Commission on the Uchuraccay massacre in 1983, he experienced what literary critic Jean Franco calls "the most uncomfortable event in [his] political career". Unfortunately for Vargas Llosa, his involvement with the Investigatory Commission led to immediate negative reactions and defamation from the Peruvian press; many suggested that the massacre was a conspiracy to keep the journalists from reporting the presence of government paramilitary forces in Uchuraccay. The commission concluded that it was the indigenous villagers who had been responsible for the killings; for Vargas Llosa the incident showed "how vulnerable democracy is in Latin America and how easily it dies under dictatorships of the right and left". These conclusions, and Vargas Llosa personally, came under intense criticism: anthropologist Enrique Mayer, for instance, accused him of "paternalism", while fellow anthropologist Carlos Iván Degregori criticized him for his ignorance of the Andean world. Vargas Llosa was accused of actively colluding in a government cover-up of army involvement in the massacre. American Latin American literature scholar Misha Kokotovic summarizes that the novelist was charged with seeing "indigenous cultures as a 'primitive' obstacle to the full realization of his Western model of modernity". Shocked both by the atrocity itself and then by the reaction his report had provoked, Vargas Llosa responded that his critics were apparently more concerned with his report than with the hundreds of peasants who later died at the hands of the Sendero Luminoso guerrilla organization.

=== Presidential candidacy ===
In 1987, he helped form and soon became a leader of the centre-right party Movimiento Libertad. The following year his party entered a coalition with the parties of Peru's two principal conservative politicians at the time, ex-president Fernando Belaúnde Terry (of the Popular Action party) and Luis Bedoya Reyes (of the Popular Christian Party), to form the tripartite centre-right coalition known as Frente Democrático (FREDEMO). He ran for the presidency of Peru in 1990 as the candidate of the FREDEMO coalition with the support of the United States. Many of Peru's political elite in the 21st century began their careers in FREDEMO. He proposed neoliberal policies—similar to those later adopted by Alberto Fujimori—that included a drastic economic austerity program that frightened most of the country's poor; this program emphasized the need for privatization, a market economy, free trade, and most importantly, the dissemination of private property.

Vargas Llosa, according to Rospigliosi, inspired some of the objectives drafted by the Peruvian Armed Forces in the Plan Verde, specifically in the volume titled Driving Peru into the XXI century, which outlined Peru becoming a neoliberal country and called for the extermination of vulnerable populations deemed as economically burdensome. Members of the Peruvian Armed Forces who drafted the Plan Verde initially expected Vargas Llosa to win the presidency and support their objectives. Although Vargas Llosa won the first round with 34% of the vote, he was defeated by a then-unknown agricultural engineer, Alberto Fujimori, in the subsequent run-off. Vargas Llosa included an account of his run for the presidency in the memoir A Fish in the Water (El pez en el agua, 1993).

== Later life ==
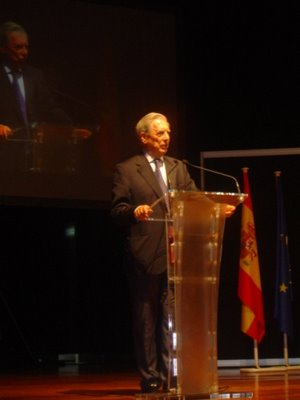
Vargas Llosa at the founding act of the Spanish political party UPyD in September 2007

Vargas Llosa mainly lived in Madrid from the 1990s onwards, but spent roughly three months of the year in Peru with his extended family. He also frequently visited London where he occasionally spent long periods. Vargas Llosa acquired Spanish citizenship in 1993, though he still held Peruvian nationality. The writer often reiterated his love for both countries. In his Nobel prize acceptance speech he observed: "I carry Peru deep inside me because that is where I was born, grew up, was formed, and lived those experiences of childhood and youth that shaped my personality and forged my calling." He then added: "I love Spain as much as Peru, and my debt to her is as great as my gratitude. If not for Spain, I never would have reached this podium or become a known writer." Vargas Llosa accepted Dominican nationality in 2023.

Mario Vargas Llosa served as a visiting professor of Latin American studies at Harvard University during the 1992–1993 academic year. Harvard later recognized Vargas Llosa by conferring upon him an honorary Doctor of Letters degree in 1999. In 1994 he was elected a member of the Real Academia Española (Royal Spanish Academy) and took up its L seat on 15 January 1996. Vargas Llosa joined the Mont Pelerin Society in 2014. He was also a member of Washington, D.C.–based think tank, the Inter-American Dialogue.

=== Panama and Pandora Papers ===
Vargas Llosa was named in both the Panama Papers (2016) and Pandora Papers (2021) released by the International Consortium of Investigative Journalists. According to IDL-Reporteros, the British Virgin Islands company Melek Investing Inc. was documented to be owned by Vargas Llosa, and was used for book royalty profits and the sale of real estate in London and Madrid. Following the Panama Papers leak in 2016, Carmen Balcells said on behalf of Vargas Llosa that investments were made "without the consent of Messrs. Vargas Llosa", while in the 2021 Pandora Papers leaks, Javier Martín, a representative of Vargas Llosa, said the writer "was not aware of the ownership of that company". IDL-Reporteros provided a document showing Vargas Llosa's signature on a "Consent to Act as Director" form for Melek Investing Inc. as part of the 2021 leak.

== Style of writing ==
=== Plot, setting, and major themes ===
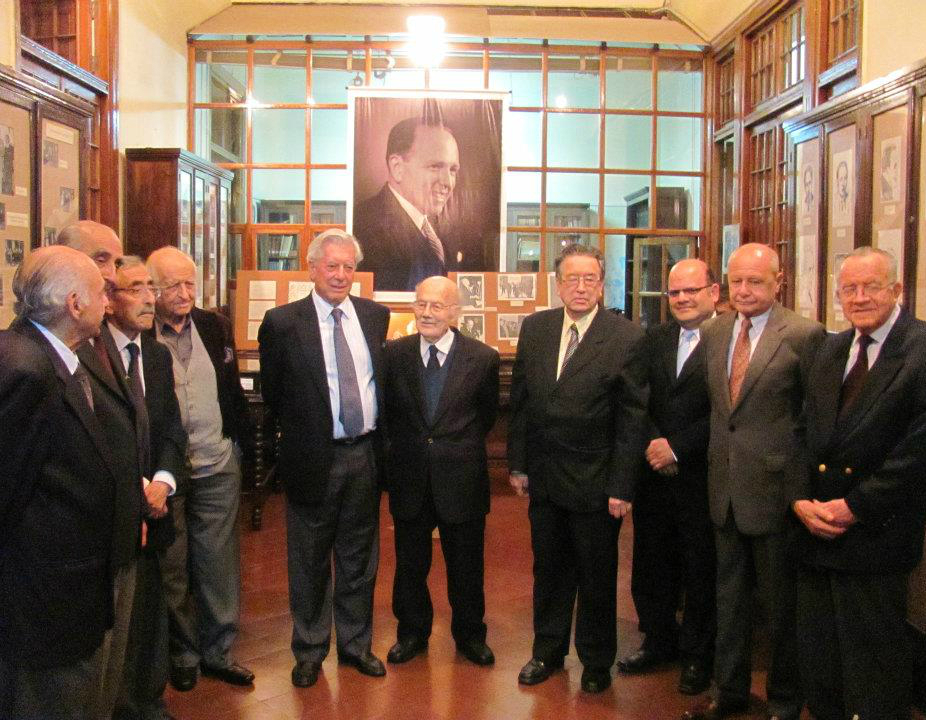
Vargas Llosa (fifth from the left), accompanied by several Peruvian intellectuals and members of the Peruvian Academy of Language, during his visit to the Raúl Porras Barrenechea Institute of the National University of San Marcos in 2011

Vargas Llosa's style encompasses historical material as well as his own experiences. For example, in his first novel, The Time of the Hero, his own experiences at the Leoncio Prado military school informed his depiction of the corrupt social institution which mocked the moral standards it was supposed to uphold. Furthermore, the corruption of the book's school is a reflection of the corruption of Peruvian society at the time the novel was written. Vargas Llosa frequently used his writing to challenge the inadequacies of society, such as demoralization and oppression by those in political power towards those who challenge this power. One of the main themes he explored in his writing is the individual's struggle for freedom within an oppressive reality. For example, his two-volume novel Conversation in The Cathedral is based on the tyrannical dictatorship of President Manuel A. Odría. The protagonist, Santiago, rebels against the suffocating dictatorship by participating in the subversive activities of leftist political groups. In addition to themes such as corruption and oppression, Vargas Llosa's second novel, The Green House, explores "a denunciation of Peru's basic institutions", dealing with issues of abuse and exploitation of the workers in the brothel by corrupt military officers.

Many of Vargas Llosa's earlier novels were set in Peru, while in later work he expanded to other regions of Latin America, such as Brazil and the Dominican Republic. His responsibilities as a writer and lecturer allowed him to travel frequently and led to settings for his novels in regions outside of Peru. The War of the End of the World was his first major work set outside Peru. Though the plot deals with historical events of the Canudos revolt against the Brazilian government, the novel is not based directly on historical fact; rather, its main inspiration is the non-fiction account of those events published by Brazilian writer Euclides da Cunha in 1902. The Feast of the Goat, based on the dictatorship of Rafael Trujillo, takes place in the Dominican Republic; in preparation for this novel, Vargas Llosa undertook a comprehensive study of Dominican history. The novel was characteristically realist, and Vargas Llosa underscored that he "respected the basic facts, ... I have not exaggerated", but at the same time he pointed out "It's a novel, not a history book, so I took many, many liberties."

One of Vargas Llosa's later novels, The Way to Paradise (El paraíso en la otra esquina), is set largely in Tahiti in French Polynesia. Based on the biography of social reformer Flora Tristan, it demonstrates how Flora and Paul Gauguin were unable to find paradise, but were still able to inspire followers to keep working towards a socialist utopia. Unfortunately, Vargas Llosa was not as successful in transforming these historical figures into fiction. Some critics, such as Bárbara Mujica, argue that The Way to Paradise lacks the "audacity, energy, political vision, and narrative genius" that was present in his previous works.

=== Modernism and postmodernism ===
The works of Mario Vargas Llosa are viewed as both modernist and postmodernist novels. Though there is still much debate over the differences between modernist and postmodernist literature, literary scholar M. Keith Booker claims that the difficulty and technical complexity of Vargas Llosa's early works, such as The Green House and Conversation in The Cathedral, are elements of the modern novel. Furthermore, these earlier novels all carry a certain seriousness of attitude—another important defining aspect of modernist art. By contrast, his later novels such as Captain Pantoja and the Special Service, Aunt Julia and the Scriptwriter, The Real Life of Alejandro Mayta, and The Storyteller (El hablador) appear to follow a postmodernist mode of writing. These novels have a much lighter, farcical, and comic tone, characteristics of postmodernism. Comparing two of Vargas Llosa's novels, The Green House and Captain Pantoja and the Special Service, Booker discusses the contrast between modernism and postmodernism found in the writer's works: while both novels explore the theme of prostitution as well as the workings of the Peruvian military, Booker points out that the former is gravely serious whereas the latter is ridiculously comic.

=== Interlacing dialogues ===
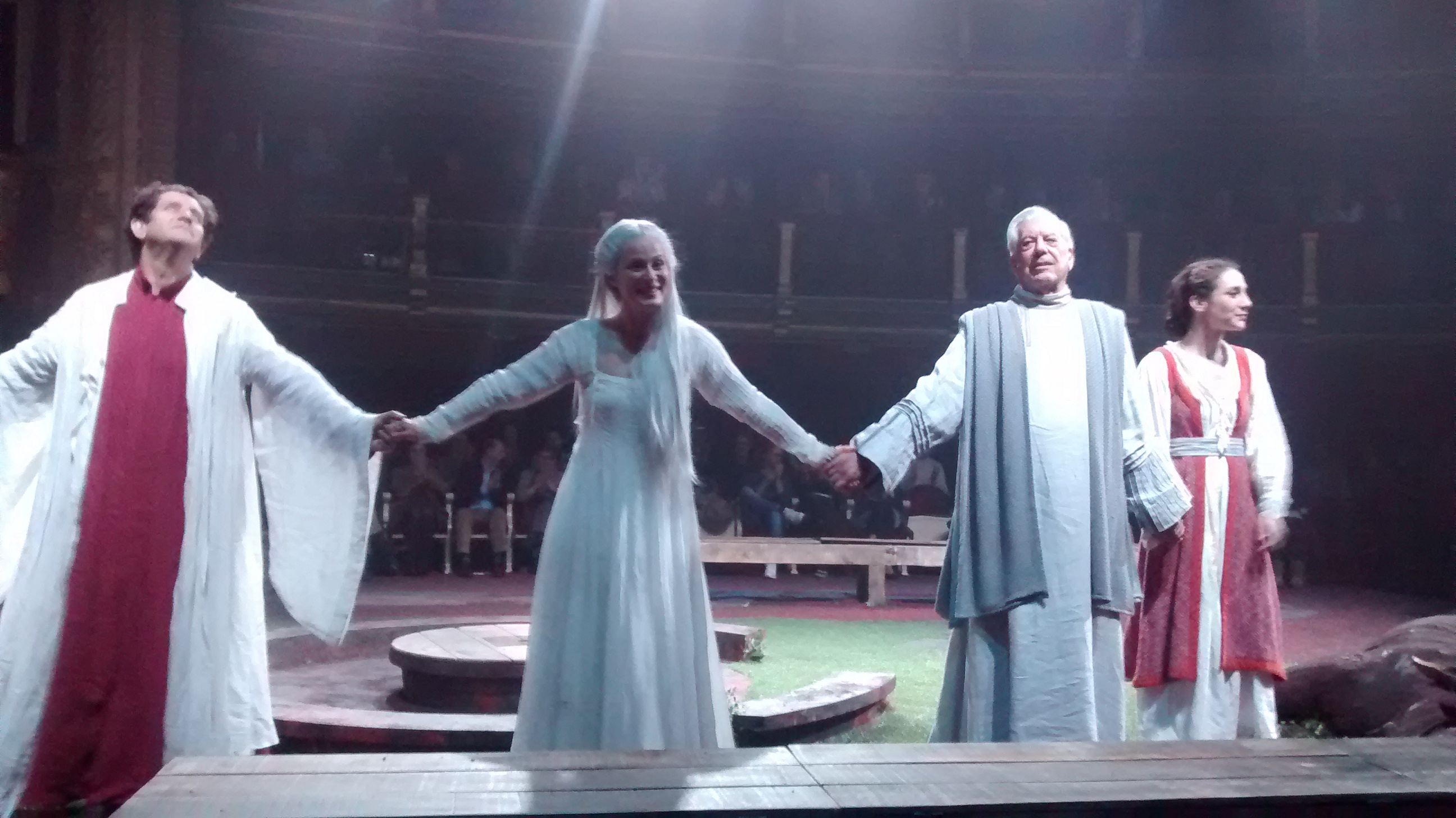
Vargas Llosa acting in his play Los cuentos de la peste in Teatro Español, 2015

Literary scholar M. Keith Booker argues that Vargas Llosa perfects the technique of interlacing dialogues in his novel The Green House. By combining two conversations that occur at different times, he creates the illusion of a flashback. Vargas Llosa also sometimes used this technique as a means of shifting location by weaving together two concurrent conversations happening in different places.

This technique is a staple of his repertoire, which he began using near the end of his first novel, The Time of the Hero. However, he did not use interlacing dialogues in the same way in all of his novels. For example, in The Green House the technique is used in a serious fashion to achieve a sober tone and to focus on the interrelatedness of important events separated in time or space. In contrast, Captain Pantoja and the Special Service employs this strategy for comic effects and uses simpler spatial shifts. This device is similar to both Virginia Woolf's mixing of different characters' soliloquies and Gustave Flaubert's counterpoint technique in which he blends conversation with other events, such as speeches. This was seen to occur yet again in Vargas Llosa's penultimate novel, Tiempos recios, as two dialogues, one between Trujillo and Castillo Armas, and another between Trujillo and Abbes García, are juxtaposed.

=== Literary influences ===
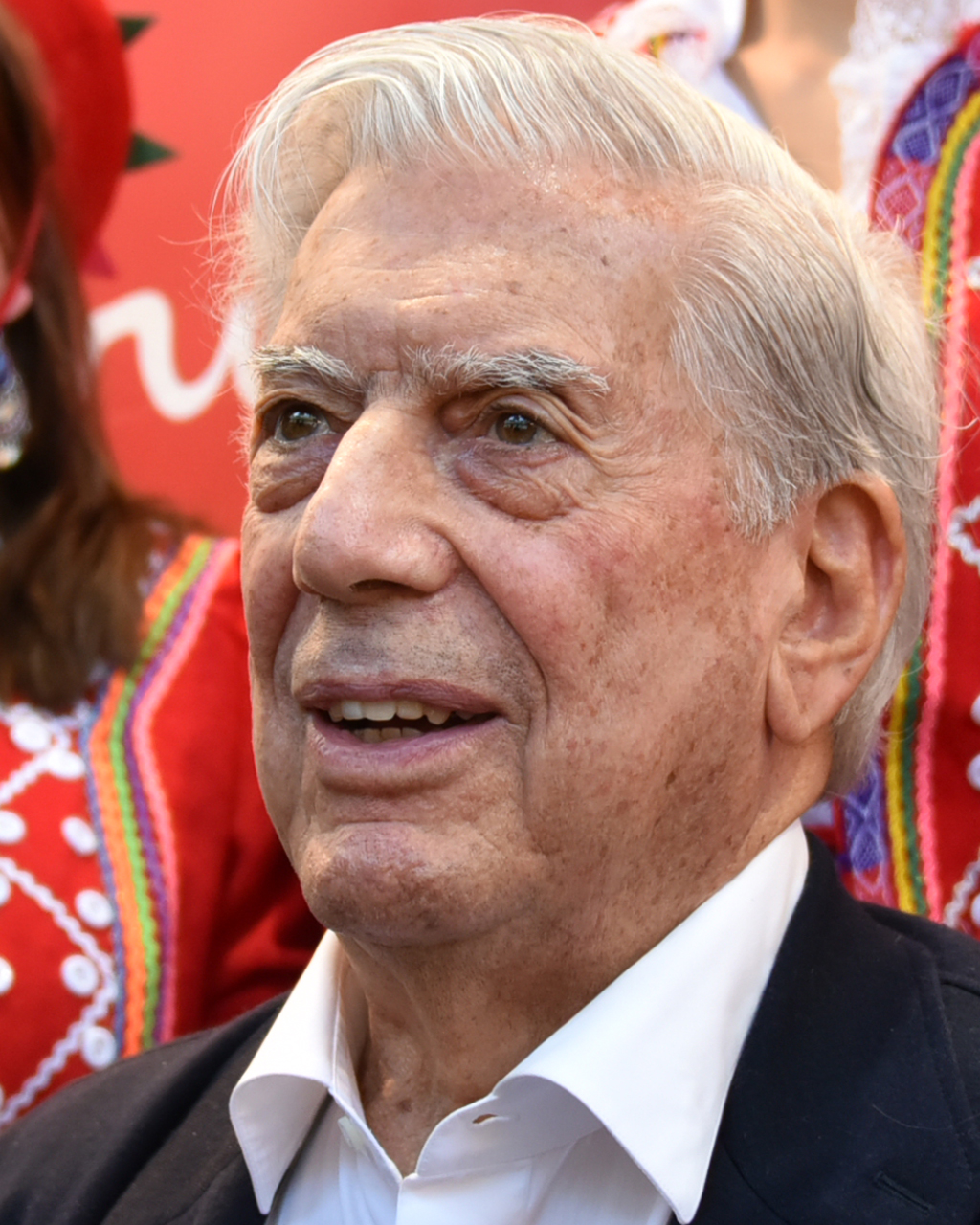
Vargas Llosa in 2019

Vargas Llosa's first literary influences were relatively obscure Peruvian writers such as Martín Adán, Carlos Oquendo de Amat, and César Moro. As a young writer, he looked to these revolutionary novelists in search of new narrative structures and techniques to delineate a more contemporary, multifaceted experience of urban Peru. He was looking for a style different from the traditional descriptions of land and rural life made famous by Peru's foremost novelist at the time, José María Arguedas. Vargas Llosa wrote of Arguedas's work that it was "an example of old-fashioned regionalism that had already exhausted its imaginary possibilities". Although he did not share Arguedas's passion for indigenous reality, Vargas Llosa admired and respected the novelist for his contributions to Peruvian literature. Indeed, he published a book-length study on his work, La utopía arcaica (1996).

Rather than restrict himself to Peruvian literature, Vargas Llosa also looked abroad for literary inspiration. Two French figures, existentialist Jean-Paul Sartre and novelist Gustave Flaubert, influenced both his technique and style. Sartre's influence is most prevalent in Vargas Llosa's extensive use of conversation. The epigraph of The Time of the Hero, his first novel, is also taken directly from Sartre's work. Flaubert's artistic independence—his novels' disregard of reality and morals— was always admired by Vargas Llosa, who wrote a book-length study of Flaubert's aesthetics, The Perpetual Orgy. In his analysis of Flaubert, Vargas Llosa questioned the revolutionary power of literature in a political setting; this is in contrast to his earlier view that "literature is an act of rebellion", thus marking a transition in Vargas Llosa's aesthetic beliefs. Other critics such as Sabine Köllmann argue that his belief in the transforming power of literature is one of the great continuities that characterize his fictional and non-fictional work, and link his early statement that 'Literature is Fire' with his Nobel Prize Speech 'In Praise of Reading and Writing'.

One of Vargas Llosa's favourite novelists, and arguably the most influential on his writing career, was the American William Faulkner. Vargas Llosa considered Faulkner "the writer who perfected the methods of the modern novel". Both writers' styles include intricate changes in time and narration. In The Time of the Hero, for example, aspects of Vargas Llosa's plot, his main character's development and his use of narrative time are influenced by his favourite Faulkner novel, Light in August.

In addition to the studies of Arguedas and Flaubert, Vargas Llosa wrote literary criticisms of other authors that he admired, such as Gabriel García Márquez, Albert Camus, Ernest Hemingway, and Jean-Paul Sartre. The main goals of his non-fiction works are to acknowledge the influence of these authors on his writing, and to recognize a connection between himself and the other writers; critic Sara Castro-Klarén argues that he offers little systematic analysis of these authors' literary techniques. In The Perpetual Orgy, for example, he discusses the relationship between his own aesthetics and Flaubert's, rather than focusing on Flaubert's alone.

== Political views ==
After distancing himself from left-wing politics, he embraced right-wing politics. In 1989, The Washington Post wrote that though Vargas Llosa's party appeared centre-right, "he has ties with far-right politicians in other countries". The Christian Science Monitor called Vargas Llosa "a right-wing maverick" while the socialist magazine Jacobin described him as a "far-right novelist".

Vargas Llosa described himself as a supporter of liberalism and said that the individuals who have had most impact on his political thought have included Karl Popper, Friedrich Hayek, and Isaiah Berlin. According to The Nation, Vargas Llosa would condemn leftist groups entirely due to the controversies of some while minimizing similar actions by neoliberal governments. Vargas Llosa was also one of the 25 leading figures on the Information and Democracy Commission launched in 2018 by Reporters Without Borders. He supported right-wing libertarian candidate Javier Milei in the 2023 Argentine general election.

=== Chile ===
Following the arrest of Augusto Pinochet for crimes against humanity in 1999, Vargas Llosa wrote an op-ed in The New York Times asking why left-wing dictators were not also being arrested. During the 2021 Chilean general election, Vargas Llosa expressed support for conservative presidential candidate José Antonio Kast.

=== Brazil ===
During the 2022 Brazilian general election, Vargas Llosa expressed his endorsement for Brazilian president Jair Bolsonaro. "The case of Bolsonaro it's a hard question. His jokes are very hard to endorse, for a liberal [...] Now, between Bolsonaro and Lula, I prefer Bolsonaro. Even with jokes from Bolsonaro, Lula no", said Vargas Llosa at a conference.

=== Mexico ===
A month after losing the 1990 election, at the invitation of Octavio Paz, Vargas Llosa attended a conference in Mexico entitled "The 20th Century: The Experience of Freedom". Focused on the collapse of communist rule in central and eastern Europe, it was broadcast on Mexican television from 27 August to 2 September. Addressing the conference on 30 August 1990, Vargas Llosa embarrassed his hosts by condemning the Mexican system of power based on the rule of the Institutional Revolutionary Party (PRI), which had been in power for 61 years. Criticizing the PRI by name, he commented, "I don't believe that there has been in Latin America any case of a system of dictatorship that has so efficiently recruited the intellectual milieu, bribing it with great subtlety." He declared, "Mexico is the perfect dictatorship. The perfect dictatorship is not communism, not the USSR, not Fidel Castro; the perfect dictatorship is Mexico. Because it is a camouflaged dictatorship." The statement "Mexico is the perfect dictatorship" became a cliché in Mexico and internationally, until the PRI lost power in 2000.

=== Peru ===
In April 2011, during the 2011 general election, Vargas Llosa said he was going to vote for Alejandro Toledo (who had already served as president from 2001 to 2006). After casting his vote, he said his country should stay in the path of legality and freedom.

After her introduction into politics, Vargas Llosa had a complex opinion on conservative politician Keiko Fujimori, daughter of president of Peru Alberto Fujimori. During her candidacy in the 2011 general election, Vargas Llosa said "the worst option is that of Keiko Fujimori because it means the legitimation of one of the worst dictatorships that Peru has had in its history", endorsing and calling for Peruvian voters to consider left-wing candidate Ollanta Humala over Fujimori in the second-round ballot. After Fujimori announced her candidacy for the 2016 general election, Vargas Llosa said in 2014, "Keiko is the daughter of a murderer and a thief who is imprisoned, tried by civil courts with international observers, sentenced to 25 years in prison for murder and theft. I do not want her to win the elections." However, in the second round of the 2021 general election, Vargas Llosa expressed support for Keiko, sharing opposition to far-left candidate Pedro Castillo and describing Fujimori as the "lesser of two evils".

=== Spain ===
In February 2008 he ended his support for the People's Party in favour of the recently created Union, Progress and Democracy, claiming that certain conservative views held by the former party are at odds with his classical liberal beliefs. His political ideologies appear in the book Política razonable, written with Fernando Savater, Rosa Díez, Álvaro Pombo, Albert Boadella, and Carlos Martínez Gorriarán. He continued to write, both journalism and fiction, and to travel extensively. He also taught as a visiting professor at a number of prominent universities.

Vargas Llosa was opposed to Catalan independence from Spain. Attending an anti-independence rally in October 2017 in Barcelona, he said: "Spanish democracy is here to stay. No separatist conspiracy can destroy it." In 2021, he attended a rally against the pardon of the Catalan independence leaders in Madrid.

== Later personal life ==
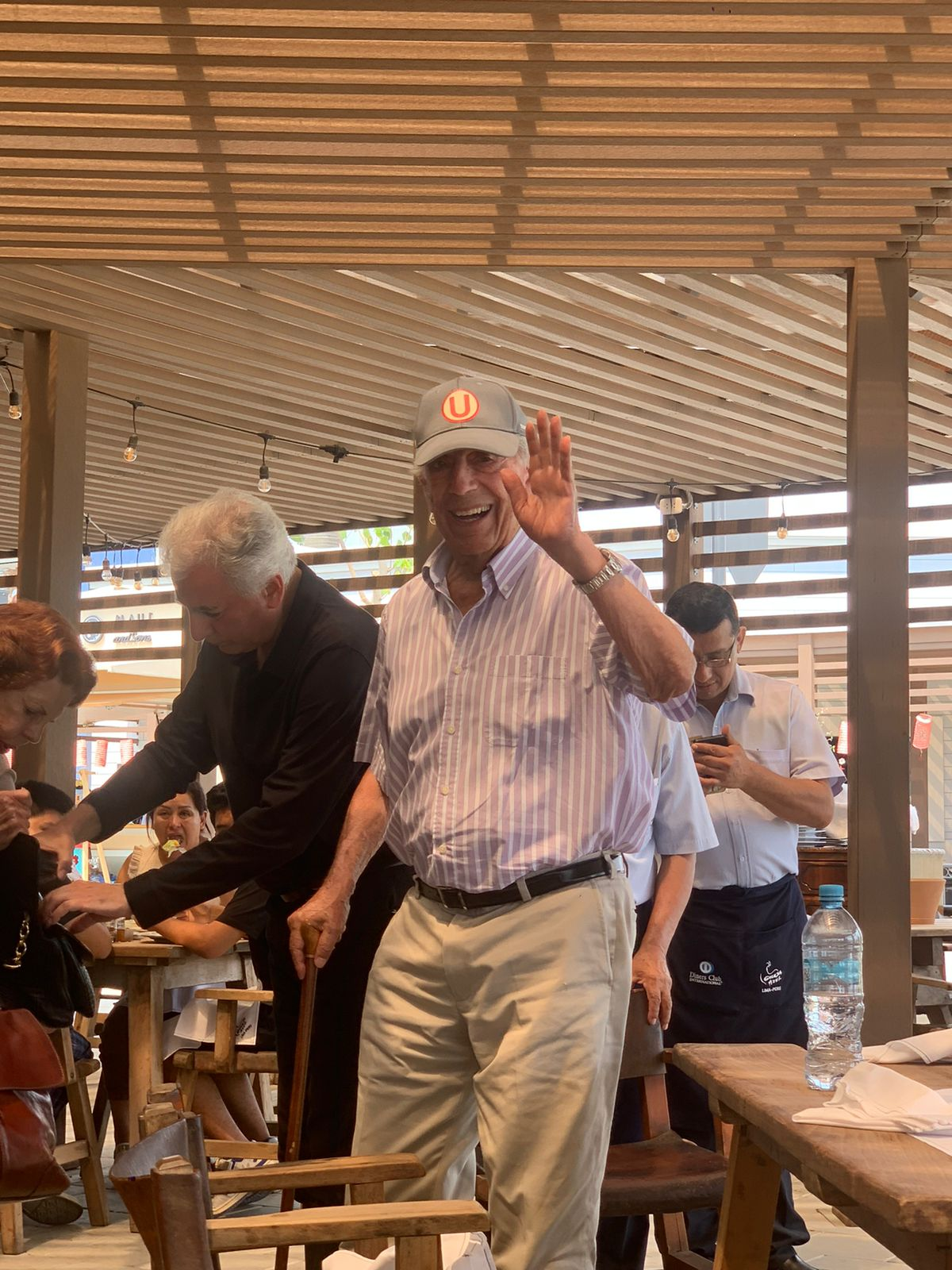
Vargas Llosa wearing a cap from Club Universitario de Deportes, the Peruvian soccer team he supported as a youth

Vargas Llosa was an agnostic, "I was not a believer, nor was I an atheist either, but, rather, an agnostic".

Vargas Llosa declared himself a music lover and stated that he felt a special fondness for Gustav Mahler. He was fond of association football and was a supporter of Universitario de Deportes. In his book A Fish in the Water he confessed that from childhood he was a fan of the 'cream coloured' team from Peru, which he first saw play one day in 1946 when he was only 10 years old. In February 2011, Vargas Llosa was awarded an honorary life membership of this football club, in a ceremony that took place at Lima's Monumental Stadium.

In 2015, Vargas Llosa embarked on a relationship with Filipina Spanish socialite and TV personality Isabel Preysler and separated from his second wife Patricia Llosa. In December 2022, it was announced that Vargas Llosa and Preysler had split up.

In April 2022, he was infected with COVID-19 and hospitalized.

== Death ==
Vargas Llosa died in Lima on 13 April 2025, at the age of 89. He was surrounded by his family and "at peace", his son Álvaro Vargas Llosa said on his X account. It was also announced that his remains were cremated in a private ceremony. At the time, he lived in an apartment building located at the corner of Malecón Paul Harris and Jirón Las Magnolias, which was built after he chose to demolish his manor in the 1990s, located in the same place. Of these two streets, the former was the subject of an attempt to rename it after Vargas Llosa in 2006, being ultimately rejected.

Heads of state from several American countries — including Claudia Sheinbaum in Mexico, Dina Boluarte in Peru, Gabriel Boric in Chile, former president Luis Lacalle Pou in Uruguay, as well as former Colombian presidents Álvaro Uribe and Iván Duque — saluted Vargas Llosa's work and legacy. President of France Emmanuel Macron, Prime Minister of Spain Pedro Sánchez, the Spanish royal family, and President of the Federal Republic of Germany Frank-Walter Steinmeier also paid tribute.

The Peruvian government declared 14 April 2025 as a day of national mourning, with flags flown at half-mast on all public buildings and diplomatic representations, in recognition of the writer. In Spain, the city of Marbella, where the author regularly resided, decreed two days of official mourning.

The Community of Madrid announced that it will posthumously award Vargas Llosa the Medalla Internacional de las Artes. On 22 April 2025, the Bernabéu held a minute's silence for him and Leo Beenhakker ahead of Real Madrid's quarter final fixture against Arsenal F.C.

== Impact ==
Vargas Llosa is considered a major Latin American writer, alongside other authors such as Octavio Paz, Julio Cortázar, Jorge Luis Borges, Gabriel García Márquez, Carlos Fuentes, Roberto Bolaño, and Isabel Allende. In his book The New Novel in Latin America (La Nueva Novela), Fuentes offers an in-depth literary criticism of the positive influence Vargas Llosa's work had on Latin American literature. Indeed, for the literary critic Gerald Martin, writing in 1987, Vargas Llosa was "perhaps the most successful ... certainly the most controversial Latin American novelist of the past twenty-five years".

Most of Vargas Llosa's narratives have been translated into multiple languages, marking his international critical success. Vargas Llosa is also noted for his substantial contribution to journalism, an accomplishment shared by few other Latin American writers. He is recognized among those who have most consciously promoted literature in general—and, more specifically, the novel itself—as avenues for meaningful commentary about life. During his career, he wrote more than a dozen novels and many other books and stories, and, for decades, he was a voice for Latin American literature.

A number of Vargas Llosa's works have been adapted for the screen: Peruvian director Francisco Lombardi adapted The Time of the Hero as The City and the Dogs in 1985 and released a film version of Captain Pantoja and the Special Services in 1999, and Vargas Llosa's cousin Luis Llosa adapted The Feast of the Goat in 2005. Aunt Julia and the Scriptwriter was turned into the English-language film Tune in Tomorrow in 1990. The Feast of the Goat has also been adapted as a theatrical play by Jorge Alí Triana, a Colombian playwright and director.

After his death, The Guardian described Vargas Llosa as a "giant of Latin American literature", while The New York Times noted his impact "reverberated far beyond the borders of his native country". The Wall Street Journal called Vargas Llosa a "Marxist-turned-free-marketeer" who explored themes of "despotism, corruption, and fanaticism" in Latin America.

== Awards and honours ==
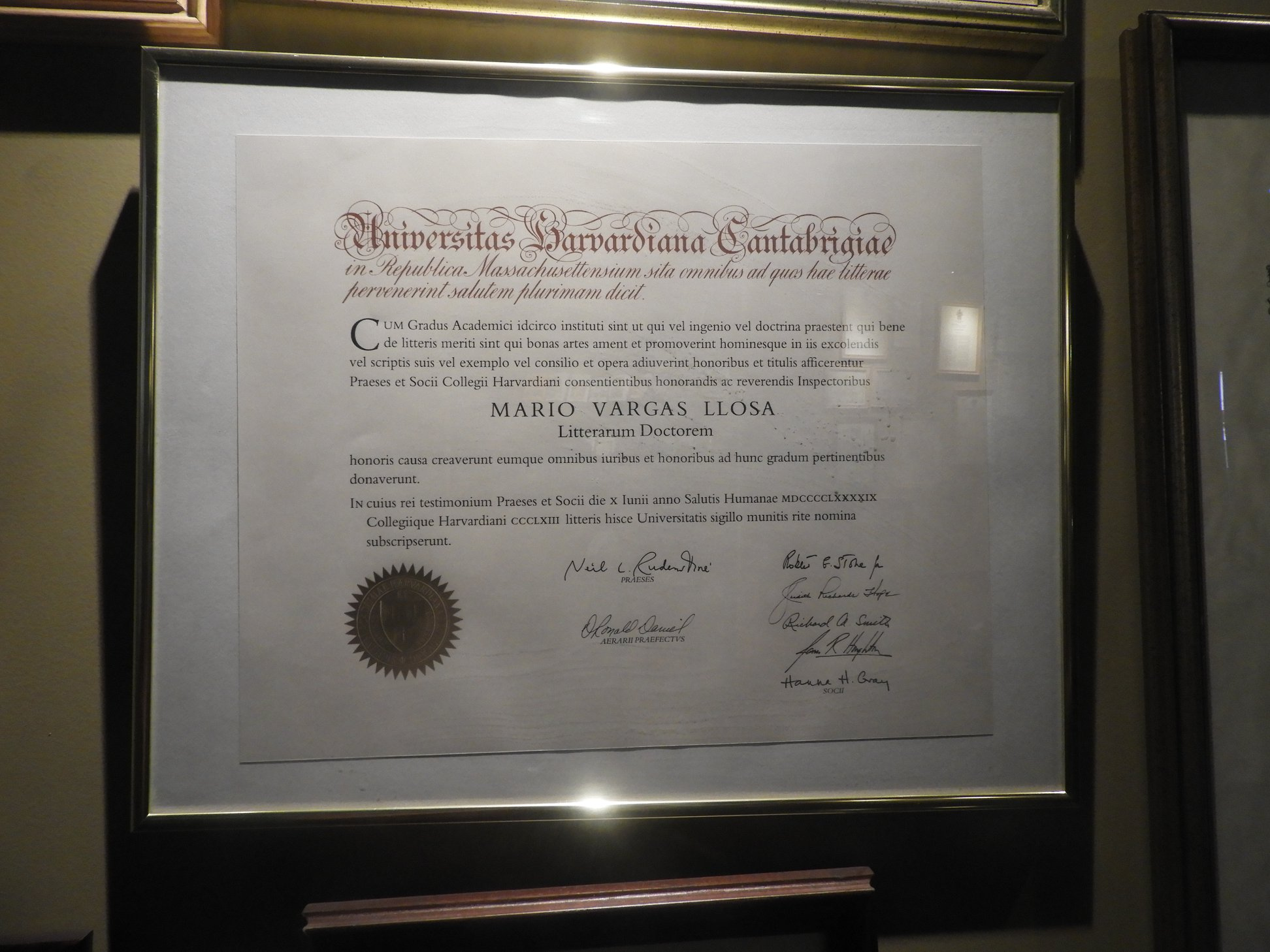
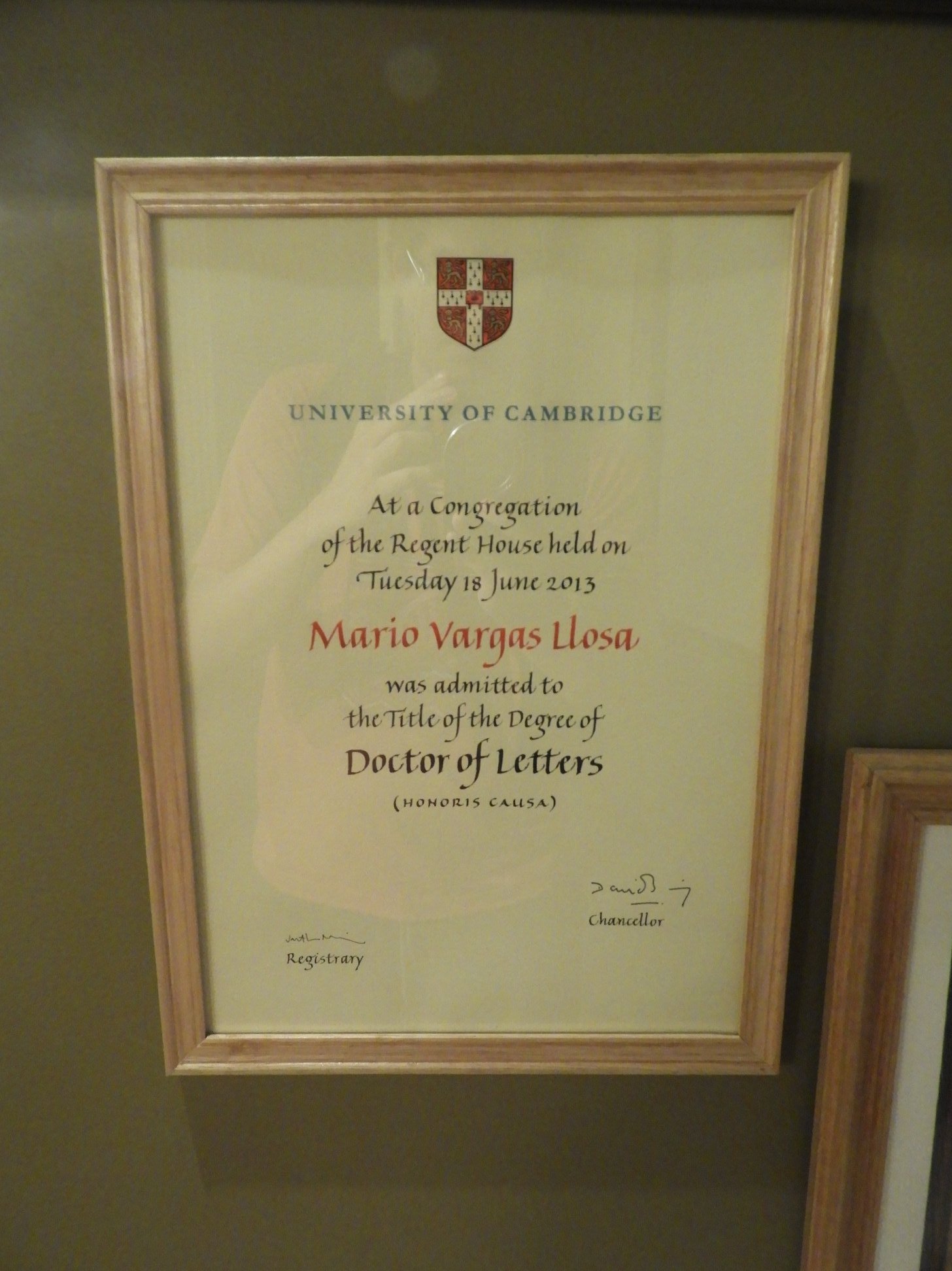
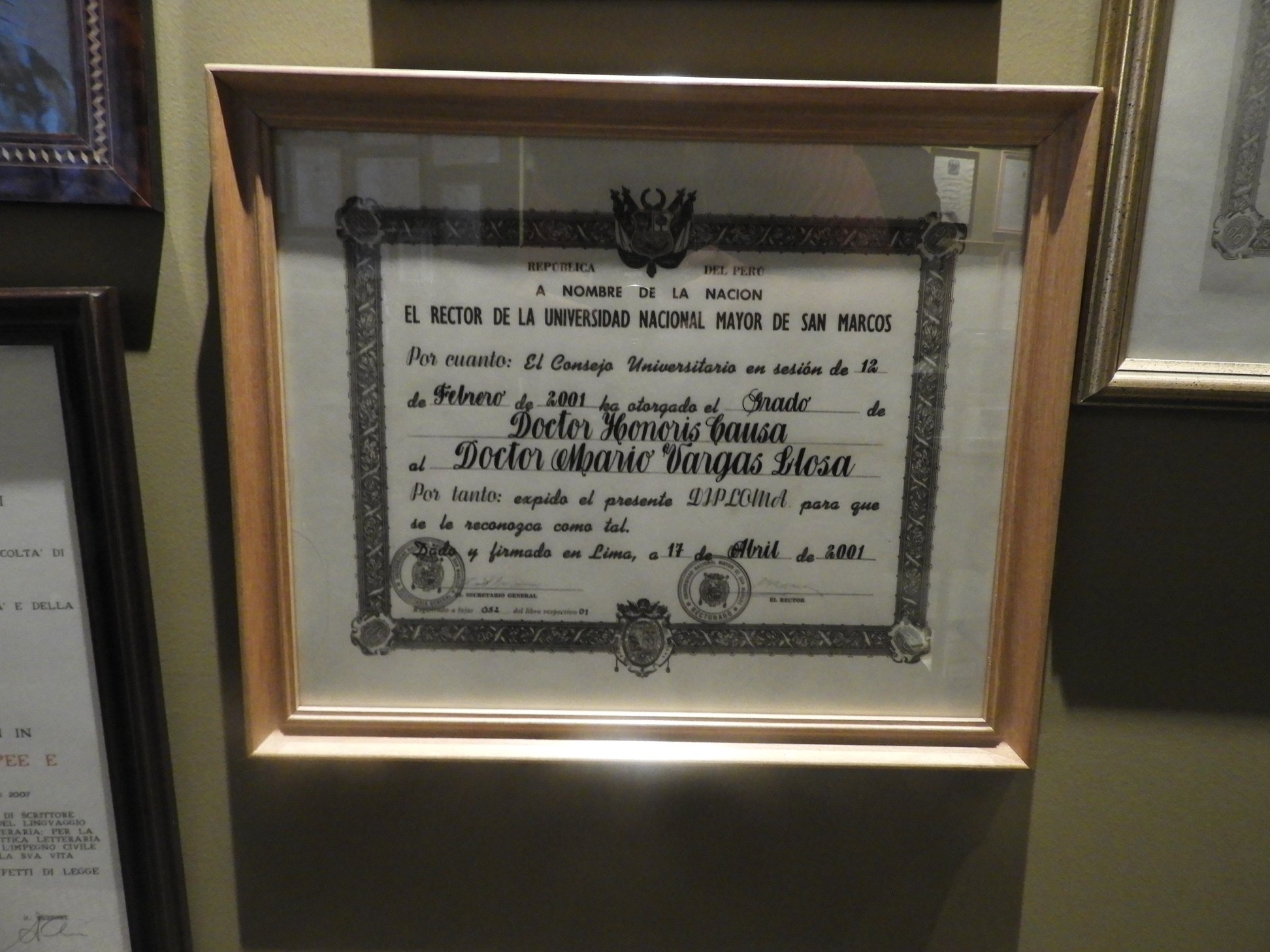
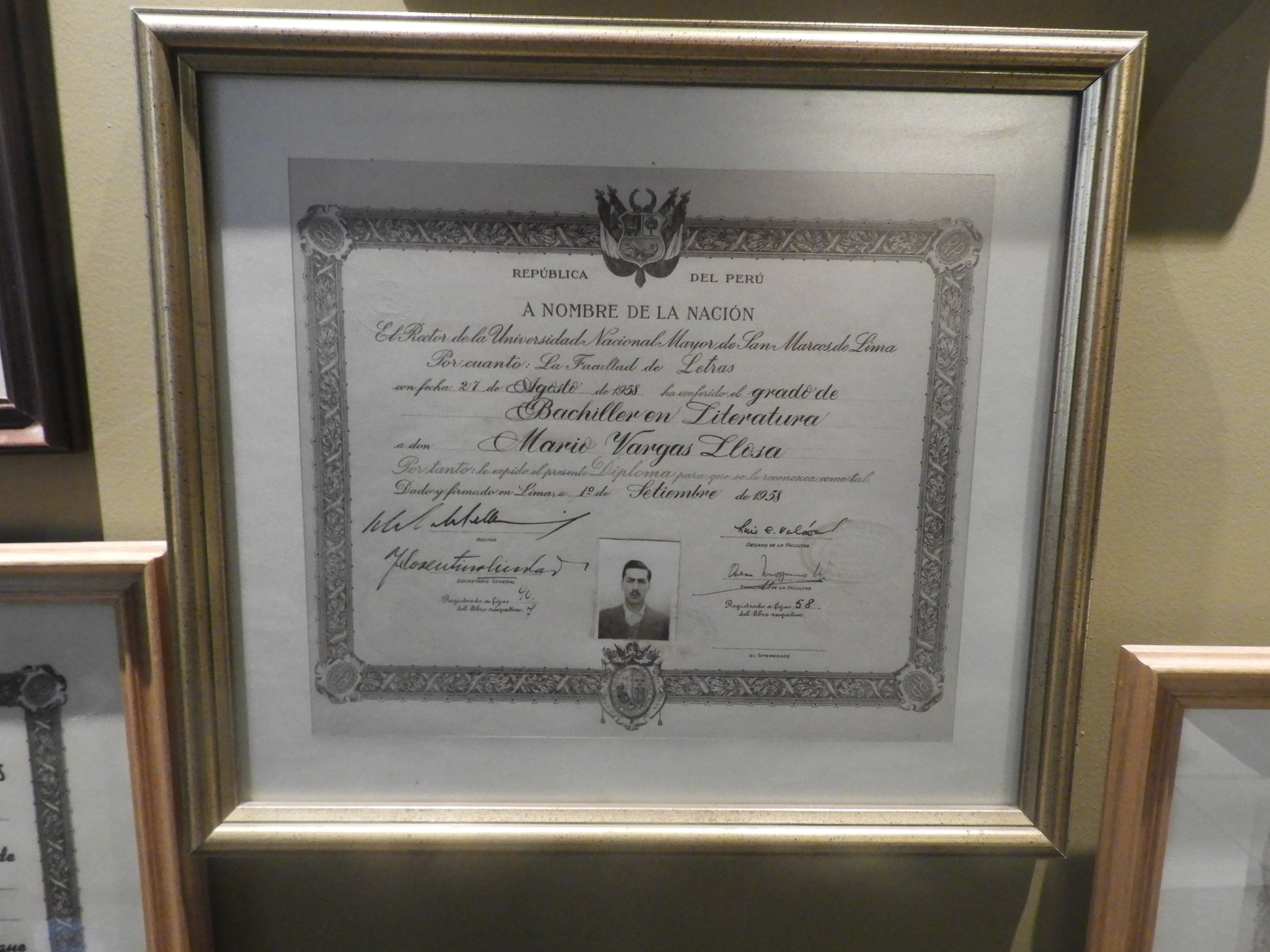
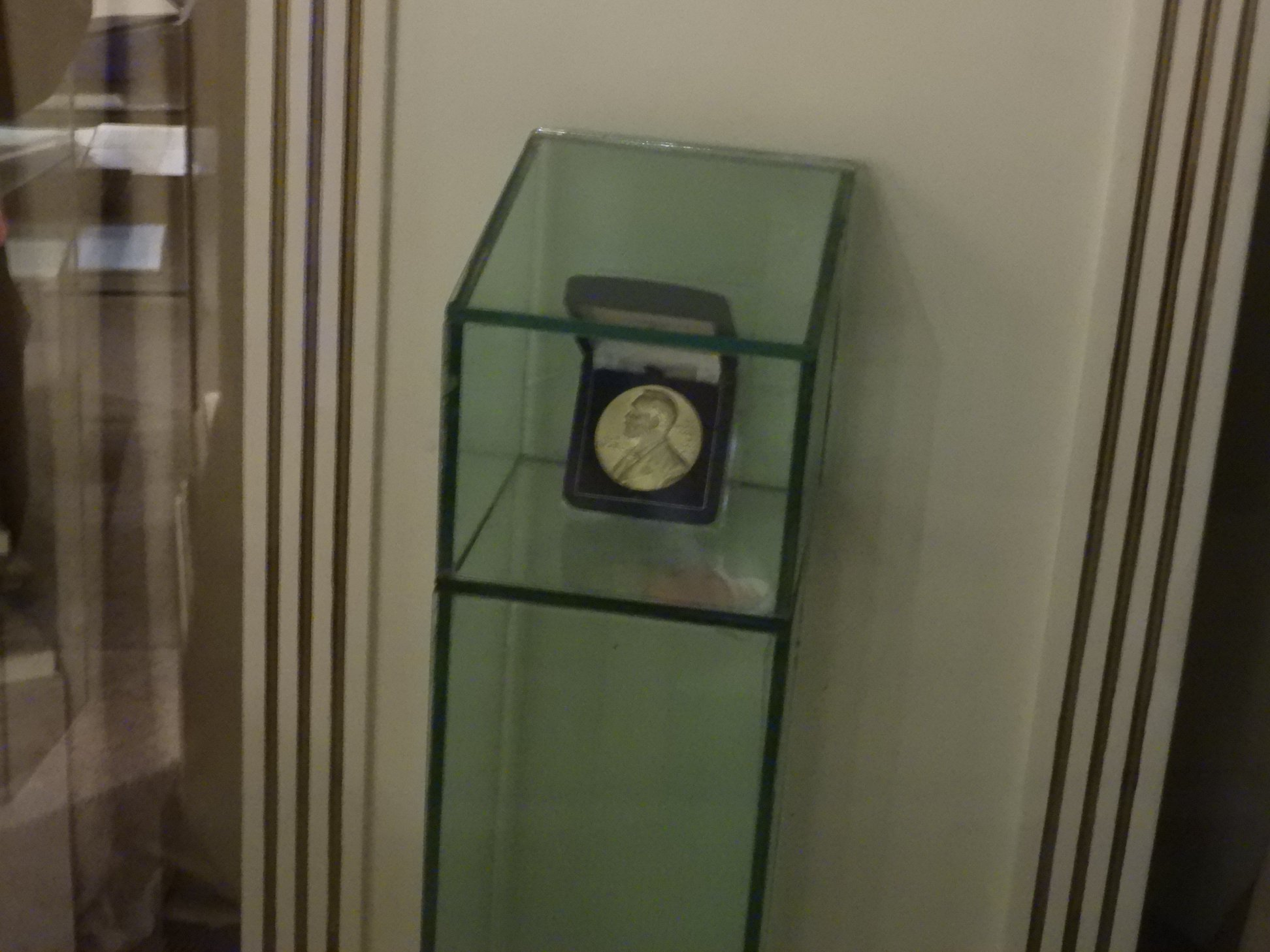
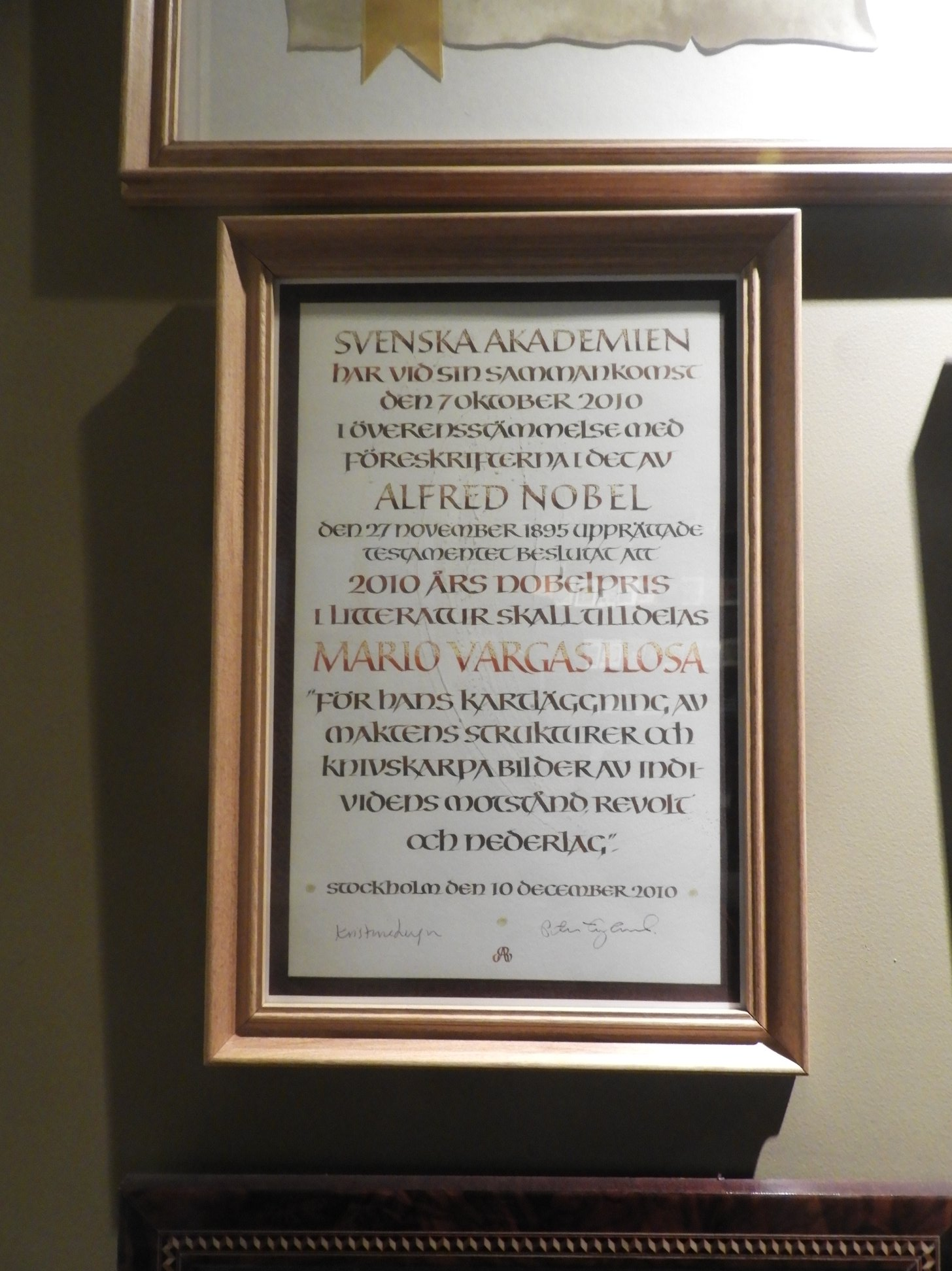
Mario Vargas Llosa awards and honours. From upper left: Honoris Causa Doctorate from Harvard University; Honoris Causa Doctorate from the University of Cambridge; Honoris Causa Doctorate and Bachelor's degree from the National University of San Marcos, his alma mater; Nobel Prize in Literature Medal and Diploma.

Vargas Llosa won numerous awards for his writing, from the 1962 Premio Biblioteca Breve (for The Time of the Hero) to the 1993 Premio Planeta (for Death in the Andes) and the Jerusalem Prize in 1995. The literary critic Harold Bloom included his novel The War of the End of the World in his list of essential literary works in the Western Canon.

One important distinction he received was the 1994 Miguel de Cervantes Prize, considered the most important accolade in Spanish-language literature and awarded to authors whose "work has contributed to enrich, in a notable way, the literary patrimony of the Spanish language". In 2002, Vargas was the recipient of the PEN/Nabokov Award. Vargas Llosa also received the 2005 Irving Kristol Award from the American Enterprise Institute and was the 2008 recipient of the Harold and Ethel L. Stellfox Visiting Scholar and Writers Award at Dickinson College.

On 7 October 2010, the Swedish Academy announced that the 2010 Nobel Prize in Literature was awarded to Vargas Llosa "for his cartography of structures of power and his trenchant images of the individual's resistance, revolt, and defeat". The decision to award Vargas Llosa the Nobel Prize in Literature was well received around the world.

On 18 November 2010, Vargas Llosa received an honorary Degree of Letters from the City College of New York of the City University of New York, where he also delivered the President's Lecture.

On 4 February 2011, Vargas Llosa was elevated to the Spanish nobility by King Juan Carlos I with the hereditary title of Marqués de Vargas Llosa (Marquess of Vargas Llosa).

On 25 November 2021, Vargas Llosa was elected to the Académie française.

=== Honours ===
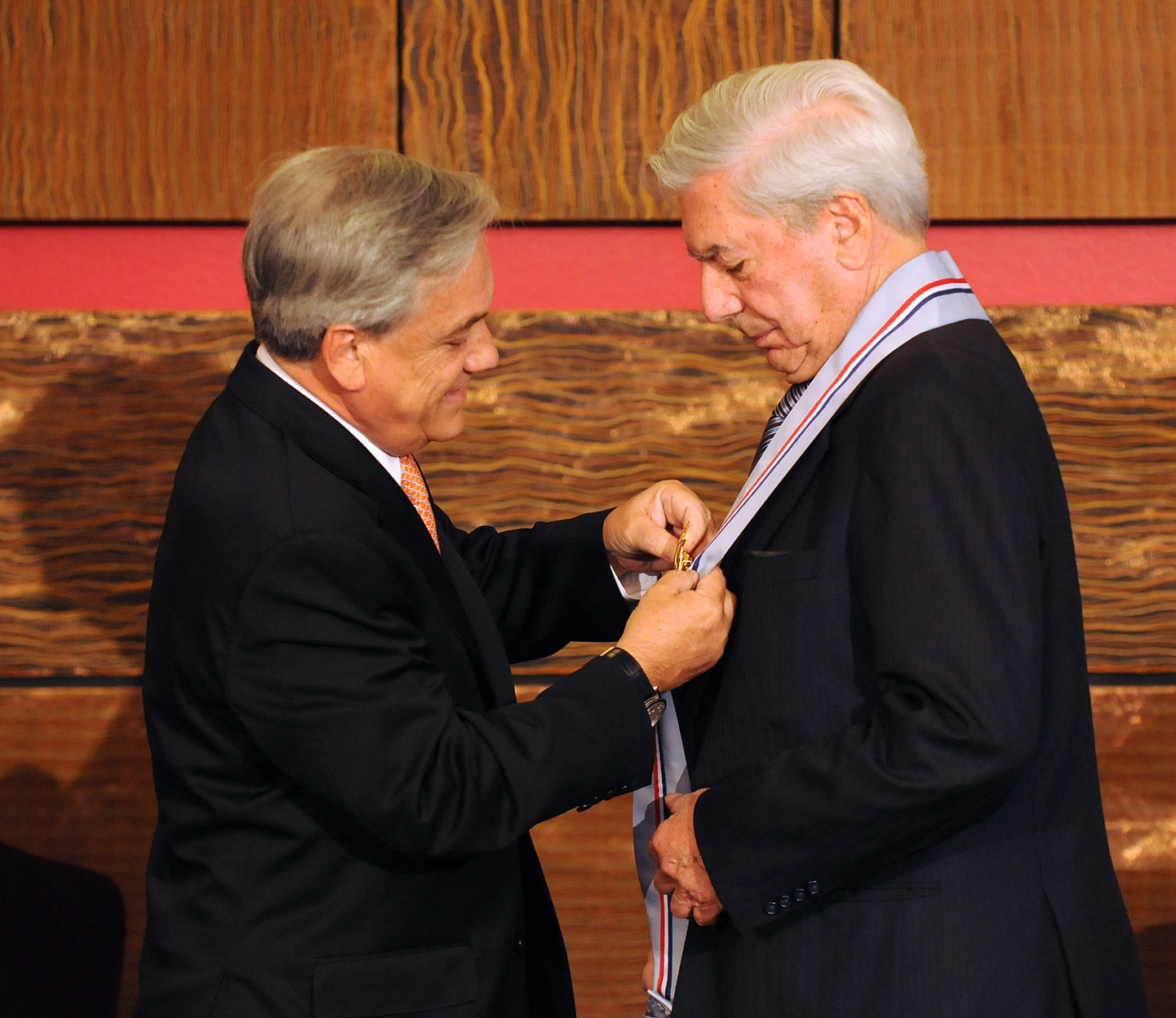
Vargas Llosa receiving the Gabriela Mistral Order of Educational and Cultural Merit from President Sebastián Piñera in 2010

- Chile

First Class of the Gabriela Mistral Order of Educational and Cultural Merit
Pablo Neruda Order of Artistic and Cultural Merit (2018)

- Dominican Republic

Grand Cross with Silver Star of the Order of Christopher Columbus

- France

Chevalier of the Legion of Honour
Commander of the Ordre des Arts et des Lettres

- Mexico

Commander (Placa) of the Order of the Aztec Eagle

- Nicaragua

Grand Cross with Silver Star of the Order of Rubén Darío

- Peru

Member of the Peruvian Academy of Language
Grand Cross with Diamonds of the Order of the Sun of Peru
2011 – Grand Cross of the Medal of Honour of the National University of San Marcos, his alma mater.

- Panama

Grand Cross of the Order of Vasco Núñez de Balboa

- Philippines

Honorary Professor, bestowed by the University of Santo Tomas, Manila

- Spain

Hereditary Marquessate of Vargas Llosa, bestowed by King Juan Carlos I of Spain
Member of the Royal Spanish Academy
Gold Medal of the Community of Madrid

- Romania

Doctor Honoris Causa, bestowed by the Babeș-Bolyai University of Cluj-Napoca, Romania, in 2013

=== Awards ===
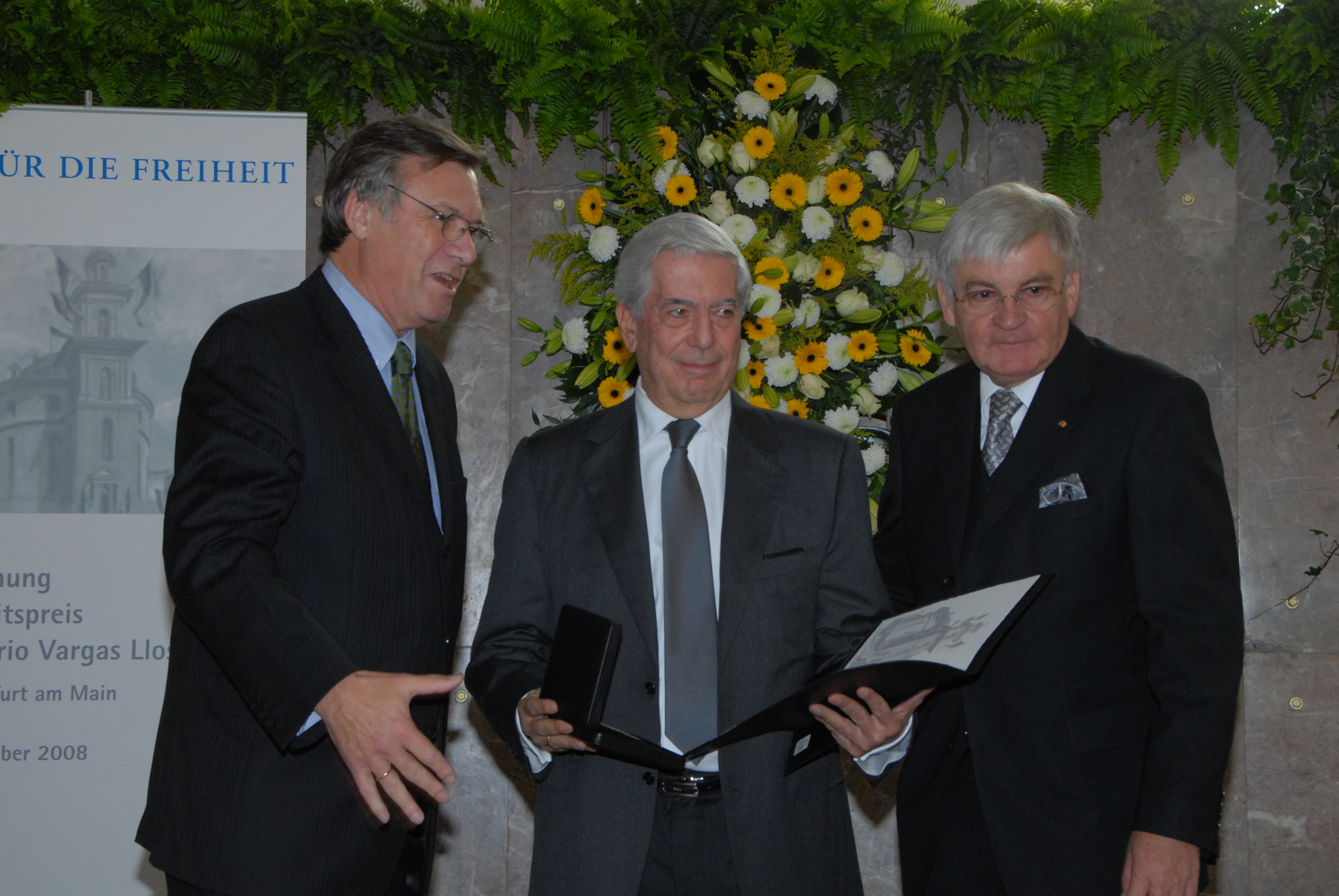
Mario Vargas Llosa (2008)

- Rómulo Gallegos Prize (Venezuela, 1967)
- Prince of Asturias Award for Literature (Spain, 1986)
- Max Schmidheiny Freedom Prize (Switzerland, 1988)
- Miguel de Cervantes Prize (Spain, 1994)
- Nobel Prize in Literature (Sweden, 2010)
- St. Louis Literary Award from the Saint Louis University Library Associates (United States, 2011)
- Carlos Fuentes International Prize for Literary Creation in the Spanish Language (Mexico, 2012)
- Pedro Henríquez Ureña International Prize (Dominican Republic, 2016)

=== Invited commencement addresses ===
- 1992 – Boston University

== Selected works ==
=== Fiction ===
- 1963 – La ciudad y los perros (The Time of the Hero, 1966, ISBN 9780374520212)
- 1966 – La casa verde (The Green House, 1968, ISBN 9780060732790)
- 1969 – Conversación en La Catedral (Conversation in The Cathedral, 1975, ISBN 9780060732806)
- 1973 – Pantaleón y las visitadoras (Captain Pantoja and the Special Service, 1978, ISBN 9780571148189)
- 1977 – La tía Julia y el escribidor (Aunt Julia and the Scriptwriter, 1982, ISBN 9780312427245)
- 1981 – La guerra del fin del mundo (The War of the End of the World, 1985, ISBN 9780312427986)
- 1984 – Historia de Mayta (The Real Life of Alejandro Mayta, 1986, ISBN 9780374525552)
- 1986 – ¿Quién mató a Palomino Molero? (Who Killed Palomino Molero?, 1987, ISBN 9780374525569)
- 1987 – El hablador (The Storyteller, 1989, ISBN 9780312420284)
- 1988 – Elogio de la madrastra (In Praise of the Stepmother, 1990, ISBN 9780312421304)
- 1993 – Lituma en los Andes (Death in the Andes, 1996, ISBN 9780312427252)
- 1997 – Los cuadernos de don Rigoberto (The Notebooks of Don Rigoberto, 1998, ISBN 9780571195756)
- 2000 – La fiesta del chivo (The Feast of the Goat, 2001, ISBN 9780312420277)
- 2003 – El paraíso en la otra esquina (The Way to Paradise, 2003, ISBN 9780312424039)
- 2006 – Travesuras de la niña mala (The Bad Girl, 2007, ISBN 9780571234110)
- 2010 – El sueño del celta (The Dream of the Celt, 2012, ISBN 9780374143466)
- 2013 – El héroe discreto (The Discreet Hero, 2015, ISBN 9780374146740)
- 2016 – Cinco esquinas (The Neighborhood, 2018, ISBN 978-0-374-15512-4)
- 2019 – Tiempos Recios (Harsh Times, 2021, ISBN 978-0-374-60123-2)
- 2023 – Le dedico mi silencio (I Give You My Silence, 2026)

=== Non-fiction ===
- 1958 – Bases para una interpretación de Rubén Darío (Foundations for an Interpretation of Rubén Darío, OCLC 48811330)
- 1971 – García Márquez: historia de un deicidio (García Márquez: Story of a Deicide, OCLC 1011301)
- 1975 – La orgía perpetua: Flaubert y "Madame Bovary" (The Perpetual Orgy, ISBN 843220286X)
- 1978 – La utopía arcaica: José María Arguedas y las ficciones del indigenismo (Archaic utopia: José María Arguedas and the fictions of indigenismo, ISBN 9681648625)
- 1990 – La verdad de las mentiras: ensayos sobre la novela moderna (A Writer's Reality, ISBN 8432206180)
- 1993 – El pez en el agua. Memorias (A Fish in the Water, ISBN 8432206792)
- 1997 – Cartas a un joven novelista (Letters to a Young Novelist, ISBN 9684065043)
- 2000 – Nationalismus als neue Bedrohung (Nationalism as a new threat)
- 2001 – El lenguaje de la pasión (The Language of Passion, ISBN 8403092121)
- 2004 – La tentación de lo imposible (The Temptation of the Impossible, ISBN 9780691131115)
- 2007 – Touchstones: Essays on Literature, Art, and Politics, ISBN 9780571214990
- 2008 – Wellsprings
- 2009 – El viaje a la ficción: El mundo de Juan Carlos Onetti (ISBN 9786034016965)
- 2009 – Sables y utopías: Visiones de América Latina (ISBN 9781603966573
- 2011 – In Praise of Reading and Fiction: The Nobel Lecture (ISBN 9781250907837
- 2012 – La civilización del espectáculo, ISBN 9786123090340
- 2015 – Notes on the Death of Culture (ISBN 9780374710316)
- 2018 – La llamada de la tribu (ISBN 9781947783393)
- 2022 – La mirada quieta (ISBN 9781644735978)

=== Drama ===
- 1952 – La huida del inca
- 1981 – La señorita de Tacna
- 1983 – Kathie y el hipopótamo
- 1986 – La Chunga
- 1993 – El loco de los balcones
- 1996 – Ojos bonitos, cuadros feos
- 2007 – Odiseo y Penélope
- 2008 – Al pie del Támesis
- 2010 – Las mil y una noches

Vargas Llosa's essays and journalism have been collected as Contra viento y marea, issued in three volumes (1983, 1986, and 1990). A selection (plus selected works from La verdad de las mentiras y Desafíos a libertad) has been edited by John King and translated and published as Making Waves (ISBN 978-0140275568).

== See also ==
- Latin American Boom
- Latin American literature

== Sources ==
- Armas Marcelo, J. J. (2002), Vargas Llosa, el vicio de escribir (in Spanish), Madrid: Alfaguara, ISBN 978-84-204-4286-0.
- Barroso Sacoman, Mateus (13 October 2016). Da serra à costa O Peru e as obras de Mario Vargas Llosa de 1950 a 1960 (1. Auflage, neue Ausgabe ed.). Saarbrücken: Novas Edições Acadêmicas. ISBN 978-3-330-74802-6. OCLC 962093882.
- Boland, Roy; Harvey, Sally (1988), Mario Vargas Llosa: From Pantaleón y las visitadoras to Elogio de la madrastra, Auckland: Antipodas, the Journal of Hispanic Studies of the University of Auckland / VOX/AHS, ISBN 978-0-9597858-1-4.
- Booker, M. Keith (1994), Vargas Llosa Among the Postmodernists, Gainesville, FL: University Press of Florida, ISBN 978-0-8130-1248-3.
- Campos, Jorge; Oviedo, Jose Miguel (1981), Vargas Llosa y su Guerra del fin del mundo, Madrid: Taurus Ediciones, ISBN 978-84-306-2131-6
- Castro-Klarén, Sara (1990), Understanding Mario Vargas Llosa, Columbia, SC: University of South Carolina Press, ISBN 978-0-87249-668-2.
- Cevallos, Francisco Javier (1991), "García Márquez, Vargas Llosa, and Literary Criticism: Looking Back Prematurely", Latin American Research Review, 26 (1), Latin American Research Review, Vol. 26, No. 1: 266–275, doi:10.1017/S0023879100035020, JSTOR 2503775, S2CID 252938607.
- Coca, César (27 August 2006), "30 años después de la ruptura con García Márquez, Vargas Llosa desvela las claves literarias y personales", Hoy (in Spanish), archived from the original on 16 October 2015.
- Cohen, Noam (29 March 2007), "García Márquez's Shiner Ends Its 31 Years of Quietude", The New York Times.
- Dammann, Guy (10 January 2007), "Let's hear it for literary feuds", The Guardian, London.
- Fernández, Casto Manuel (1977), Aproximación formal a la novelística de Vargas Llosa (in Spanish), Madrid: Editora Nacional, ISBN 978-84-276-0383-7.
- Franco, Jean (2002), The Decline and Fall of the Lettered City: Latin America in the Cold War, Cambridge, MA: Harvard University Press, ISBN 978-0-674-00842-7.
- Gussow, Mel (28 March 2002), "Lacing his Fiction with History: Vargas Llosa Keeps a Latin American Literary Boom Booming", The New York Times, vol. 151, no. 52071.
- Harrison, Kathryn (14 October 2007), "Dangerous Obsession", The New York Times.
- Heawood, Jonathan (24 November 2003), "Past Master: Review of Mario Vargas Llosa, The Way to Paradise", New Statesman, 132 (4665): 55.
- Igartua, Francisco (1998), Huellas de un destierro, Lima: Aguilar, ISBN 978-9972-00-266-3.
- Kirk, Robin (1997), The Monkey's Paw: New Chronicles from Peru, Amherst, MA: University of Massachusetts Press, ISBN 978-1-55849-109-0.
- Koellmann, Sabine (2002), Vargas Llosa's Fiction and the Demons of Politics, Oxford: Peter Lang, ISBN 978-3-906768-54-0.
- Koellmann, Sabine (2014), A Companion to Mario Vargas Llosa, Woodbridge: Tamesis, ISBN 978-1-85566-269-8.
- Kokotovic, Micha (2007), The Colonial Divide in Peruvian Narrative: Social Conflict and Transculturation, Brighton: Sussex Academic Press, ISBN 978-1-84519-184-9.
- Kordić, Snježana (2005). "Anatomija nacionalizma: recenzija knjige Maria Vargasa Llose, Nationalismus als neue Bedrohung" [Anatomy of nationalism: Review of Mario Vargas Llosa's, Nationalism as a new threat] (PDF). Književna Republika (in Serbo-Croatian). 3 (5–6). Zagreb: 265–268. ISSN 1334-1057. CROSBI 428106. ZDB-ID 2122129-7. Archived (PDF) from the original on 29 May 2012. (CROLIB).
- Kristal, Efraín (1998), Temptation of the Word: The Novels of Mario Vargas Llosa, Nashville, TN: Vanderbilt University Press, ISBN 978-0-8265-1301-4.
- Larsen, Neil (2000), "Mario Vargas Llosa: The Realist as Neo-liberal", Journal of Latin American Cultural Studies, 9 (2): 155–179, doi:10.1080/713679233, S2CID 191650802.
- Lamb, Ruth S (1971), "El mundo mítico en la nueva novela latino americana" (PDF), Centro Virtual Cervantes, Claremont, CA: AIH Actas IV: 101–108.
- Martin, Gerald (1987), "Mario Vargas Llosa: Errant Knight of the Liberal Imagination", in John King (ed.), Modern Latin American Fiction: A Survey, London: Faber and Faber, pp. 205–233.
- Martí-Peña, Guadalupe."Presencia/Ausencia y Différance en Elogio de la madrastra y Los cuadernos de don Rigoberto de Mario Vargas Llosa." In Mario Vargas Llosa: Perspectivas Críticas: Ensayos Inéditos. Ed. Pol Popovic. U. Tecnológico de Monterrey Press, 2009. pp. 365–402.
- Martí-Peña, Guadalupe. "El teatro del ser: dualidad y desdoblamiento en la escenificación narrativa de Los cuadernos de don Rigoberto de Mario Vargas Llosa." Revista Canadiense de Estudios Hispánicos 28.2 (2004): 355–75.
- Miles, Valerie (2014). A Thousand Forests in One Acorn. Rochester: Open Letter. pp. 313–325. ISBN 978-1-934824-91-7.
- Morote, Herbert (1998), Vargas Llosa, tal cual (in Spanish), Lima: Jaime Campodónico.
- Mujica, Barbara (March–April 2004), "Review of Mario Vargas Llosa, The Way to Paradise", Américas, 56 (2): 45.
- Muñoz, Braulio (2000), A Storyteller: Mario Vargas Llosa between Civilization and Barbarism, Lanham, ML: Rowman & Littlefield, ISBN 978-0-8476-9750-2.
- Navarro, Mireya (23 February 2003), "Spring Theater: Political Theater; At the Intersection Of Ruler and Ruled", The New York Times.
- Parker, Emily (23 June 2007), "Storyteller: The Famous Novelist on Politics, and How Writing Can Change the Course of History", Wall Street Journal.
- Perales Contreras, Jaime (2007), "Review on Historia de un Deicidio, en obras completas, vol. VI, Tomo I., in Americas Magazine, Organization of American States, July–August 2007", Americas, vol. 59, no. 4, archived from the original on 14 November 2011.
- Reding, Andrew (Spring 1991), "Mexico: The Crumbling of the "Perfect Dictatorship"", World Policy Journal, 8 (2): 255–284, JSTOR 40209208
- Rospigliosi, Fernando (1996). Las Fuerzas Armadas y el 5 de abril: la percepción de la amenaza subversiva como una motivación golpista. Lima, Peru: Instituto de Estudios Peruanos.
- Setti, Ricardo A. (1989), Dialogos y Conferencias de Vargas Llosa, Madrid, Spain: Editora Inter Mundo., ISBN 978-84-86663-01-8
- Shaw, D.L. (1973), "Review of Vargas Llosa, García Márquez: historia de un deicidio", The Modern Language Review, 68 (2), Glasgow: The Modern Language Review, Vol. 68, No. 2: 430–431, doi:10.2307/3725901, JSTOR 3725901.
- Vargas Llosa, Mario (2003), The Way to Paradise, New York: Farrar, Straus and Giroux, ISBN 978-0-374-22803-3. Trans. Natasha Wimmer.
- Vargas Llosa, Mario (1994). A fish in the water: a memoir. New York: Farrar, Straus, Giroux. ISBN 978-0-374-15509-4.
- Vargas Llosa, Mario (2011) [1994]. A fish in the water : a memoir. Lane, Helen R. New York: Picador. ISBN 978-1-250-00577-9. OCLC 719428763.
- Van Delden, Maarten; Grenier, Yvon (2009), Gunshots at the fiesta, Literature and Politics in Latin America (see chap on Vargas Llosa), Tennessee: Vanderbilt University Press / VOX/AHS, ISBN 978-0-8265-1633-6.
- Vincent, Elizabeth (27 August 2007), "Interview with Mario Vargas Llosa", Maclean's, archived from the original on 6 February 2008.
- Williams, Raymond L. (2001), Vargas Llosa: otra historia de un deicidio, Mexico: Taurus, ISBN 978-968-19-0814-0.

Awards
Preceded by Ángel González Muñiz	Recipient of the Prince of Asturias Award for Literature; 1986	Succeeded by Camilo José Cela
Preceded by Miguel Delibes	Recipient of the Miguel de Cervantes Prize; 1994	Succeeded by Camilo José Cela
Preceded by Herta Müller	Recipient of the Nobel Prize in Literature; 2010	Succeeded by Tomas Tranströmer
Spanish nobility
New title	Marquess of Vargas Llosa; 2011–2025	Succeeded by Álvaro Vargas Llosa
Non-profit organization positions
Preceded by V. S. Pritchett	International President of PEN International; 1976–1979	Succeeded by Per Wästberg
