= Foundations for an Interpretation of Rubén Darío =

1958 essay by Mario Vargas Llosa

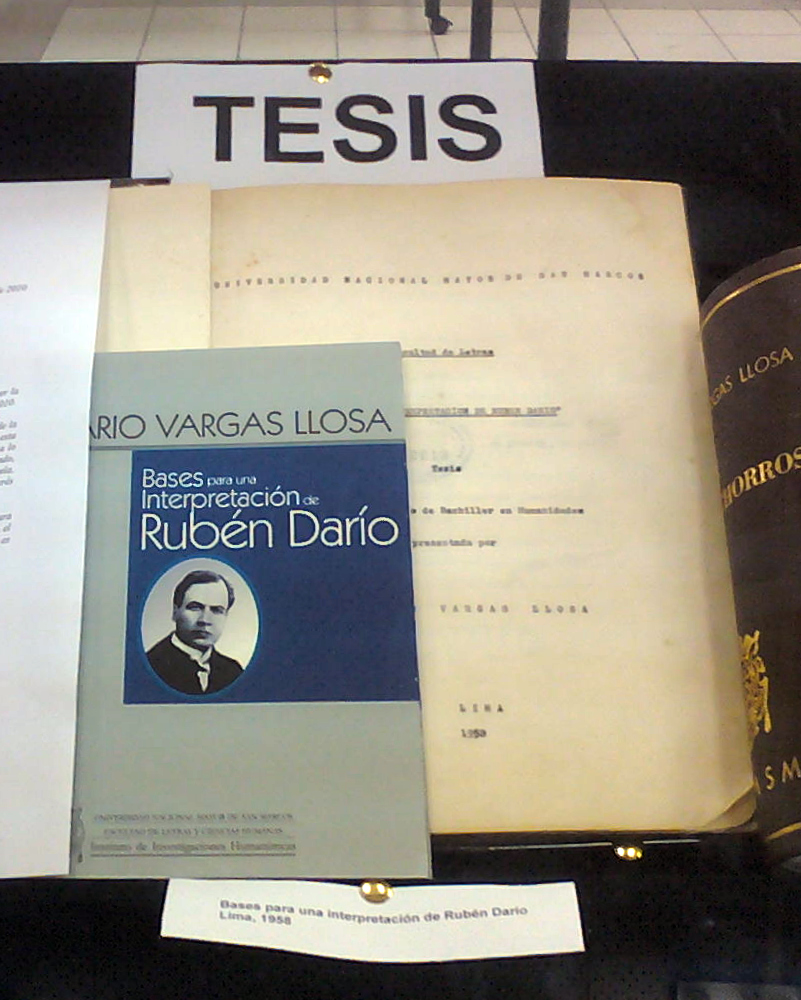
- Author: Mario Vargas Llosa
- Published: 2001
- Publication place: Peru
- Pages: 169
- Written in 1958

Foundations for an Interpretation of Rubén Darío (original title: Bases para una interpretación de Rubén Darío) is a 1958 essay by the Peruvian writer and Nobel Prize in Literature laureate Mario Vargas Llosa (1936–2025). The essay was published in 2001 by the Editorial Fund of the National University of San Marcos.

== Background ==
Thesis by Mario Vargas Llosa, submitted in 1958 to obtain a bachelor's degree in humanities at the National University of San Marcos (Lima, Peru). In this early work by Vargas Llosa, which consists of five chapters, he explores the complex universe of Rubén Darío (his biography, readings, and context), which would help shape the writer’s own vocation. The essay does not focus on the poet’s literary works, but rather on the construction and development of Darío as an artist, with the research proposal centered on the transformation of Félix Rubén García Sarmiento into Rubén Darío. The published work consists of 169 pages and is based on Vargas Llosa thesis submitted in 1958.

== See also ==
- Mario Vargas Llosa
- Rubén Darío
- National University of San Marcos
