= Harsh Times (novel) =

2019 novel by Mario Vargas Llosa

Tiempos recios
- Spanish language edition Tiempos recios
- Author: Mario Vargas Llosa
- Series: Mario Vargas Llosa
- Publication date: 2019
- Preceded by: The Neighborhood

Harsh Times (Spanish: Tiempos recios) is a novel by Peruvian writer Mario Vargas Llosa published in 2019, which narrates the turbulent history of Guatemala in the mid-1950s. The book won the ninth edition of the Francisco Umbral Book of the Year Award 2019.

According to Vargas Llosa, the novel shows "the Latin America of horror, barbarism and violence; a very attractive world for literature, but not in real life, full of injustices".

== Title ==
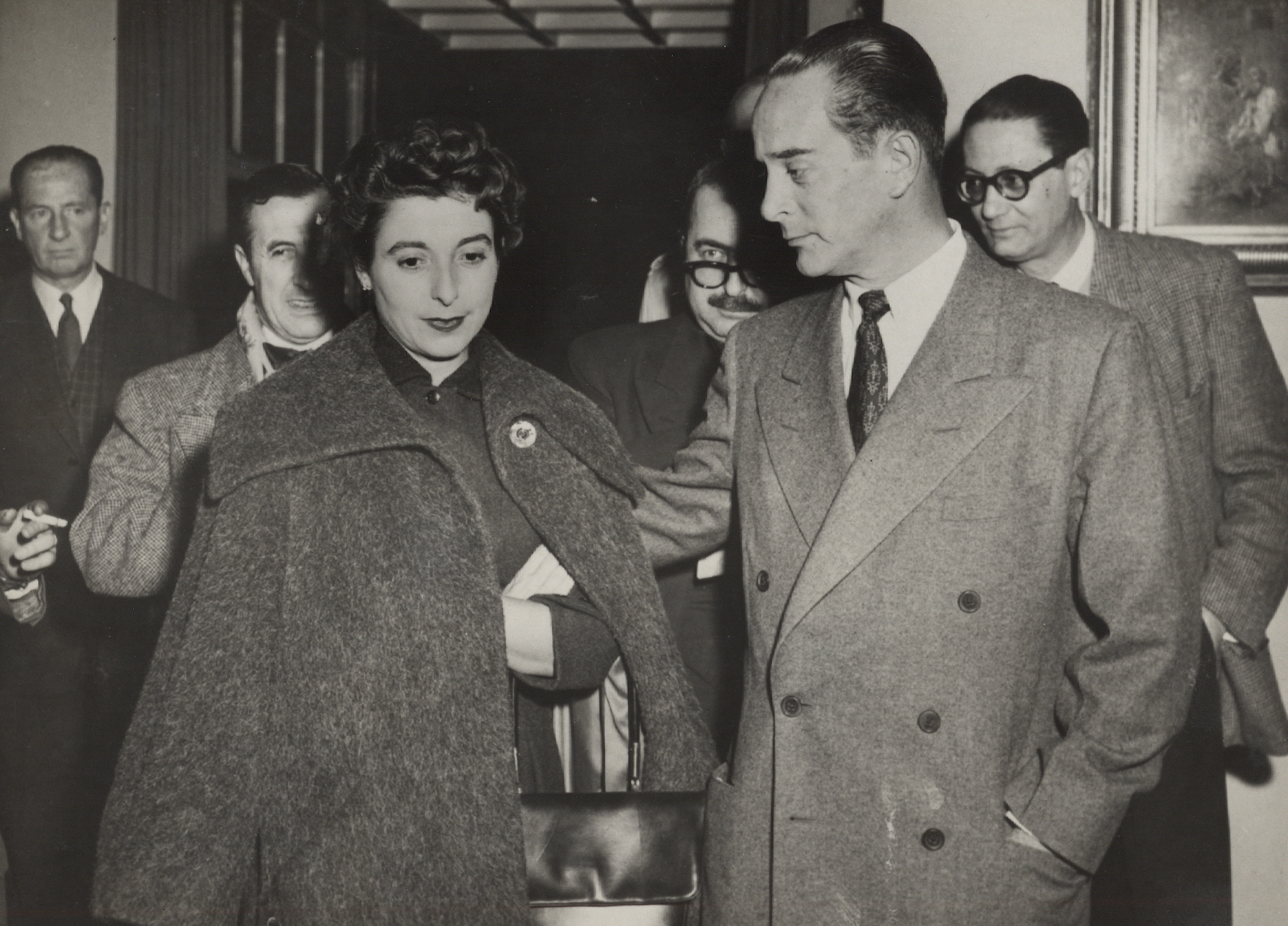
Jacobo Árbenz with his wife Maria Cristina Vilanova, during their exile in Brazil, 1955.

The name of the novel Tiempos recios refers to an expression used by Saint Teresa of Jesus in her autobiographical book Vida de la Madre Teresa de Jesús (chapter 33), "the times were harsh times", to describe the time she had to live, when in 1559, the Inquisition arrested the Archbishop of Toledo, Bartolomé Carranza, and was also held in Valladolid an auto-da-fé against the clergyman Agustín de Cazalla that ended with his execution and was published in the same city the so-called Index of General Inquisitor Fernando de Valdés, which was ordered to collect and burn suspicious books and prohibited the reading of many spiritual works of which Teresa was a faithful follower. Vargas Llosa tries to make a simile between Teresa's time with the also hard times that Guatemala lived during the fifties of the twentieth century.

== Plot ==
The novel portrays the ins and outs of the military coup that in 1954 ended the government of Jacobo Árbenz in Guatemala and elevated Carlos Castillo Armas to the presidency of the country. With a mixture of real and fictitious characters, it reveals the power of manipulation and its capacity to direct public opinion and turn lies into truth.
