= The Storyteller (Vargas Llosa novel) =

1987 novel by Mario Vargas Llosa

- First edition
- Author: Mario Vargas Llosa
- Original title: El hablador
- Translator: Helen Lane
- Language: Spanish
- Publisher: Seix Barral
- Publication date: 1987
- Publication place: Peru
- English publication date: 1989
- Media type: Print

The Storyteller (Spanish: El Hablador) is a novel by Peruvian author and Literature Nobel Prize winner Mario Vargas Llosa. The story tells of Saúl Zuratas, a university student who leaves civilization and becomes a "storyteller" for the Machiguenga Native Americans. The novel thematizes the Westernization of indigenous peoples through missions and through anthropological studies, and questions the perceived notion that indigenous cultures are set in stone.

== Plot ==
The plot develops an extended argument of two sides of what to do with Peru's native Amazonian populations. One side argues that tribes should be left alone to live as they have for millennia, leaving them full access and use of their ancient lands. The other side posits that such ancient ways cannot survive the exploitation of economic interests. In order to save them, natives must be protected by modern intervention of missionaries and government agencies. Through the book, each character seeks ways to protect these groups. Except for Chapter 1, narrated by Mario Vargas Llosa (both a character and the author of the text), even-numbered chapters and narrated by him. These chapters are set at the National University of San Marcos, the radio station where Mario is employed, and several pubs around the city. Odd number chapters are narrated by Saúl Zaratas as the Storyteller for the Machiguenga and are devoted entirely to telling the history of the tribe and its methods of survival. Those chapters are set throughout the Amazon as the Storyteller travels from one group to another. The two characters meet only in the even chapters from time to time, debating politics, university life, and occasionally the rights of the native tribes to either exist as they have or be saved by modernization.

The narrator creates a commentary for public television to shed light on the plight of the Machiguenga, with the hope of convincing himself that the tribe is in better shape for the interventions of modern civilization imposed upon them. Saúl, for his part, fully integrates into the tribe, doffing his western ways and incorporating himself fully as a historian and communication link for the disparate members across the Amazon.

== Main characters ==
=== Narrator ===
Middle-aged, Peruvian writer who is telling the story of the native Amazonian Indians through his experience and that of his friend Saúl, both of whom are obsessed, in different ways, with a particular tribe of Indians, the Machiguengas. At the time of the narrative he is living in Florence Italy and has lost all contact with Saúl. Based on hints, chance encounters and indirect evidence, the narrator comes to the conclusion that Saúl has not only disappeared into the Peruvian jungle but has, somehow, become a tribal storyteller of the Machiguengas.

=== Saúl Zuratas ===
Fellow student at San Marcos and friend of the overall narrator. To an increasing degree, he becomes a second narrator, though it is not clear to the reader whether it is the actual Saúl or the first narrator's idea of Saúl that is doing the second narration. Saúl is also called "Mascarita" because of the large birthmark "mask" that covers half of his face. Saúl develops a deep connection to and appreciation for the Machiguenga Indians during his time at college and apparently trades in his life in modern civilization in order to travel amongst the tribes as a storyteller or "hablador."

=== Machiguenga Tribe ===
The tribe of the Amazonian Natives whose stories and fate are the basis of the book.

=== Tasurinchi ===
Is a name used in the storytelling chapters throughout Vargas Llosa's book, one that can cause considerable confusion. Because the Machiguengas do not use personal names, "Tasurinchi" is not a consistent individual, but the name used for the person or god about whom someone is talking. It is used, roughly, to mean "revered male about whom we are speaking". Early in the book Saul defines Tasurinchi as "the god of good", but this is just one use of the name. During his storytelling, Mascarita uses "Tasurinchi" as a pronoun used to stand for oneself, other males, and even the sun. Later, as Mascarita goes more "native," he adopts the name as a person pronoun, referring to himself as "Tasurinchi."

=== Don Salomon Zuratas ===
Saúl Zuratas's father. After Don Salomon dies, Saul leaves the city to become the storyteller.

== Major Themes, symbols, and motifs ==
To analyze the themes in a broader concept, Vargas asks the reader to think about the positive and negative effects of globalization, specifically through the roles of the Viracochas (White men, most typically used in negatively describing the ruthless rubber merchant of the rubber boom) and the missionaries. The Viracochas used the native Indians to harvest rubber, promising them food, shelter and goods to come work for them. The Viracochas treated the Indians horribly once they got to the camps and began pitting the tribes against each other once manpower became scarce. They would send Mashcos to capture three Machiguengas or vice versa to buy their "freedom." "They wanted to Bleed us like they bled the trees." The Viracochas shed a negative light on globalization by exploiting the land and people for profit. Regarding the missionaries and linguists at the Summer Institute, the line between negative and positive impacts are blurred. By studying the Machiguengas, learning their language, and teaching them English and religion, some may argue that the native Indians are being saved from extinction in modern civilization. Others argue that the linguists and missionaries are a "tentacle of American imperialism which, under the cover of doing scientific research, has been engaged in gathering intelligence and has taken the first steps toward a neocolonist penetration of the cultures of the Amazonian Indian." Through these examples of progress versus preservation, Vargas Llosa asks the reader, "which is more important?"

=== Cultural nomadism ===
The Machiguenga are described as "walkers". A vital aspect of their character is the nomadic nature of social tradition. This transient lifestyle informs their ability to learn from new experiences and encourages curiosity for other cultures. The narrator, Mario, begins to tell the story of Saul (who he suspects is the subject in a mysterious photograph displayed in a gallery in Florence). Through Saul's stories of his ethnological research, Mario illustrates the Amerindian general thirst for the unknown. This custom manifests as acceptance of the other. Despite his physical imperfections (and cultural differences), the Machiguenga accept Mascarita. The issue of cultural tradition and abomination are discussed and highlights this very idea of multi-cultural acceptance. Mascarita astutely remarks on the traditional killings of newborns that are born with imperfections. This tradition truly exemplifies Machiguenga respect for the foreigner. If Mascarita was native to the tribe, his birthmark would have led to his immediate demise. By allowing Mascarita to live and learn from their culture the Machiguenga implicitly accept him by sparing his life. This acceptance is guided by a tenet that is so essential to the fabric of their society: cultural nomadism.

=== Birthmark ===
Saúl's birthmark is more of a symbol, but it still touches upon the theme of cultural hybridism. While Saúl finds himself to be infatuated with the Machiguenga culture, his birthmark is essentially a constant reminder of the society from which he truly came. When interacting with Westerners, Saúl gladly accepts any insults he is given that relate to the birthmark and even accepts the nickname "Mascarita," translating to "mask-face." When a drunk man calls him a monster and tells him to keep his face off the streets, Saúl simply smiles and replies, "but if this is the only one I've got, what do you suggest I do?" (14). Saúl finally gets flustered when discussing the fact that the Machiguengas kill any newborns who are imperfect. Since Saúl's face is "deformed," he would not have lived had he been born into the Machiguenga society. The narrator notes that this was "the only time he ever alluded, not jokingly but seriously, even dramatically, to what was undoubtedly a tragedy in his life" (26). Since so many of his relationships in the past have been killed off by his imperfection, Saúl seems afraid that his relationship with the Machiguengas will be marred by this permanent reminder of Western culture. The mark also helps accentuate the Machiguenga's practice of unity and collectivism. In the end, they accept him as a person more than any Western culture did.

=== Storytelling ===
As indicated by the novel's title, storytelling is a very prominent theme in The Storyteller. After hearing about the special role of Hablador or Storyteller in Machiguenga culture, he is immediately intrigued by it. "They're a tangible proof that storytelling can be something more than mere entertainment... Something primordial, something that the very existence of a people may depend on. Maybe that's what impressed me so." (94). The author even goes on to say that stories are the essence of a culture and that Saúl's position as the Storyteller is a feat that requires penetrating the heart of the Machiguenga culture. In this way, The Storyteller can be seen as a work of metafiction on a self-aware level in the author's chapters and on an unconscious level in the Storyteller's chapters. Throughout the novel, both the author and the Storyteller question what it means to tell stories and why they are important. This is done through the questioning of the many different stories told in the novel. The stories Saúl tells the author, the stories the Storyteller tells the audience, and even the memories narrated by the author are questioned by the author as being inaccurate and heavily dependent on who is telling it. In the storytelling chapters this is done by the constant qualification of statements with the words "perhaps", "maybe", "it seems", and "That, anyway, is what I have learned."

=== Native myths ===
The parts of the novel narrated by the storyteller are mostly the accounts of the mythological figures in the Machiguenga culture. These native myths often do not have explicit lessons, but instead narrate the complicated Machiguenga mythology. The early parts of the novel begin with creation myths which explain the nomadic, non possessive nature of the Machiguenga people. As the novel progresses, however, the myths begin to relate to Jewish and Christian figures such as Jesus. Ultimately, it is revealed that the storyteller has begun to hybridize the native myths with Western stories and traditions.

=== Religion ===
Religion is one of the forefront motifs in The Storyteller. While the author's own religion is not explored deeply, he is shown to see religion as a system of rituals and this view is demonstrated early in the novel. "The Catholic religion was a breeze, a measly half-hour Mass every Sunday and Communion every first Friday of the month that was over in no time." (p. 9) This passage shows the author's view of religion as a ritual that requires effort rather than a strong belief system by which to live life.

Much more is written about Saúl's religion. As a Peruvian Jew, Saúl participates in holidays such as Sabbath and knows much about Judaism. However, he and his mother (who was a Jewish convert) would play games together to pass the time in the synagogue. Also, any other efforts put forth by Saúl to study Judaism are also efforts to please Don Salomón. Later in the story, the author hears that Saúl has left the University to study in Israel with his father. The author is skeptical of this news since Saúl was so invested in the Machinguenga culture. It is later revealed that Saúl has instead gone into the Amazonian jungle to live with the Machinguengas as their storyteller. At this role, Saúl hybridizes religious stories from the Bible with the native mythology, demonstrating his views of relativism.

=== Gregor Samsa ===
Gregor Samsa, the protagonist of Franz Kafka's The Metamorphosis, is mentioned many times in the story as a motif. In The Metamorphosis, the protagonist Gregor Samsa wakes up transformed into a monstrous verminous bug. Saúl has read The Metamorphosis to a point where he "knew [it] by heart" (17). He even names his pet parrot Gregor Samsa, indicating an intimate association with the story. Saúl also makes several more references to Gregor Samsa throughout the novel whenever he speaks of something or someone out of the ordinary. For example, Saúl would refer to the Machiguenga disfigured babies (who would be killed by their mothers) as "Gregor Samsas" (25). He even uses that term as a way to bring attention to his own disfigurement, his birthmark. In the stories he tells, he eventually fuses the idea of the thunder god Tasurinchi with Gregor Samsa in the later chapters — "Gregor-Tasurinchi" — as an example of his eventual cultural hybridism.

=== Academia ===
The academic world, represented in the novel by the University of San Marcos and the Summer Institute of Linguistics, is actively engaged by the author. He not only completes his studies at the University of San Marcos in Literature, but he also participates in expeditions done by the Summer Institute of Linguistics. In fact, it is revealed in the beginning that the author is in Italy "to read Dante and Machiavelli and look at Renaissance paintings for a couple of months in solitude." (4). The academic world is heavily criticized by Saúl Zuratas, however. In Saúl's view, academia is a means of aggressive Western proselytization. "Those apostolic linguists of yours are the worst of all. They work their way into the tribes to destroy them from within, just like chiggers." (p. 95) While Saúl himself is a student for the early part of the novel, he says that he is a student only to please Don Salomón. Ultimately, he leaves the University of San Marcos presumably for Israel. It is later revealed, however, that Saúl left to join the Machiguengas.

== Development history ==
Mario Vargas Llosa made a journey into the Amazon Jungle in 1958. He felt that "The absence of law and institutions exposed the jungle natives to the worst humiliations and acts of injustice by colonists, missionaries and adventurers, who had come to impose their will through the use of terror and force.". Instead of finding the landscape exotic, he was faced with violence and cruelty of the native tribes. This trip into the jungle would be Vargas Llosa's inspiration for several of his novels, including The Storyteller.

'The Storyteller' originally written in Spanish, was translated in 1989 by Helen Lane, translator for numerous authors of many different languages. Since its original publication 25 years ago, "The Storyteller has become a classic and is required reading for most anthropology students in the universities of the United States and South America".

=== Publication history ===
- 1987, Spain (Barcelona), Seix Barral Biblioteca Breve
- English trans.: 1989, USA, Farrar, Straus and Giroux, Helen Lane
- German translation by Der Geschichtenerzähler

=== Explanation of the novel's title ===
The "storyteller" (hablador) of the title refers primarily to a position within Machiguenga culture — to a person who preserves and recites the culture's history and beliefs to the rest of the tribe. The narrator, himself a writer, is fascinated by this type of person in various cultures around the world, such as the Celtic seanchaí, which he refers to for comparison; he is even more intrigued to find that in the twenty years since his first encounter with habladores, they seem to have disappeared — none of the Machiguenga will even acknowledge the storyteller exists.

The "storyteller" has a secondary reference to the narrator himself, a writer who briefly runs a television show that tries to copy the work of the hablador by presenting assorted stories of cultural significance.

=== Controversy ===
The storyteller is full of many provocative ideals and opinions. Vargas Llosa commonly writes about violence, corruption, and struggling against authoritarian regimes. 'The Storyteller' chronicles continuing devastation in the rain forest. Over the last few decades, missionaries have occidentalised the Amazon Indians. There are few tribes that are still isolated from the rest of the world. A clear question brought into mind by the novel is: Is it better to back off and leave native tribes such as the Machiguenga alone, or will their lives be worse off without outside influence? This, amongst other questions, put the novel at the center of a large debate.

== Formal criticism and reception ==
The Storyteller was regarded highly among most literary critics. Ursula K. Le Guin, NY Times correspondent for the book review supplement, briefly summarized her reactions to the novel, describing the Storyteller as a science fiction novel; it portrays a fictitious tribe that has been immune to acculturation and Western influence and its influence on a Jewish ethnologist seeking to learn more about their culture. She gives the book an impressive review, praising Vargas Llosa's ability to discuss the role of Western influence on the native and the overpowering impact of primitive culture on the white man. She writes, "To me this is Mr. Vargas Llosa's most engaging and accessible book, for the urgency of its subject purifies and illuminates the writing. I was spellbound, as if by the voice of that storyteller in the circle of listeners (Le Guin 1989)."

The Kirkus review comments on Vargas Llosa's fruitless efforts to emphasize the role of storytelling. This formal review criticizes this essential component to the novel, accusing Vargas Llosa of writing a novel that is "unsatisfying and cobbled-up" (Kirkus Review 1989).

The Publishers Weekly gave the Storyteller a rave review. "Written in the direct, precise, often vernacular prose that Vargas Llosa embues with elegance and sophistication, this is a powerful call to the author's compatriots — and to other nations — to cease despoiling the environment" (Publishers Weekly 1989).

The New York Times Book Review praised The Storyteller as "Intellectual, ethical, and artistic, all at once and brilliantly so."

Raymond Sokolov, of The Wall Street Journal, credited the novel as being "Brilliant . . . A whole culture is contained within these dreamy narratives".

Time magazine comments on The Storyteller: "A fascinating tale . . . with enormous skill and formal grace, Vargas Llosa weaves through the mystery surrounding the fate of Saul Zuratas."

== Awards and nominations ==
Though The Storyteller itself has won no awards, the author, Mario Vargas Llosa, won the Prince Asturias Award for Literature in 1986, the Miguel de Cervantes Prize in 1994, and the Nobel Prize in Literature. Upon Llosa's acceptance of the Nobel Prize, Peter Englund of the Swedish Academy referred to him as a "divinely gifted storyteller". While Englund had no intentions of singling out this particular novel itself, novels such as The Storyteller undoubtedly contributed towards Llosa's ultimate earning of this prize by expressing themes and motifs while continuing to be entertaining.

== Sources ==
- Le Guin, Ursula K. (October 29, 1989). "Feeling the Hot Breath of Civilization". The New York Times Book Review.
- "Review of The Storyteller, by Mario Vargas Llosa". Publishers Weekly. Vol. 250, no. 9. 1989.
- "Review: The Storyteller". Kirkus Reviews. October 1989.
- "Mario Vargas Llosa". Mario Vargas Llosa. 9 May 2012.
