= Helen Lane =

American translator (1921–2004)

Helen Lane (1921 – August 29, 2004) was an American translator of Spanish, Portuguese, French and Italian language literary works into English. She translated works by numerous important authors including Jorge Amado, Juan Goytisolo, Juan Carlos Onetti, Octavio Paz, Nélida Piñon, Augusto Roa Bastos, Juan José Saer, Claude Simon, Luisa Valenzuela, and Mario Vargas Llosa. She was a recipient of the National Book Award.

== Career ==
Lane began her career in the 1940s as a government translator in Los Angeles, before moving to New York City to work for publishers there. She became a freelance translator in 1970, and moved to the Dordogne in France. In addition to her books, she also provided subtitles for films by Jean-Luc Godard and Haskell Wexler.

Alternating Current, Lane's translation of Octavio Paz, won the 1974 U.S. National Book Award in the category Translation (a split award). She received the PEN Translation Prize in 1975 for her translation of Count Julian by Juan Goytisolo and in 1985 for her translation of The War at the End of the World by Mario Vargas Llosa.

== Life ==
She was born Helen Ruth Overholt in Minneapolis and graduated summa cum laude in 1943 from the University of California, Los Angeles, where in 1953 she obtained a master's degree in Romance Languages and Romance Literatures. She continued her coursework at UCLA to the doctoral level. In 1954, Lane was awarded a Fulbright Fellowship to France. She studied at the Sorbonne for one year.

== List of translations ==
- Jorge Amado: Pen, Sword, Camisole
- Edmond Barincou: Machiavelli
- Maria Isabel Barreno, Maria Teresa Horta and Maria Velho da Costa: The Three Marias: New Portuguese Letters
- Marguerite Duras: "An Interview with Marguerite Duras", in Destroy, She Said
- Tomás Eloy Martínez: Santa Evita
- Tomás Eloy Martínez: The Perón Novel
- Juan Goytisolo: Count Julian
- Juan Goytisolo: State of Siege
- Servando Teresa de Mier: The Memoirs of Fray Servando Teresa de Mier
- Juan Carlos Onetti: Let the Wind Speak
- Octavio Paz: The Double Flame
- Octavio Paz: Essays on Mexican Art
- Octavio Paz: Alternating Current
- Georges Perec: Les Choses: A Story of the Sixties
- Nélida Piñon: Caetana's Sweet Song
- Elena Poniatowska: Massacre in Mexico
- Augusto Roa Bastos: I, the Supreme
- Ernesto Sabato: On Heroes and Tombs
- Juan José Saer: Nobody Nothing Never
- Juan José Saer: The Event
- Juan José Saer: The Investigation
- Claude Simon: Conducting Bodies
- Claude Simon: Triptych
- Luisa Valenzuela: He Who Searches
- Mario Vargas Llosa: Aunt Julia and the Scriptwriter
- Mario Vargas Llosa: The War of the End of the World
- Mario Vargas Llosa: The Storyteller
- Mario Vargas Llosa: A Fish in the Water
