= Uchuraccay =

Village in Huanta, Peru

Coordinates: 12.8260°S 74.1161°W

Uchuraccay is a village in the Peruvian province of Huanta, Ayacucho Region. It is located 4,000 metres above sea level. The population as of the census of 1981 was 470 inhabitants. In 1983, eight Peruvian journalists were murdered in Uchuraccay, resulting in a presidential commission headed by Mario Vargas Llosa to find the facts of the case. Uchuraccay community members (comuneros) were put on trial for the murders. The town was deserted in 1984 due to the Peruvian government's struggle against Sendero Luminoso, but some families eventually returned.
