= Jean Franco =

British-born American academic and literary critic (1924–2022)

Jean Franco (March 31, 1924 – December 14, 2022) was a British-born American academic and literary critic known for her pioneering work on Latin American literature. Educated at Manchester and London, she taught at London, Essex (where she was the university's first professor of Latin American literature), and Stanford, and was latterly professor emerita at Columbia University.

== Research ==
Jean Franco's research was wide-ranging and voluminous. She was among the first English-speaking Latin Americanists to write seriously about Latin American literature. She particularly focused on women and women's writing and was a pioneer of Latin American cultural studies.

== Personal life and death ==
Franco died on December 14, 2022, at the age of 98.

== Awards ==
- In 1992 she was awarded an honorary doctorate from the University of Essex.
- In 1996 she won a PEN award for lifetime contribution to the dissemination of Latin American literature in English.
- In 2000 the Latin American Studies Association awarded her the Kalman Silvert Award for her contributions to Latin American Studies.
- In 2002 she was awarded an honorary doctorate from the University of Manchester.
- Her book The Decline and Fall of the Lettered City was awarded the Bolton-Johnson Prize by the Conference of Latin American Historians for the best work in English on the History of Latin America published in 2003.

== Selected publications ==
- The Modern Culture of Latin America (1967)
- An Introduction to Latin American Literature (1969)
- Spanish American Literature Since Independence (1973)
- César Vallejo. The Dialectics of Poetry and Silence (1976)
- Plotting Women. Gender and Representation in Mexico (1989)
- Marcar diferencias, cruzar fronteras: ensayos (1996)
- Critical Passions: Selected Essays, edited by Mary Louise Pratt and Kathleen Newman (1999)
- The Decline and Fall of the Lettered City: Latin America in the Cold War (2002)
- Cruel Modernity (2013)
