= Martin Guerre (disambiguation) =

Martin Guerre was a 16th century French peasant.

Martin Guerre may also refer to:

- Martin Guerre (musical), by Claude-Michel Schönberg and Alain Boublil

== See also ==
- The Wife of Martin Guerre, 1941 novel by American Janet Lewis
- The Return of Martin Guerre, 1982 French film
- The House of Martin Guerre, musical by Leslie Arden & Anna Theresa Cascio
