= Steven Bednarski =

Canadian actor and historian (born 1973)

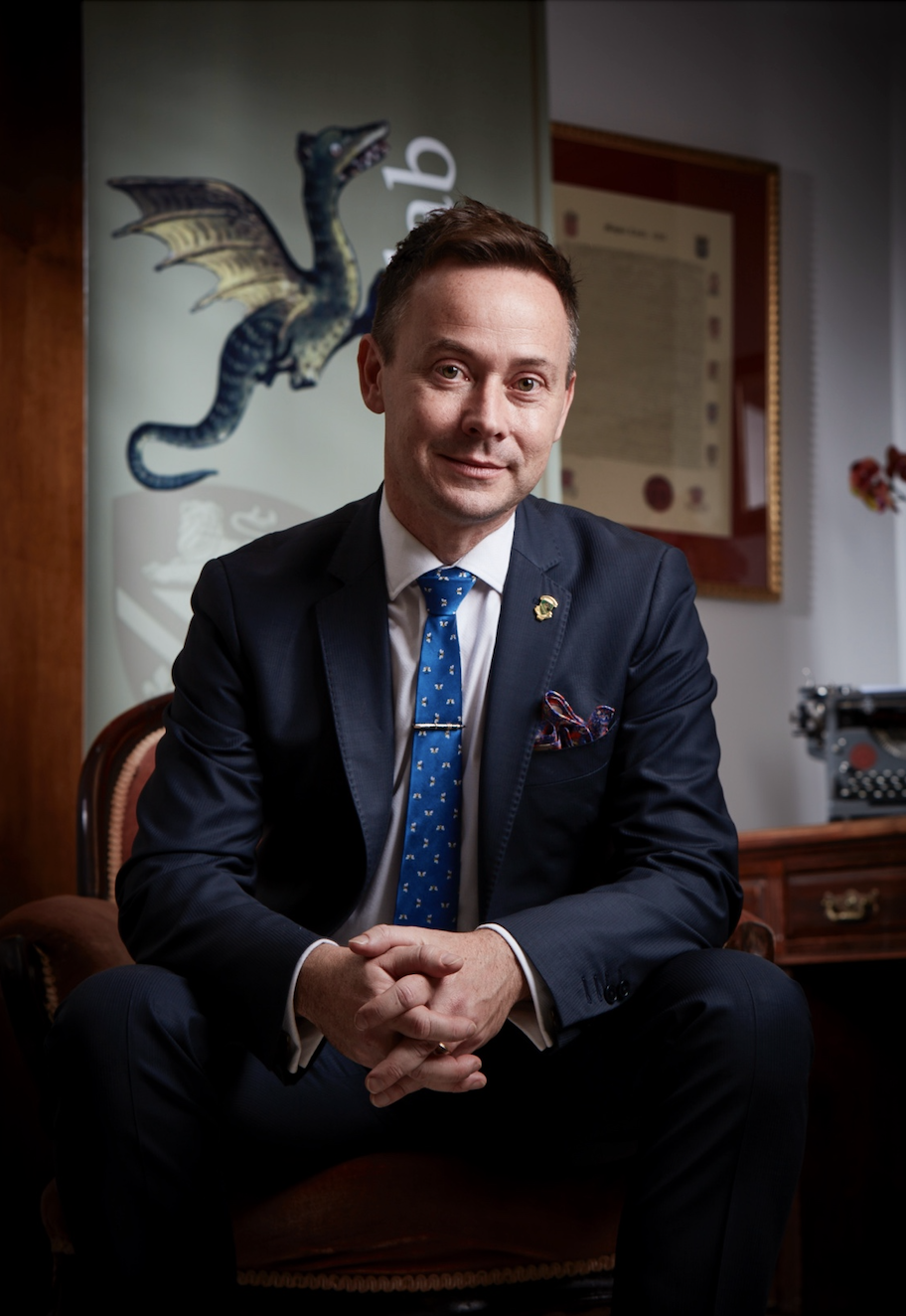
- Bednarski in 2019
- Born: 1973 (age 52–53); Montreal, Quebec, Canada

Steven Bednarski (born 1973) is a Canadian historian of the Middle Ages who specializes in fourteenth-century environment, crime, sex, gender, and microhistory. He is notable for being awarded an exceptionally high level of public research funding and for piloting a trans-disciplinary international research partnership network. As a child, Bednarski also worked in Montreal, Quebec and Toronto, Ontario as an actor.

== Early life and education ==
Steven Bednarski was born in 1973 to Anglophone parents in Montreal. His mother was a homemaker and his father a secondary school mathematics teacher. He has two younger brothers. During his childhood, changes to the language laws of Québec meant he was part of the first generation of English-speaking Montreal school children afforded the opportunity to attend public school equally in both English and French within the then-English language Catholic School Board, the now-defunct Montreal Baldwin-Cartier English Catholic School Board.

Bednarski began his education in 1985 at Loyola High School, Montreal, a Jesuit private school for boys with a strong Liberal Arts tradition. At the time, the school still required students to study Latin for the first two years of their secondary school education. Subsequently, upon moving from Montreal to Toronto, he attended Glendon College, the bilingual (French and English) campus of York University, Toronto. There, he received an Honors Bachelor of Arts degree in History and Linguistics, and studied under Andrée Courtemanche, a French-Canadian medieval historian. After working with Courtemanche's historical records from Provence, Bednarski began his MA studies in the History Department at the University of Toronto on a full scholarship from the Province of Ontario. Upon graduation from this MA program, Bednarski attended the Université du Québec à Montréal (UQAM) where he pursued doctoral studies under the co-supervision of Michel Hébert and Andrée Courtemanche. His doctoral research was funded by the Social Sciences and Humanities Research Council of Canada (SSHRC). In the fourth and final year of his doctoral studies, Bednarski was invited to apply for, and subsequently received, a prestigious SSHRC Postdoctoral Fellowship, hosted at the Centre for Medieval Studies at the University of Toronto.

== Entertainment ==
Mr. Bednarski voiced Nobita Nobi (aka Sidney) in the Cinar English dub of Doraemon, and Chad in Sailor Moon. At the time Astro Boy was dubbed from Japanese into English, Canadian voice-over regulations did not require producers to list voice actors' credits at the end of their productions. As a result, although his voice aired for over a decade and a half on TV, VHS, and DVD, he received no official recognition for his contribution and did not receive royalties. By the time Sailor Moon aired, however, ACTRA (the Alliance of Canadian Cinema, Television, and Radio Artists) had negotiated credits for dubbing. As a result, his name does appear in the list of credits for Sailor Moon. His brothers Robert and Andrew are also actors.

He also voiced Rosey's scientific archenemies Jeffrey and Matthew in the ABC animated series Little Rosey.

His first lead role on camera was for a National Film Board of Canada short film, The Cap, where he co-starred with Michael Ironside. In 1985, he played Young Kevin in the film adaptation of Mordecai Richler's novel of the same name, Joshua Then And Now. His most notable on-camera role, however, was in the 1988 horror film, PIN, in which he played Young Leon alongside Terry O'Quinn.

== Research ==
=== Late Medieval Provençal Criminal History ===
Bednarski's MA, PhD, and Postdoctoral research was derived from and largely based upon a large-scale study of thousands of criminal registers conserved from the Provençal town of Mansoque. His PhD thesis, entitled "Crime, justice et régulation sociale à Manosque, 1340–1403" ("Crime, Justice and Social Regulation in Manosque, 1340–1403") is based on the approach of social history and looks at how ordinary people used a local municipal court to resolve disputes and advance their own agendas, even as the court worked to establish its legitimacy over daily life. This research became the basis for Bednarski's first monograph, Curia: A Social History of a Court, Crime, And Conflict, published through the Presses Universitaires de la Méditerranée.

=== Microhistory ===
Bednarski's forays into premodern criminal archives and his interest in social history inclined him toward microhistory, a genre of historical writing rooted in narrative tale-telling, which uses a single, telling historical "moment" to unpack a wider world. Microhistorians like Bednarski often use criminal cases which they see as examples of the "exceptional normal," instances in which boundaries are transgressed illicitly, thereby allowing them to trace the counters of the licit. Moreover, they feel that such trial records often contain a wealth of information about everyday life everyday people. This approach is rooted in the Italian tradition established and developed beginning in the 1970s by historians such as Giovanni Levi, Carlo Ginsburg, Edward Muir, and Gene Brucker. The genre famously influenced scholars of French premodern history such as Emmanuel Le Roy Ladurie and Natalie Zemon Davis.

Drawing on his most extensive criminal register from Provence, and building on research first proposed to him and initially developed by Andrée Courtemanche, Bednarski worked collaboratively with his students to write A Poisoned Past: The Life and Times of Margarita de Portu, a Fourteenth-Century Accused Poisoner, which is published through the University of Toronto Press. This, his second monograph, was the first ever pedagogical microhistory. It tells the tale of a young Provençal woman who suffered from seizures and was accused by her brother-in-law, but subsequently acquitted, of using poison or sorcery to murder her older husband. In the book, Bednarski alternates between tale-telling and interjecting his own authorial voice. He challenges the reader to consider his own role in shaping the narrative and plays with different historical interpretations of the source material.

A Poisoned Past was widely reviewed and well received by critics. Its approach and success helped secure for him in 2017 the international D2L Award for Innovation in Teaching and Learning from the Society for Teaching and Learning in Higher Education.

=== Late Medieval Environmental History ===
In 2012, Bednarski conducted a sabbatical abroad as Scholar in Residence at Queen's University's Bader College at Herstmonceux Castle. There, in a partnership he negotiated between his own institution, Bader College, and Queen's University, he developed a proposal for a research partnership that began to explore the relationship between climate change, land use, and settlement on the Herstmonceux estate. In 2013, he applied for and received four-years of seed funding in the form of a $200,000 SSHRC Partnership Development Grant (PDG). With those funds, Bednarski created a large number of training opportunities for Canadian students to live, study, and work in the UK.

Building on his initial partnership with Queen's University, Bednarski expanded his network, Environments of Change, to include an initial working group of thirty scholars and fifteen agencies (not-for-profits, educational sector partners, and private-sector partners). Environments of Change aims to find ways of using emerging digital technologies to explore the historical relationship between natural environment and human culture in late medieval England. As part of that effort, Bednarski launched Canada's first digital humanities lab dedicated to the study of climate and culture, the Medieval DRAGEN (Digital Research in Arts and Graphical Environmental Networks) Lab at St. Jerome's University in the University of Waterloo.

In April 2019, Bednarski received a SSHRC Partnership Grant valued at $2,500,000 which augments partner cash and in-kind contributions for a total initial operating value of $10,000,000.

== Career ==
Upon completing his academic formation, Bednarski taught as a contract faculty member in the History Department at York University. Between 2004 and 2006, he also worked concurrently as a high school teacher at St. Michael's College School, an elite Catholic preparatory school for boys founded by the Congregation of St. Basil and located in downtown Toronto. In 2006, he was appointed Assistant Professor of History at St. Jerome's University in the University of Waterloo. In 2011, he was tenured and promoted to Associate Professor. In 2017, he was promoted to Full Professor.

Bednarski also holds associate faculty appointments at the Centre for Medieval Studies at the University of Toronto and in the History Department at Queen's University.

== Awards and distinction ==
In addition to receiving a high level of research funding, Bednarski has won two teaching awards and other distinctions. Notably, in 2011, he was the recipient of the University of Waterloo's Distinguished Teacher Award and, in 2017, of the Society for Teaching and Learning in Higher Education's D2L Innovation Award in Teaching and Learning. In 2019, he was the recipient of the Ontario Council for University Faculty Association's (OCUFA) Lorimer Award for Collective Bargaining.
