= Kathleen Foster Campbell =

Irish-born American poet

Kathleen Foster Campbell (born 12 November 1897 in Larne, Ireland – 10 April 1991 in Fresno, California) was an Irish-born American poet. She was an early member of the University of Chicago Poetry Club.

== Life ==
Kathleen Foster was born in Larne, Ireland, and her family moved to the United States when she was a child. She attended the University of Chicago to study poetry. Through the newly formed Poetry Club, Campbell became a close friend of Janet Lewis, Elizabeth Madox Roberts and Gladys Campbell. She married Gladys' brother, Donald Campbell, an attorney. The couple lived in Chicago until Donald Campbell's retirement, when they moved to Carmel, California.

== Published work ==
- 1940: Poetry: 'Not Fragments', 'Wake'
- 1941: Poetry: Reviews 'The Gap of Brightness' by F. R. Higgins and New Zealand Poems by Eileen Duggan, Androscoggin by Marsden Hartley, Angle of Earth and Sky by David Morton, 'Two Islands', 'Time and Low Tide'
- 1949: Poetry: 'Old Letters'.
