= Simona Cerutti =

Italian historian (born 1954)

Simona Cerutti (born 24 September 1954) is an Italian historian. Since 2001 she has been Directrice d’Etudes à l’Ecole des Hautes Etudes en Sciences Sociales in Paris, and she is also Directrice responsible du Laboratoire de Démographie et Histoire Sociale (LaDéHiS) at EHESS, Paris.

== Biography ==
Cerutti attended high school in Turin. As soon as she enrolled at university, she started (by chance) to work at the Einaudi publishing house in Turin, where she was able to meet people such as Giulio Einaudi, Italo Calvino and Primo Levi. Cerutti also studied under Giovanni Levi, who introduced her to historical research and archives, and supervised her thesis. Levi coordinated a network of young researchers, beginners in historical research, who met at his house for weekly seminars of reading and discussion of texts.

In 1980, when Levi and Carlo Ginzburg began the "Microstorie" series, she edited the volumes in the publishing house. When, in 1985, she left the publishing house and enrolled in a doctorate in Paris, she continued to work alongside Levi and Ginzburg on the series.

Later, her professional life took place essentially in Paris. She did her doctorate under the direction of Maurice Aymard and Jacques Revel. She worked with Ginzburg again and curated a series at the Feltrinelli publishing company.

She was able to gain international experience, for example at the University of Florence, Cornell (Ithaca, N.Y.), Geneva and at the Columbia University in New York.

== Research ==
Cerutti was co-director (together with Carlo Ginzburg and Giovani Levi) of the Serie "Microstorie" (EInaudi, 1985-1990). 1989 she became co-director of the Journal Quaderni Storici, and 2015 a member of the research community (WOG) Urban Agency at University of Antwerp, coordinated by Bert De Munck.

Her main focus includes research on social classifications and hierarchies in early modern societies with particular attention to the culture of law in the language and in the categories of social actors. She is responsible for an international research group (Citoyenneté et propriété au nord et au sud de la Méditerranée, XVIe-XIXe siècles: 2016-2020), composed of students engaged in a comparative project on “citizenship” both in northern and the southern regions of the Mediterranean. She is developing a reflection on the future of social history and the developments of micro-historical methods. Currently she is writing a book on petitions and communication with authorities in early modern Italian societies.

She is doing research on topics of history and hierarchy as well as the social classification in European cities of the Ancien Régime. Specifically she looks at the following points:

- Communication with authorities and justice demands between the social classes during modernity
- Social and juridical classification of citizen and non-citizen
- Legal proceedings in front of court in the Ancien Régime
- Comparing history of citizenship in the north and south mediterranean.

== Works ==
- Etrangers. Etude d’une condition d’incertitude dans une société d’Ancien Régime, Bayard, Paris 2012
- Giustizia sommaria. Pratiche e ideali di giustizia in una società di Ancien Régime (Torino, XVIII secolo), Gian Giacomo Feltrinelli Editore, Milan, 2003.
- Mestieri e privilegi. Nascita delle corporazioni a Torino, secoli XVII-XVIII, (éd. italienne) Einaudi, Turin 1992.
- La Ville et les métiers. Naissance d'un langage corporatif (Turin, XVII^{e}-XVIII^{e} siècle), Editions de l'EHESS, Paris 1990.
- L’appartenance locale et propriété au nord et au sud de la Méditerranée (en collaboration avec S. Bargaoui et I. Grangaud), Cahiers de IREMAM (https://books.openedition.org/iremam/3396)
- Suppliques. Lois et cas dans la normativité de l’époque moderne(en collaboration avec M. Vallerani), Atelier du Centre des Recherches Historiques (https://acrh.revues.org/6525)
- «Fatti : storie dell’evidenza empirica», numéro monographique de Quademi Storici 108,3, 2001 (en collaboration avec G. Pomata)
- «Procedure di giustizia», numéro monographique de Quademi Storici, 101, 2, 1999, (en collaboration avec R. Ago).
- «Cittadinanze», numéro monographique de Quaderni Storici, 89, 2, 1995 (en collaboration avec R. Descimon et M. Prak)
- Conflitti nel mondo del lavoro, numéro monographique de Quaderni Storici, 80, 3, 1992 (en collaboration avec C. Poni).
