= Microhistory =

Intensive historical investigation of a well-defined smaller unit of research

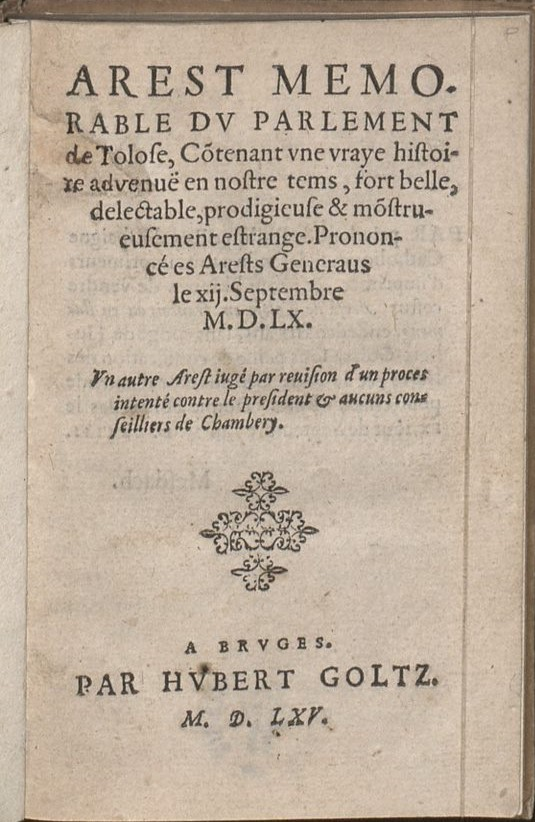
An edition of the 1560 account of the trial of the French imposter Martin Guerre who would serve as the subject for Natalie Zemon Davis's landmark The Return of Martin Guerre (1982)

Microhistory is a genre of history that focuses on small units of research, such as an event, community, individual or a settlement. According to Charles Joyner microhistory differs from case studies in that microhistory aspires to "[ask] large questions in small places". It is closely associated with social and cultural history.

== Origins ==
Microhistory became popular in Italy in the 1970s. According to Giovanni Levi, one of the pioneers of the approach, it began as a reaction to a perceived crisis in existing historiographical approaches. Carlo Ginzburg, another of microhistory's founders, has written that he first heard the term used around 1977, and soon afterwards began to work with Levi and Simona Cerutti on Microstorie, a series of microhistorical works.

The microhistorical movement gained momentum during the 1970s, a period in which macro-historical processes and social science–oriented historiography were increasingly being questioned. Emerging as a reaction against grand narratives and broad explanatory models such as Marxism, microhistory sought to shift the focus of history from dominant power centers to the margins, highlighting the experiences of "ordinary people" who had been neglected both in traditional political history and in social-scientific approaches. The Italian tradition of microstoria, shaped by figures such as Carlo Ginzburg, Giovanni Levi, Carlo Ponti, and Edoardo Grendi, became institutionally consolidated through the journal Quaderni Storici, founded in 1966.

The word "microhistory" dates back to 1959, when the American historian George R. Stewart published Pickett's Charge: A Microhistory of the Final Attack on Gettysburg, July 3, 1863, which tells the story of the final day of the Battle of Gettysburg. Another early use was by the Annales historian Fernand Braudel, for whom the concept had negative connotations, being overly concerned with the history of events. A third early use of the term was in the title of Luis González's 1968 work Pueblo en vilo: Microhistoria de San José de Gracia. González distinguished between microhistory, for him synonymous with local history, and "petite histoire", which is primarily concerned with anecdotes.

== Approach ==
The most distinctive aspect of the microhistorical approach is the small scale of investigations. Microhistorians focus on small units in society, as a reaction to the generalisations made by the social sciences which do not necessarily hold up when tested against these smaller units. For instance, Ginzburg's 1976 work The Cheese and the Worms – "probably the most popular and widely read work of microhistory" – investigates the life of a single sixteenth-century Italian miller, Menocchio. The individuals microhistorical works are concerned with are frequently those whom Richard M. Tristano describes as "little people", especially those considered heretics.

While microhistory reduces the scale of investigation, it simultaneously transforms the methodology of historical inquiry. Rather than rejecting macro-historical processes entirely, it treats them as complementary, using local studies to test broader generalizations. By placing the individual and everyday experience at the center of inquiry, microhistory seeks to restore "the human face of history." Influenced by Clifford Geertz’s concept of "thick description," microhistorians draw upon cultural anthropology to reveal the symbolic meanings embedded within historical phenomena.

Carlo Ginzburg has written that a core principle of microhistory is making obstacles in sources, such as lacunae, part of the historical account. Relatedly, Levi has said that the point of view of the researcher becomes part of the account in microhistory. Other notable aspects of microhistory as a historical approach are an interest in the interaction of elite and popular culture, and an interest in the interaction between micro- and macro-levels of history.

Microhistory also places strong emphasis on narrative, viewing the historian's process of research and perspective as integral to the narrative itself. In doing so, microhistorians distinguish themselves from radical postmodern approaches by maintaining a commitment to factual historical reality.

Since the 2010s, historical research has expanded to include the field of "global microhistory," which seeks to combine the detailed focus of microhistorical studies with broader transregional or global perspectives.

== See also ==
- Alltagsgeschichte
- English local history
- History from below
- Category:Microhistorians
- Macrohistory
- One-place study

=== Notable microhistorians ===
- Wolfgang Behringer
- Robert Bickers
- Jaroslav Čechura
- Simona Cerutti
- Alain Corbin
- Robert Darnton
- Natalie Zemon Davis
- Arie van Deursen
- Clifford Geertz
- Carlo Ginzburg
- Luis González y González]
- Craig Harline
- Mark Kurlansky
- Emmanuel Le Roy Ladurie
- Giovanni Levi
- Sigurður Gylfi Magnússon
- Sue Peabody
- Leslie Peirce
- Detlev Peukert
- Jacques Revel
- Guido Ruggiero
- Mimi Sheller
- Carolyn Steedman
- Jonathan D. Spence
- Alan Taylor
- Stella Tillyard
- E. P. Thompson
- Laurel Thatcher Ulrich
- Alfred F. Young

=== Notable microhistorical works ===
- The Cheese and the Worms
- Montaillou
- The Return of Martin Guerre

== General and cited references ==
- Ginzburg, Carlo (1993). "Microhistory: Two or Three Things That I Know about It". Critical Inquiry. 20 (1). Translated by Tedeschi, John; Tedeschi, Anne C. The University of Chicago Press: 10–35. doi:10.1086/448699. JSTOR 1343946. S2CID 197852979.
- Künzel, Geraldien von Frijtag Drabbe; Galimi, Valeria (2019). "Microcosms of the Holocaust: Exploring New Venues into Small-Scale Research of the Holocaust". Journal of Genocide Research. 21 (3): 335–341. doi:10.1080/14623528.2019.1631517.
- Levi, Giovanni (1991). "On Microhistory". In Burke, Peter (ed.). New Perspectives on Historical Writing. Cambridge: Polity Press. p. 254. ISBN 9780271008271 – via Google Books.
- Tristano, Richard M. (1996). "Microhistory and Holy Family Parish: Some Historical Considerations". U.S. Catholic Historian. 14 (3: Parishes and Peoples: Religious and Social Meanings, Part Two). Catholic University of America Press: 23–30. JSTOR 25154561.
