= Martin Guerre (musical) =

- Revised production logo
- Music: Claude-Michel Schönberg
- Lyrics: Alain Boublil; Edward Hardy; Stephen Clark
- Book: Alain Boublil; Claude-Michel Schönberg
- Premiere: July 10, 1996: Prince Edward Theatre, London
- Productions: 1996 West End; 1998 Madrid; 1999 Denmark; 1999 UK Tour; 1999 US Tour; 2007 Newbury, Berkshire, UK; 2026 London
- Awards: 1997 Laurence Olivier Award for Best New Musical

Martin Guerre is a two-act musical with a book by Claude-Michel Schönberg and Alain Boublil, lyrics by Alain Boublil, Edward Hardy and Stephen Clark, and music by Claude-Michel Schönberg.

Written in the operatic style similar to the creative team's previous efforts, Les Misérables and Miss Saigon, the bulk of the show is sung-through, with little spoken dialogue between the musical numbers. It failed to match the box office success of its two predecessors.

== Synopsis ==
The musical is loosely based on the real-life historical figure Martin Guerre and the 1982 film The Return of Martin Guerre he inspired, as well as the book of the same title by the social historian Natalie Zemon Davis. The story is set in early modern France in the anti-Protestant town of Artigat, where young Martin Guerre is forced into an arranged marriage with Bertrande de Rols in order to produce a Catholic heir. Martin is unsatisfied with the marriage, complicated by the fact that a childhood friend, Guillaume, is secretly in love with Bertrande. Beaten by the priests due to his failure to consummate the union, Martin abandons his home and Bertrande to fight the Protestant Huguenots, and it is during the skirmishes that he befriends Arnaud du Thil with whom he shares his history, beginning the story at this point, seven years later, in medias res. When Martin appears to die in battle, Arnaud goes to his village to inform Bertrande of her husband's death but, mistaken for the deceased soldier by the residents, he decides to play along with their error and becomes involved with Bertrande. Aware of Arnaud's deception, Bertrande decides to keep his secret and the two discover a mutual romantic attraction while Arnaud takes the name "Martin Guerre" for himself. Guillaume, who had until now hoped for a chance with Bertrande romantically, becomes envious of the supposedly returned soldier. As Bertrande, secretly converted to Protestantism, also turns Arnaud to her faith, Guillaume uncovers their beliefs and so they are assaulted by a roused mob. Before Arnaud is killed, however, Benoit, the knowing village idiot, reveals that he is not truly Martin Guerre, but rather, an imposter. The authorities arrest Arnaud—still claiming that he is Martin—under charges of deception and at the end of the trial, Martin Guerre himself, having apparently survived the war, appears as the last witness. In prison, Arnaud, however, is freed by Martin who forgives him for stealing his identity, noting the legitimacy of Arnaud and Bertrande's love for each other. The mob, though, sets the town ablaze and Guillaume stabs Arnaud before he can escape. He then tries to kill Martin, hoping to take Bertrande for himself, and is killed in the struggle. As Arnaud dies in Bertrande's arms, Martin and Bertrande sing mournfully about love and the two part for good. The town contemplates their own xenophobic actions remorsefully.

The musical makes several changes to earlier versions of the story, including its focus on the French Wars of Religion, which were especially prominent in the original 1996 version. Unlike the 1982 film, the earliest version of the musical made it clear from the outset that Bertrande de Rols was complicit in Arnaud's imposture. Sally Barnden of Swansea University has argued that this choice reflected the 1990s context and the interest in giving agency to disempowered women.

== Productions and background ==
When first approached by Schönberg and Boublil, Cameron Mackintosh, who had produced their earlier works, expressed little interest in producing the project as it existed. Only after several dramatic revisions, in which the character of Guerre became more heroic and greater emphasis was placed on the theme of religious intolerance, did he become enthusiastic about its potential.

=== London (1996–1998) ===
Six years in the making, Mackintosh's $6 million West End production, directed by Declan Donnellan and choreographed by Bob Avian, with lyrics by Edward Hardy, opened on July 10, 1996 at the Prince Edward Theatre. In the early weeks, the creative team continued to clarify the narrative, rearrange material, and remove one nonessential song.

While the cast continued to perform the show, the creative team – now augmented by additional lyricist Clark – rewrote large portions of the book, adding new scenes and songs, shortening the beginning, providing a happier ending, and shifting the focus to Bertrande. In order to make more radical changes, the show closed from October 28–31, 1996, and the production was completely revised. This revised version opened after a week of previews on November 11, 1996. The critical response was significantly improved, and the revised show went on to win the 1997 Laurence Olivier Award for Best Musical and Best Choreography.

In June 1997, further changes were made to the production to coincide with the cast change. The production closed on February 28, 1998 after 675 performances.

=== UK tour (1999) ===
The West Yorkshire Playhouse in Leeds was the new home for a completely rewritten version of Martin Guerre. Artistic Director Jude Kelly invited the writers Alain Boublil and Claude-Michel Schonberg to rework their musical there, and in a co-production between the West Yorkshire Playhouse and Cameron Mackintosh, Martin Guerre opened on December 8, 1998. The libretto was rewritten extensively, a number of new songs were added, and many of the original tunes were retitled, repositioned, and/or were given new lyrics. The physical production was trimmed considerably to make it more intimate. In addition, the logo was changed from the original red to a black background.

It then embarked on a national tour which ended in Bristol on August 7, 1999 after 227 performances. The tour also played Newcastle, Glasgow, Aberdeen, Norwich, Edinburgh, Manchester, Birmingham, Llandudno, Nottingham and Plymouth.

=== US tour (1999–2000) ===
The North American premiere was at the Guthrie Theater in Minneapolis on September 29, 1999, for an 8-week engagement. Artistic Director Joe Dowling welcomed the opportunity for a co-production between the Guthrie Theater and Cameron Mackintosh so that Martin Guerre could be fine-tuned for its first American audience.

Some musical numbers were moved and there was a general softening of the village characters to make them more likable and more individualized. According to Mackintosh "Forty percent of the current material was not in the original." The production starred Hugh Panaro, Erin Dilly and Stephen R. Buntrock in the US tour in 1999–2000. The tour played Minneapolis, Detroit, Washington, Seattle and Los Angeles.

A planned Broadway opening never materialized.

=== Denmark (1999–2000) ===
A licensed production of Martin Guerre opened at the Odense Theater in Denmark on December 30, 1999 and it ran until March 6, 2000.

=== Newbury (2007) ===
A revival of the musical at the Watermill Theatre near Newbury, England, ran in July 2007. There was a company of 12 actor/musicians, starring Andrew Bevis and directed by Craig Revel Horwood. Based largely on the London version that had premiered in November 1996, there were further lyrical changes, and "Live With Somebody You Love" from the touring version was inserted into the score. This production made additional changes to the premise of the previous versions of the musical; Bertrande does not (appear to) know that the imposter is not her returning husband until the court scene in Act 2. The character of Martin was made far more hostile in this version. This production also had more spoken dialogue, a conscious decision made by the composers, who reworked the show whilst they were in rehearsals for The Pirate Queen.

=== London revival (2026) ===
Schönberg and Boublil revealed in an interview with The Age that Martin Guerre is being modified “very extensively” after the duo revisited the show during the COVID-19 lockdown, after producer Cameron Mackintosh returned the rights to the musical back to the pair. Lyricist Annabel Mutale Reed and librettist Paul Hodge are said to have joined them. Boublil said: “Maybe by giving us that new freedom, we also felt able to look into ourselves and find new possibilities. Claude-Michel has come up with some unexpected music that would not have been in Martin Guerre 15 years ago and I have come up with, I hope, some new psychology and new ideas.”

On 11 June 2026, it was announced that The Old Vic will present a semi-staged "radically reworked" revival of the musical in the round in October 2026, developed and directed by Matthew Warchus, designed by Rob Howell and choreographed by Lizzi Gee.

== Songs ==
=== 1996 West End (original July version) ===
- "Prologue"
- "Artigat"
- "Over A Year"
- "Charivari"
- "Why Won't You Love Me?"
- "The Rejection"
- "Martin Guerre"
- "Here Comes the Morning"
- "A Life For A Life"
- "Sleeping On Our Own"
- "The Confession"
- "Louison/Now You've Come Home"
- "Tell Me to Go"
- "The Seasons"
- "All I Know"
- "The Conversion"
- "Bethlehem"
- "The Dinner"
- "Louison (reprise)"
- "One By One"
- "The Capture"
- "All I Know (reprise)"
- "Entr'acte"
- "Halleluja"
- "Bethlehem"
- "Me"
- "Martin Guerre" (Reprise)
- "Someone"
- "The Imposters"
- "The Last Witness"
- "Here Comes The Morning (reprise)"
- "The Sentence"
- "I Will Make You Proud"
- "The Madness"
- "All I Know/A Life For A Life (reprise)"
- "The Escape"
- "The Reckoning"
- "The Land Of Our Fathers"

=== 1996 West End (December revision) ===
- "Prologue"
- "Pray For The Day"
- "Working On The Land"
- "Where's The Child?"
- "The Rejection"
- "Martin Guerre"
- "The Battlefield/Here Comes the Morning"
- "Sleeping On Our Own"
- "Duty"
- "When Will Someone Hear?"
- "Louison/Welcome Home"
- "Tell Me to Go"
- "Louison (reprise)"
- "The Seasons"
- "All I Know"
- "Bethlehem"
- "The Dinner"
- "One By One"
- "All I Know (reprise)"
- "Entr'acte"
- "The Courtroom"
- "Me"
- "Martin Guerre" (Reprise)
- "Someone"
- "The Imposters"
- "The Last Witness"
- "Here Comes The Morning (reprise)"
- "The Sentence"
- "I Will Make You Proud"
- "The Madness"
- "The Jail"
- "The Reckoning"
- "The Land Of Our Fathers/Working On The Land (reprise)"

=== 1997 West End (June revision) ===
- "Prologue"
- "Working On The Land"
- "Where's The Child?"
- "Martin Guerre"
- "The Battlefield/Here Comes the Morning"
- "The Solution"
- "Duty"
- "When Will Someone Hear?"
- "Louison/Welcome Home"
- "Tell Me to Go"
- "The Seasons"
- "Louison (reprise)"
- "All I Know"
- "Bethlehem"
- "The Dinner"
- "One By One"
- "All I Know (reprise)"
- "Entr'acte"
- "The Courtroom"
- "Me"
- "Martin Guerre" (Reprise)
- "Someone"
- "The Imposters"
- "The Last Witness"
- "Here Comes The Morning (reprise)"
- "The Sentence"
- "I Will Make You Proud"
- "The Madness"
- "The Jail"
- "The Reckoning"
- "The Land Of Our Fathers/Working On The Land (reprise)"

=== 1999 UK/US tour ===
- "Prologue"ψ
- "Live with Somebody You Love"ψ
- "Your Wedding Day"ψ
- "The Deluge"ψ
- "I'm Martin Guerre"ψ
- "Without You as a Friend"ψ
- "Death Scene"ψ
- "The Conversion"
- "God's Anger"ψ
- "How Many Tears"ψ
- "Dear Louison"
- "Welcome to the Land"ψ
- "The Confession"
- "The Seasons Turn"
- "Don't"ψ
- "All the Years"
- "The Holy Fight"ψ
- "The Dinner"
- "The Revelation"ψ
- "The Day Has Come"ψ
- "If You Still Love Me"
- "The Courtroom"ψ
- "Who?"ψ
- "I'm Martin Guerre"ψ (Reprise)
- "All That I Love"ψ
- "The Imposter is Here"ψ
- "The Final Witness"ψ
- "The Verdict"ψ
- "Justice Will Be Done"ψ
- "Benoit's Lament"
- "Why?"ψ
- "The Burning"ψ
- "The Killing"ψ
- "You Will Be Mine"
- "How Many Tears"
- "Live with Somebody You Love"ψ (Reprise)

ψ - Songs included on the UK Tour Cast Album

For the US tour, the positioning of the songs "Live with Somebody You Love" and "Without You as a Friend" were swapped, and "The Day Has Come" had re-written lyrics and was titled "Alone".

=== 2007 Newbury production ===
- "Overture"
- "Working On the Land"
- "Where's the Child"
- "Martin Guerre" (new lyrics)
- "Here Comes the Morning"
- "Sleeping On Our Own"
- "Duty"
- "When Will Someone Hear?"
- "Louison - Someone As Beautiful As Her?"
- "Thank God You're Here"¥
- "What Do I Say?"Ŧ
- "The Seasons"
- "Live with Somebody You Love"
- "Bethlehem"
- "The Dinner"
- "One by One"
- "Live with Somebody You Love" (Reprise)
- "The Courtroom"
- "Martin Guerre" (Reprise) (new lyrics)
- "Someone"
- "The Imposters"
- "The Last Witness"
- "Here Comes the Morning" (Reprise)
- "The Sentence"
- "I Will Make You Proud"
- "The Jail"
- "The Reckoning"
- ¥ - Uses the tune of Welcome Home/Now You've Come Home from original London production
- Ŧ - Was "Tell Me To Go" in London and "Don't" on tour

== Casts and characters ==
Role	West End	UK tour	US tour	Newbury	Old Vic
Role	1996	1999	1999-2000	2007	2026
Martin Guerre	Matt Rawle	Stephen Weller	Hugh Panaro	Andrew Bevis	Alex James Hatton
Arnaud du Thil	Iain Glen	Matthew Cammelle	Stephen R. Buntrock	Ben Goddard	Shane O'Riordan
Bertrande de Rols	Juliette Caton	Joanna Riding	Erin Dilly	Kelly O'Leary	Liv Andrusier
Young Bertrande	-	-	-	-	Bethan Louise Honer
Guillaume	Jerome Pradon	Maurice Clarke	Jose Llana	Jez Unwin	Barney Wilkinson
Benoit	Michael Matus	Terry Kelly	Michael Arnold	Johnson Willis	Colin Ryan
Hortense	Ann Emery			Karen Mann	
Jeanne	-		Amy Bodnar	-	
Andre	Nathan Harmer	Jonathan Penton	Alvin Crawford	Kit Orton	
Pierre Guerre	Martin Turner	Michael Bauer	John Leslie Wolfe	James Trahern	Matthew Craig
Madame de Rols	Susan Jane Tanner	Kerry Washington	Kathy Taylor		Caroline Sheen

== Awards and nominations ==
=== Original London production ===
Year	Award	Category	Nominee	Result
1997	Laurence Olivier Award	Best New Musical		Won
1997	Laurence Olivier Award	Best Actor in a Musical	Iain Glen	Nominated
1997	Laurence Olivier Award	Best Theatre Choreographer	Bob Avian	Won
1997	Laurence Olivier Award	Best Lighting Design	David Hersey	Nominated
