= Peter Boyle (film editor) =

English film editor

- Born: 27 May 1946 (age 80); Formby, England
- Occupation: Film editor

Peter Boyle (born 27 May 1946) is an English film editor with more than 30 feature film credits. His work on the film The Hours (2002) was nominated for the Academy Award, the BAFTA Award, and the ACE Eddie, and other honors.

Boyle is a graduate of Bradfield College, and began his career working with director Richard Lester. After more than a decade of work as an assistant on feature films and editing commercials, his first credit as editor of a feature film was for McVicar in 1980. He has worked regularly on features and television films since then. From 1988 through 2006, Boyle edited five of the films directed by Kevin Reynolds.

Boyle has been elected as a member of the American Cinema Editors.

Boyle's editing of The Hours (directed by Stephen Daldry, 2002) was honored with numerous nominations for "best editing" of 2002 films. Critic Bob Grimm wrote that the film's editing "is a minor film miracle". Karen Pearlman selected the film as a case study for her 2016 book on film editing, Cutting Rhythms: Intuitive Film Editing.

== Filmography ==
This filmography is based on the listing on the Internet Movie Database; the director of each film is listed in parentheses.

- 1980 - McVicar - (Tom Clegg)
- 1981 - Inseminoid - (Norman J. Warren)
- 1982 - G'olé! - (Tom Clegg)
- 1982 - Countryman - (Dickie Jobson)
- 1982 - Witness for the Prosecution (TV) - (Alan Gibson)
- 1983 - Fanny Hill - (Gerry O'Hara)
- 1984 - The Razor's Edge - (John Byrum)
- 1985 - Morons from Outer Space - (Mike Hodges)
- 1986 - Whoops Apocalypse - (Tom Bussmann)
- 1986 - Clockwise - (Christopher Morahan)
- 1987 - A Prayer for the Dying - (Mike Hodges)
- 1988 - The Beast of War - (Kevin Reynolds)
- 1989 - Queen of Hearts - (Jon Amiel)
- 1990 - Tune in Tomorrow... - (Jon Amiel)
- 1991 - Robin Hood: Prince of Thieves - (Kevin Reynolds)
- 1992 - Into the West - (Mike Newell)
- 1993 - Sommersby - (Jon Amiel)
- 1994 - Rapa-Nui - (Kevin Reynolds)
- 1995 - Waterworld - (Kevin Reynolds)
- 1996 - Twelfth Night: Or What You Will - (Trevor Nunn)
- 1997 - The Postman - (Kevin Costner)
- 1998 - Still Crazy - (Brian Gibson)
- 1999 - Accelerator - (Vinny Murphy)
- 2000 - Quills - (Philip Kaufman)
- 2002 - The Hours - (Stephen Daldry)
- 2004 - Twisted - (Philip Kaufman)
- 2005 - Derailed - (Mikael Håfström)
- 2006 - Tristan + Isolde - (Kevin Reynolds)
- 2007 - Flawless - (Michael Radford)
- 2007 - 1408 - (Mikael Håfström)
- 2010 - Shanghai - (Mikael Håfström)
- 2011 - The Thing - (Matthijs van Heijningen Jr.)
- 2012 - I, Anna - (Barnaby Southcombe)
- 2014 - The Forger (Philip Martin)
- 2014 - Elsa & Fred - (Michael Radford)
- 2018 - Wildling - (Fritz Böhm) as Creative Consultant
