= The Return of Martin Guerre =

- Directed by: Daniel Vigne
- Written by: Daniel Vigne; Jean-Claude Carrière; Natalie Zemon Davis
- Produced by: Daniel Vigne
- Starring: Gérard Depardieu; Nathalie Baye
- Cinematography: Andre Neau
- Edited by: Denise de Casabianca
- Music by: Michel Portal
- Distributed by: European International
- Release date: 14 May 1982
- Running time: 122 min
- Country: France
- Language: French

The Return of Martin Guerre (French: Le Retour de Martin Guerre) is a 1982 French historical drama film directed by Daniel Vigne, and starring Gérard Depardieu and Nathalie Baye. It was based on a case of imposture in 16th century France, involving Martin Guerre, a French peasant and ex-soldier.

== Synopsis ==
The film relates the historical case of Martin Guerre, who leaves his young wife in a small French village to go fight in a war and to travel. Eight or nine years later, Martin (played by Depardieu) returns to resume his life. The man initially is acknowledged and welcomed by the wife, family, and friends because he knows the intimate details of his former life.

As time passes, however, vagabonds identify Martin as Arnaud of the neighbouring village of Tilh, but the villagers dismiss these claims as lies. But when Martin makes a demand for money he's owed by his uncle, the uncle is outraged and attacks Martin. This leads to a trial on his identity, with his life at stake, since if he is not Martin, he and Martin's wife Bertrande are adulterers and their child a bastard. This trial constitutes most of the film.

Martin argues well, and the villagers are divided on whether the man is in fact Martin, Bertrande siding with him. After several elevations of the proceedings up to a court in the Parlement, the judge, Jean de Coras, prepares to acquit Martin primarily on the strength of the testimony of Bertrande.

At the last minute, another witness appears in court, bearing an even stronger resemblance to the young Martin and casting everything into doubt once more. The impostor confesses that he was a soldier with the real Martin, who said he was never going back to his village, upon which the impostor decided to take his place. Even Bertrande changes her mind and says the new witness is Martin. Arnaud is sentenced to death.

Some time later, De Coras visits the village to tell Bertrande that she has been acquitted and is innocent of conspiracy with Arnaud. But he has deduced that she recognized the impostor from the very beginning and asks her why she claimed he was Martin. She says that he was a better husband and man, and they had a good life together. De Coras asks her then why she changed her mind at the last minute. She says she saw in Arnaud's eyes that the case had become hopeless and that he wanted her to feign ignorance so as to live for herself and her children.

Arnaud is led to the gallows, repenting all the while. A voiceover closes the historical framework by mentioning that de Coras was executed some years later for his Protestant beliefs.

== Production ==
The film was shot in Rieux-Volvestre (Haute-Garonne), Balaguères (Ariège) and at the Palace of the Kings of Majorca in Perpignan and the Fort de Salses in Salses-le-Château (Pyrénées-Orientales).

== Reception ==
The Return of Martin Guerre was nominated for Best Foreign Language Film by the U.S. National Board of Review of Motion Pictures. Anne-Marie Marchand was nominated for the Academy Award for Best Costume Design in 1984 for her work in this film.

On review aggregator website Rotten Tomatoes, the film holds an approval rating of 100% based on 16 reviews, with an average rating of 8.1/10.

== Book ==
In 1983, a book of the same name was published by Natalie Zemon Davis, an American-Canadian historian of early modern France and professor at Princeton University. She had served as a consultant and helped write the screenplay for the film.

== Remakes and musical ==
Sommersby is a 1993 Hollywood remake of the film in English, transposed to the American Civil War and starring Richard Gere and Jodie Foster.

A West End (London) musical produced by Cameron Mackintosh, Martin Guerre, was loosely based on the film with additional material from historical accounts. Again, the historical setting is transposed, in this case to the period of religious turmoil between the Huguenots and the Catholics in sixteenth-century France.

The first feature film from East Timor, A Guerra da Beatriz (Beatriz's War) was released in 2013. It is a re-telling of the story of Martin Guerre, but set in the 1980s, during the Indonesian occupation of East Timor. It stars Irim Tolentino, who co-wrote the script with the director, Bety Reis.

== Cast ==
- Gérard Depardieu - "Martin Guerre" (Arnaud du Tilh)
- Nathalie Baye - Bertrande de Rols
- Maurice Barrier - Uncle Pierre Guerre
- Bernard-Pierre Donnadieu - Martin Guerre
- Isabelle Sadoyan - Catherine Boëre
- Rose Thiéry - Raimonde de Rols
- Chantal Deruaz- Jeanne
- Maurice Jacquemont - Judge Rieux
- Roger Planchon - Jean de Coras
- Dominique Pinon - Antoine
- Philippe Babin - Jacques
- Valérie Chassigneux - Guillemette
- Adrien Duquesne - Sanxi Guerre
- Tchéky Karyo - Augustin

== Awards ==
- Nominee: Best Costume Design Academy Award (Anne-Marie Marchand)
- Nominee: Best Foreign Language Film BAFTA award
- Winner: Best Original Screenplay César Award (Jean-Claude Carrière, Daniel Vigne)
- Winner: Best Music Cesar Award (Michel Portal)
- Winner: Best Production Design Cesar Award (Alain Negre}
- Nominee: Most Promising Actor Cesar Award {Dominique Pinon)
- Winner: Best Foreign Film National Board of Review
- Winner: Best Actor National Society of Film Critics (Gérard Depardieu)
- Winner: Best Foreign Film Kansas City Film Critics Circle

== See also ==
- Middle Ages in film
- Microhistory

== Bibliography ==
- Davis, Natalie Zemon. The Return of Martin Guerre. Cambridge: Harvard University Press, 1983. ISBN 0-674-76691-1
- Lewis, Janet. The Wife of Martin Guerre. Swallow Press, 1967. ISBN 978-0804003216.
