= Sommersby =

1993 film by Jon Amiel

- Theatrical release poster
- Directed by: Jon Amiel
- Screenplay by: Nicholas Meyer; Sarah Kernochan
- Story by: Nicholas Meyer; Anthony Shaffer
- Based on: The Return of Martin Guerre by Daniel Vigne; Jean-Claude Carrière; Natalie Zemon Davis
- Produced by: Arnon Milchan; Steven Reuther
- Starring: Richard Gere; Jodie Foster; Bill Pullman; James Earl Jones
- Cinematography: Philippe Rousselot
- Edited by: Peter Boyle
- Music by: Danny Elfman
- Production companies: Le Studio Canal+ Regency Enterprises; Alcor Films
- Distributed by: Warner Bros.
- Release date: February 5, 1993
- Running time: 113 minutes
- Countries: United States; France
- Language: English
- Budget: $30 million
- Box office: $140 million

Sommersby is a 1993 period romantic drama film directed by Jon Amiel from a screenplay by Nicholas Meyer and Sarah Kernochan, adapted from the historical account of the 16th-century French peasant Martin Guerre. Based on the 1982 French film The Return of Martin Guerre, the film stars Richard Gere and Jodie Foster, with Bill Pullman, James Earl Jones, Clarice Taylor, Frankie Faison, and R. Lee Ermey in supporting roles. Set in the Reconstruction era, it depicts a farmer returning home from the American Civil War, with his wife beginning to suspect that he is an impostor while also falling in love with him.

Sommersby was released in the United States on February 5, 1993, by Warner Bros. The film received generally positive reviews from critics, who praised the performances and chemistry of its lead actors, as well as Danny Elfman's musical score, and was a box office success, grossing over $140 million worldwide on a budget of $30 million.

== Plot ==
Wealthy planter John "Jack" Robert Sommersby left his farm to fight as a Confederate officer in the early days of the American Civil War and is presumed dead after six years. Despite the hardship of working their farm in Vine Hill, Tennessee, his apparent widow, Laurel, is content in his absence, free from an unpleasant and abusive husband. She makes remarriage plans with one of her neighbors, Orin Meacham, who has been helping her and her young son with the farmwork.

One day, Jack seemingly returns with a change of heart. While originally hesitant, Laurel begins to warm to his now kind and loving demeanour towards herself and their son, Rob. Jack finds the local economy ruined, and his land mortgaged and exhausted. To revive the economy, he suggests Burley tobacco as a cash crop. He persuades the townsfolk to pool their resources to buy seed, offering them to share-crop on his land, and to sell them their plots at a fair price once the mortgage is cleared. Jack also offers former slaves the opportunity to purchase the land they agree to help work on, causing animosity from several white citizens.

Upon taking the townspeople's money, he buys the tobacco seed, claiming that the crops will raise enough funds to rebuild the town church. All those who bought in on the deal set to work, transforming the plantation into a breeding ground of promise and prosperity.

Displaced from his courtship of Laurel, Meacham suspects Jack to be an impostor. The town shoemaker also finds that this man's foot is two sizes smaller than the last shoe made for Sommersby before the war.

In the evenings, Jack reads to them from Homer's Iliad, which the old Jack would never have done. He claims that the book was given to him by a man he met in prison. Jack and Laurel rekindle their intimacy, which leads to Laurel becoming pregnant.

Joseph, a black freedman living on Sommersby's land, is brutally attacked and brought to Sommersby's door by hooded night riders from the town proclaiming themselves the Knights of the White Camelia (one of them is Meacham). Jack is threatened in an attempt to force him to exclude black people from the landowning, but he refuses. Meacham threatens Jack and Laurel and attempts to set fire to the barn on their property before Jack stops him. Laurel gives birth to a daughter, Rachel.

Shortly after Rachel's baptism, two U.S. Marshals arrest Jack on the charge of murder, which carries the death penalty. Laurel's attempts to save her husband focus on the question of his identity: whether this "Jack" is who he claims to be, or a lookalike who met the real Sommersby whilst in prison after deserting the Confederate Army. Laurel and Jack's lawyer agrees to argue that her husband is an impostor. This would save him from hanging for murder, but he would still be imprisoned for fraud and military desertion. Meacham devises this plan in exchange for Laurel promising to marry him upon "Sommersby's" imprisonment.

Jack fires the lawyer and sets about re-establishing himself as the real Sommersby. Several witnesses are brought up to discredit this Sommersby as a fraud; they state that he is Horace Townsend, an English teacher and con artist from Virginia. One witness says that the man currently posing as Jack defrauded his township of several thousand dollars after claiming he wanted to help rebuild the schoolhouse there. He is also said to have deserted the Confederate Army after the 1862 Battle of Antietam and ended up a prisoner of war after being captured by Union soldiers while attempting to hide from the battle. Sommersby discredits the man's testimony by identifying him as one of the Klansmen who had threatened him earlier. He points out that Orin Meacham was another of those men and that this is all a set-up to try to rob the new black farmers of the land they have bought.

When Laurel is called as a witness, she reveals that his kind nature convinced her of his being an impostor, admitting "because I never loved him the way I love you!" Judge Barry Conrad Isaacs calls Jack to his bench to ask whether he wishes to be tried as Jack Sommersby, even if it will certainly mean death by hanging. Jack states he wants to be tried as John "Jack" Sommersby.

Jack is convicted of first-degree murder and sentenced to death by hanging. While awaiting death, Laurel asks him to tell the truth about his identity as Horace Townsend. Laurel mentions the book on Homer's works that he holds. Jack tells her the story of how a man had to share a cell with another man, who looked like they could have been brothers. After sharing a cell for four years, they came to know everything about each other.

Upon his release, Jack Sommersby killed another man, then died from a wound he got during the fight. Horace Townsend then buried Jack Sommersby, which is seen in the opening scene of the film. Horace decided to assume Jack Sommersby's identity. "Jack" (who is, in fact, Horace) concludes by saying he cannot admit his true identity because Laurel and the children would lose everything, and the newly freed slaves who had bought plots of land would lose them.

As Jack is taken to the gallows, he asks Laurel to be amongst the crowds, as he cannot "hang alone." As Jack is about to be hanged, Laurel makes her way to the front of the crowd. Jack calls for her, claiming to the executioner that he "isn't ready." She calls back to him, and the two see each other before he is executed.

The closing scenes show Laurel walking on a hill with flowers. She then kneels by the gravestone of "John Robert Sommersby" and lays the flowers down for him. It is revealed that work is being done on the steeple of the village church, as Jack had wished.

== Cast ==
- Richard Gere as John Robert "Jack" Sommersby / Horace Townsend
- Jodie Foster as Laurel Sommersby
- Brett Kelley as Rob Sommersby, Jack and Laurel's Son
- Bill Pullman as Orin Meacham
- James Earl Jones as Judge Barry Conrad Isaacs
- Lanny Flaherty as Buck
- William Windom as Reverend Powell
- Wendell Wellman as Travis
- Clarice Taylor as Esther
- Frankie Faison as Joseph
- Ronald Lee Ermey as Dick Mead
- Richard Hamilton as Doc Evans
- Maury Chaykin as Lawyer Dawson
- Ray McKinnon as Lawyer Webb
- Caileb Ryder / Caitlen Ryder as Baby Rachel

== Reception ==
=== Box office ===
The film was a box-office success, grossing over $50 million in the United States and Canada and $90 million in other markets, with a worldwide gross of $140 million against a budget of $30 million.

=== Critical reception ===
Sommersby received generally positive reviews from critics. Rotten Tomatoes gives the film an approval rating of 63% based on 27 reviews, with an average rating of 6/10. The site's consensus states: "Sommersby stumbles as a consistently compelling mystery, but typically solid work from Jodie Foster and Richard Gere fuels an engaging romance." Critics praised the acting and chemistry of the two leads, Gere and Foster, but criticized the ending of the film.

Audiences polled by CinemaScore gave the film an average grade of "A−" on an A+ to F scale.

== Stories with similar themes ==
Sommersby is based on the French film The Return of Martin Guerre, which is based on the true story of Martin Guerre.

The same basic theme was used in a 1997 episode of The Simpsons, "The Principal and the Pauper," when it turns out that Principal Seymour Skinner is actually Armin Tamzarian (a delinquent orphan from New Orleans) who assumed the identity of Sergeant Seymour Skinner when the latter was missing and assumed dead. When the real Seymour Skinner returns home, the townspeople turn against him, discovering that for all of his faults, Armin Tamzarian is actually a better "Seymour Skinner" than the real one. The episode's working title was "Skinnersby", in reference to the film.

In the 1946 British war drama The Captive Heart, the protagonist, a Czechoslovak army captain (played by Michael Redgrave), assumes the identity of a dead British officer in hopes of avoiding being returned to Dachau concentration camp.

The 1957 film The Bridge on the River Kwai has a protagonist (played by William Holden) who has assumed the rank of his dead commanding officer in the hope of receiving better treatment as a prisoner of war.

In Libel (a 1935 play and 1959 film), Sir Mark Loddon is accused of being an imposter by Buckenham, with whom he was a POW during the war. They had shared quarters with Wellney, who had borne a resemblance to Loddon and at times pretended to be him. Buckenham alleges that Loddon is in fact Wellney impersonating the baronet. Loddon sues for libel, but his case is hampered by memory loss, so that his wife, and even Loddon himself, start to doubt his identity.

In Mad Men, Richard "Dick" Whitman goes to war in Korea and his commanding officer Lt. Donald "Don" Draper is killed in an artillery barrage. With his body charred beyond recognition, Whitman switches dog tags with Draper and assumes his identity. The widow of the real Don Draper, Anna Draper, hunts him down, believing Don has run out on her. Instead, she discovers the switch, becoming a very close friend of the fake Don Draper.

In the final minutes of the Family Guy episode "Thanksgiving", another man claiming to be the real Kevin Swanson bursts in the door, claiming the other Kevin (who returned from the war after having been declared dead) is an impostor.

In season 2 episode 6 of Downton Abbey, a soldier returns from war to convalesce at Downton Abbey, which has been turned into a nursing home for wounded officers; the soldier reveals that he is actually Patrick Crawley, the heir to Downton, who was believed to have died on the Titanic. The soldier claims to have been saved from drowning, but to have suffered from amnesia until the war. He tries to start a romance with Edith, who had formerly been in love with Patrick, but the family discovers that he may be an imposter, someone who had worked with Patrick and known him well. He leaves before his identity can be established.

In the 1955 short story "Human Is" by Philip K. Dick, a wife is in a loveless marriage with a scientist. When he returns from a mission he is uncharacteristically kind to her. He is later arrested under the assumption that he is truly an imposter. The story was adapted in the science fiction anthology series Electric Dreams.
