= A Desk for Billie =

- Directed by: Irving Rusinow
- Produced by: Agrafilms for National Education Association
- Music by: William Bergsma
- Release date: 1956
- Running time: 57 minutes
- Country: United States
- Language: English

A Desk for Billie is an educational American film released by the National Education Association in 1956.

It is based on the story of Billie Davis, who grew up in a migrant family, and how she found educational opportunities. Davis' story first came to public light when her story I Was a Hobo Kid appeared in the Saturday Evening Post in December 1952.

It was directed by Irving Rusinow, whose other films included Skippy and the Three R's and Freedom to Learn. The film won a Golden Reel Award in the Education category at the Fourth Annual American Film Assembly.

== Primary cast ==
- Billie as child - Nancy Pinet
- Billie as girl - Joan Lundy
- Father - A. Carroll Edwards
- Mother - Verna Brown
- 1st teacher - Bernice Harvey
- 2nd teacher - Melva Comfort
- 3rd teacher - Peggy Greene
