= Jacques de Coras =

French poet

Jacques de Coras (1625 – 24 December 1677) was a French poet born in Toulouse. Grandson of the Huguenot jurist Jean de Coras, he was raised in the Protestant Reformed Church of France. After serving as a cadet in the military, he studied theology, and exercised the functions of a Protestant minister in Guyenne. He was, during the same time, associated with the person of Turenne, and he converted to Catholicism. He mixed to good effect his poetic studies and his religious work. He died in 1677.

== Works ==
- la Conversion de Jacques de Coras, dédiée à nosseigneurs du clergé de France; 1665, Paris, in-12.
- Jonas, ou Ninive pénitente; 1663, Paris, in-12.
- Three poems, Josué, Samson, and David, were published under the title Œvres poétiques; 1665, Paris, 1n-12.

== Sources ==
- This article, in its inaugural (Nov 2005) edition, consists largely of material translated from the article, Coras (Jacques de), in the French-language Nouvelle Biographie Général: 1860, Paris: Fermin Didot Frères. vol.xi, column 764. That article, itself, gives as a reference, Moréri, Grand dict. hist.
