= University of Chicago Poetry Club =

University of Chicago Poetry Club, a group formed in 1917 by students who wished to address the absence of modern poetry in the University of Chicago curriculum.

Members included Glenway Wescott, George Dillon, Elizabeth Madox Roberts, Yvor Winters, Llewellyn Jones, Maurice Lesemann, Maurine Smith, Janet Lewis, Gladys Campbell, and Kathleen Foster Campbell. Harriet Monroe, the founder and editor of Poetry, visited the group often. Gladys Campbell and George Dillon were among the editors of the Poetry Club's publication, The Forge: A Journal of Verse, published from 1924 to 1929.
