= Queen of Hearts (1989 film) =

- Directed by: Jon Amiel
- Written by: Tony Grisoni
- Starring: Vittorio Duse; Joseph Long; Anita Zagaria
- Cinematography: Mike Southon
- Edited by: Peter Boyle
- Music by: Michael Convertino
- Production companies: Channel 4 Films; Nelson Entertainment; TVS Television
- Distributed by: Cinecom Pictures
- Release date: October 1989
- Running time: 112 minutes
- Countries: United Kingdom; United States
- Language: English
- Box office: £107,840

Queen of Hearts is a British comedy film directed by Jon Amiel in 1989.

== Plot ==
"An epic tale of romance, revenge, and cappuccino". An Italian couple tie the knot out of love and elope to London. Four children later, they are running a café in the Italian Quarter. The story is told through the eyes of the young boy Eddie.

== Cast ==
- Vittorio Duse as Nonno
- Joseph Long as Danilo
- Anita Zagaria as Rosa
- Ian Hawkes as Eddie
- Vittorio Amandola as Barbariccia
- Eileen Way as Mama Silvlla
- Cliff Parisi as The Manager

== Production ==
A UK and US co-production, filming took place in Italy and the UK, with a mixed Italian and British cast. It was the first cinema film directed by Jon Amiel, and the first feature film written by Tony Grisoni.

== Reception ==
The film received mostly positive reviews. On Rotten Tomatoes 3 of 4 critic reviews were positive. US film critic Leonard Maltin included Queen of Hearts in his list of "Great Films You Can't Find on DVD" as well as his book "Leonard Maltin’s 151 Best Movies You’ve Never Seen", and called it an "extraordinary and unusual film about an Italian couple who lead a pleasantly quixotic life in England running a family cafe. Tony Grisoni's screenplay embraces elements of romance, humor, melodrama, mysticism and fantasy in a heady mix. Remarkable first feature for director Amiel." Roger Ebert said that it "has the same sort of magical romanticism as "Moonstruck," but in a more gentle key" and rated it 3.5 out of 4. It won the Montréal First Film Prize at the Montreal World Film Festival in 1989 (at which Vittorio Duse won the best supporting actor prize for his portrayal of Nonno in the film), and won the Grand Prix at the 1990 Festival du Film de Paris.
