= Andrew Bevis =

Australian-born actor

Andrew Bevis is an Australian-born actor known for a wide range of theatrical roles. Beginning his career as a musician, at the age of 18, Bevis was initially a musical director on the original Australian production of The Phantom of the Opera.

Bevis was offered the juvenile lead, as Barnaby Tucker, in a new Australian production of Hello, Dolly! (1994 to 1995) alongside veteran actors Jill Perryman and Till Death Us Do Part's Warren Mitchell.

Bevis has played a wide range of roles on London's West End: Romeo in Romeo and Juliet (Piccadilly Theatre), Tremont the 'Chick with a Dick' in Jerry Springer: The Opera, Marius in Les Misérables, Tobias in Sweeney Todd, Joseph Cable in South Pacific (BBC), Henrik in A Little Night Music and title role in the new production of Martin Guerre (Watermill Theatre / Cameron Mackintosh).

Bevis voiced the role of Prince Lune in the English version of Studio Ghibli's feature animation The Cat Returns alongside Anne Hathaway, Tim Curry, Elliott Gould, Kristen Bell and Cary Elwes. He also starred in the award-winning short film, Will You Love Me, co-starring Tamsin Carroll.

Andrew Bevis starred as Brad in the new Gale Edwards production of The Rocky Horror Show at the Star Theatre in Sydney and comedy theatre in melbourne.

In 2010 he toured Australia and New Zealand with Sir Michael Parkinson as his on stage pianist performing as Dudley Moore.
