= Luis González y González =

Mexican historian

Luis González y González (11 October 1925 – 13 December 2003) was a Mexican historian from San José de Gracia, Michoacán. He was an expert on the Mexican Revolution and Mexican presidentialism. He published several articles in prestigious Spanish-language journals such as Historia de América, América Indígena, Vuelta, Nexos, and also Cahiers d'histoire mondiale. He was editor in chief of Historia Mexicana, a leading journal on Mexican history published by El Colegio de México, where he was a researcher and a professor for many years. He is considered a pioneer of microhistorical studies, especially for his book Pueblo en vilo (1968) about his hometown in the Western Mexican state of Michoacán.

He studied law in the Universidad Autónoma de Guadalajara and history in El Colegio de México, the National University, and Sorbonne in Paris. He was associated with the National School of Anthropology and History and the Collège de France.

He was Director of the Center for Historical Studies at El Colegio de México, founder and president of El Colegio de Michoacán and a tenured researcher at the Mexican National System of Researchers. He was a member of the Mexican Academy of History (1972-2003), the Mexican Academy of Language, and the Académie des Sciences, Agriculture, Arts et Belles Lettres in Aix-en-Provence, France. He was elected a member of El Colegio Nacional, probably the most exclusive institution of Mexican intellectuals.

He was awarded with the National Prize of History, Social Sciences and Philosophy (1983), the Great Cross of Alphonse X the Wise granted by the Spanish king Juan Carlos I (1999), an honorary doctorate by the Michoacán University (2001), the Belisario Domínguez medal granted by the Mexican Senate (2003), and he was a scholar for the French government and the Rockefeller Foundation.

== Publications ==
- El indio en la era liberal
- El oficio de historiar
- Invitación a la microhistoria (1972)
- La magia de la Nueva España
- La querencia (1982)
- La ronda de las generaciones
- Los artífices del cardenismo (1978)
- Los días del presidente Cárdenas (1981)
- Galería de la Reforma
- Jerónimo de Mendieta. Vida y pasión
- La economía mexicana en la época de Juárez
- Nueva invitación a la microhistoria
- Pueblo en vilo. Microhistoria de San José de Gracia (1968)
- Todo es historia
- La historia académica y el rezongo del público
- Tres maneras de la crónica
- El regreso de la crónica
- El Congreso de Anáhuac (1963)
- Los balances periódicos de la Revolución Mexicana
- La tierra donde estamos (1971)
- Liberalismo triunfante (1975)
- Zamora (1978)
- Sahuayo (1979)
- Michoacán (1980)
- La ronda de las generaciones (1984)
- Los protagonistas de la Reforma y la Revolución Mexicana
- Once ensayos del tema insurgente
- Los presidentes de México ante la nación
- San José de Gracia, Michoacán
- Daniel Cosío Villegas, caballero águila de la Revolución
- Historia moderna de México (coord. Daniel Cosío Villegas) / La República Restaurada / La vida social
- De maestros y colegas
- El Liberalismo Triunfante

Matria & Patria, La revolución sutil de Luis Gonzalez" (2015), El Colegio de Jalisco/ Ariel [Jacques Lafaye edit.]
