= Julia Urquidi Illanes =

Bolivian writer (1926–2010)

Julia Urquidi Illanes (30 May 1926 – 10 March 2010) was a Bolivian writer and the basis for Aunt Julia in the novel Aunt Julia and the Scriptwriter written by her ex-husband Mario Vargas Llosa.

== Life ==
Urquidi was born in Cochabamba. She was famous as the first wife of Peruvian writer Mario Vargas Llosa (1955-1964) and as the basis for the Aunt Julia character in one of his most famous novels, Aunt Julia and the Scriptwriter. Her career included work as the Chief of Protocol in the office of the mayor of La Paz and as a personal secretary for first ladies of Bolivia.

In 1983, she published her memoir titled Lo que Varguitas no dijo (English: What Varguitas Didn't Say), in response to the production of a soap opera based on Aunt Julia and the Scriptwriter.

She died in Santa Cruz de la Sierra, aged 84.
