= Maurice Lesemann =

American poet

- Born: November 28, 1899; Chicago, Illinois, U.S.
- Died: October 2, 1981 (aged 81)
- Occupation: Poet

Maurice Tautman Lesemann (November 28, 1899 – October 2, 1981) was an American poet who worked in advertising in Chicago and Los Angeles.

Lesemann was born in Chicago, the son of Louis F. W. Lesemann, a Methodist clergyman and educator. He studied at the University of Chicago where he was president of the Poetry Club, several of whose members, including Lesemann, were published in early numbers of the magazine Poetry. Before graduating with a bachelor's degree, he traveled to New Mexico to visit Yvor Winters and Glenway Wescott, and spent some time in teaching in the town of Cerrillos. In 1919 he introduced Wescott and Monroe Wheeler, who were together for decades.

After college, Lesemann had a career in advertising, in Chicago and Los Angeles. He worked on campaigns for Sunkist, Purex, and other brands. He was named vice-president of the Foote, Cone, & Belding (FCB) agency in 1954.

Lesemann married musician and choral director Marjorie Haskin in 1926, and had at least one son. Lesemann died in 1981.

== Prizes ==
- 1920: Poetry Chicago's Young Poet's Prize
- 1923: Witter Bynner Poetry Prize
- 1927: Helen Levinson Prize
