= Karl Korte =

American classical composer (1928–2022)

Karl Richard Korte (June 23, 1928 – March 27, 2022) was an American composer of contemporary classical music.

He was born in Ossining, New York, and grew up in Englewood, New Jersey. He attended the Juilliard School, where he studied with Peter Mennin, William Bergsma, and Vincent Persichetti. He later studied composition with Otto Luening, Goffredo Petrassi, and Aaron Copland.

Korte taught at the University of Texas at Austin from 1971 to 1997 and held the rank of emeritus professor. From 1997 to 2000, he was a visiting professor at Williams College in Williamstown, Massachusetts.

He received many national and international awards for his work, including two Guggenheim Fellowships (1959 and 1970), Fulbright Awards to Italy and to New Zealand, and a Gold Medal from the Belgian Government in the Queen Elisabeth Music Competition.

He died in Dobbs Ferry, New York.

== Selected works ==
- 1957 – Fantasy for violin and piano
- 1964 – Songs of Innocence (Blake), for women's voices and piano
- 1967 – Matrix – 7 for woodwind quintet, piano and percussion. Written for the New York Woodwind Quintet
- 1968 – Aspects of Love, for SATB and piano
- 1968 – Sappho Says, for mezzo-soprano soloist with women's chorus, flute, and piano
- 1969 – Symphony No.3
- 1969 – Carols New Fashioned, for SATB and piano (optional guitar or harp)
- 1971 – Remembrances for flute and synthesized processed sound
- 1973 – Pale is This Good Prince (An Oratorio in memory of Jean Casadesus), for chorus, soprano, two pianos, percussion, and narrator
- 1982 – Music for a New Easter, for SATB chorus and brass or keyboard
- 1989 – Three Psalm Settings, for a cappella chorus
- 2000 – Viola Redux, Viola Dance for viola and piano (revised 2006)
- 2001 – Four Songs of Experience (Blake), for women's voices, SSA, and piano
- 2001 – Holy Thursday (Blake), for SATB and piano
- 2002 – SHIKI (the Four Seasons), for chorus (SATB or SSA), soloists, and accompaniment by an electronic score created from fragments of koto, percussion, and other sounds.
- 2004 – Travelogues for Duo46 (violin and guitar) and Cello (Cyprus, Te Maori, Aki)
- 2004 – 2 Makams for Duo46 (violin and guitar)
- 2005 – The Time Is: for SATB chorus, soloists, keyboard and strings. Six songs on texts ranging from the American Revolution to the Women's Suffrage Movement to contemporary settings on the subject of ecology by Eve Merriam.
- 2007 – "Virtual Voices" for Duo46 (violin and guitar) and tape
