= Violin Concerto (Bergsma) =

William Bergsma's Violin Concerto is a composition for Violin and Orchestra completed in 1965.

== Structure ==
The composition is in three movements:

1. Moderato pesante
2. Poco adagio
3. Allegro ostinato

A typical performance takes around 22 minutes

== Performance history ==
Broeker noted that the first performance took place on 18 May 1966. (Note: Edward Seferian with the Tacoma-University of Puget Sound Orchestra under William Bergsma.) Further performances by other university orchestras followed in 1968 (Note: Emanual Zetlin with the University of Washington Sinfonietta under Stanley Chapple.) and 1969 . (Note: Fredell Lack with the University of Houston Symphony under A. Clyde Roller.)

The first and to date only recording (Note: Edward Statkiewicz with the Polish Radio and Television Orchestra under Zdzislav Szostak, recorded 1969.) was released by Vox Turnabout in 1971 paired with Morton Subotnick's "Laminations" and John Eaton's "Concert Piece for Synket and Orchestra".
