= The Cap =

- Directed by: Robert A. Duncan
- Written by: writer Robert A. Duncan story Morley Callaghan
- Produced by: Andy Thomson; Robert Verrall
- Starring: Michael Ironside; Nicholas Podbrey
- Cinematography: Andreas Poulsson
- Edited by: Ginny Stikeman
- Music by: Chris Crilly
- Production company: Atlantis Films
- Distributed by: WonderWorks
- Release date: 1985
- Running time: 24 minutes
- Country: Canada
- Language: English

The Cap is a 1985 Canadian short film directed and written by Robert A. Duncan. The film is based on a short story by Morley Callaghan. The film was produced by Michael MacMillan, Seaton McLean, Janice Platt Andy Thomson. The production agencies were Atlantis Films Limited and the National Film Board of Canada.

== Plot ==
The plot centres on a young boy from Montreal named Steve (Nicholas Podbrey) who is given a baseball cap by his idol, Andre Dawson of the Montreal Expos. One day, Steve loses the cap and soon after discovers that it was found by the boy of a wealthy businessman. Steve along with his unemployed father (Michael Ironside), go to the wealthy boy's house to discuss the matter. After a long and heated debate, Steve and his father leave empty-handed.

== Reception ==
The Cap was named to the ALA Notable Children's Videos list in 1984.

== Cast ==
- Michael Ironside as Steve's Father
- Nicholas Podbrey as Steve Diamond
- Jennifer Dale as Anna Diamond
- David Connor
- Steven Bednarski as Dan Hudson
- Roger Michael as Uncle Pierre
- Andre Dawson as himself
- Duke Snider
- Dave Van Horne
- Tim Raines as himself
