= The Return of Martin Guerre (book) =

Book by Natalie Zemon Davis

- Author: Natalie Zemon Davis
- Published: 1983
- Publisher: Harvard University Press
- Pages: 162
- ISBN: 0-674-76690-3

The Return of Martin Guerre is a 1983 book by historian Natalie Zemon Davis. It is a study of the case of Martin Guerre, a famous instance of imposture in 16th-century southwestern France. Davis, a historian of the early modern period, had earlier participated in the making of the French film of the same name, released in 1982. The author states in the preface that she was inspired to write the book by her work on the film, which raised new questions for her about the case, particularly about the motivations of the people involved.

Martin Guerre, a peasant in the village of Artigat in southwestern France, abandoned his wife and child and traveled to Spain. He was later impersonated by Arnaud du Tilh (alias Pansette), a man from another village. Initially accepted by the village and Martin Guerre's wife, Bertrande de Rols, he was later accused of imposture by Guerre's uncle and tried. The truth was revealed when the real Martin Guerre returned, leading to Arnaud's execution. Davis pays particular attention to the possible motivations of Bertrande, who lived for years with the man impersonating her husband. In the author's view, Bertrande was not deceived by Arnaud but rather was his active accomplice in the deception, motivated by genuine love. Davis presents the case as an example of "self-fashioning" and conscious creation of identity by common people in Renaissance Europe.

The book reached a larger audience than most historical studies and was praised in both academic and popular publications. It has been cited as one of the best works of microhistory. It has also been criticized for making claims without adequate evidence.
