= Sigurður Gylfi Magnússon =

Icelandic historian specialising in microhistory

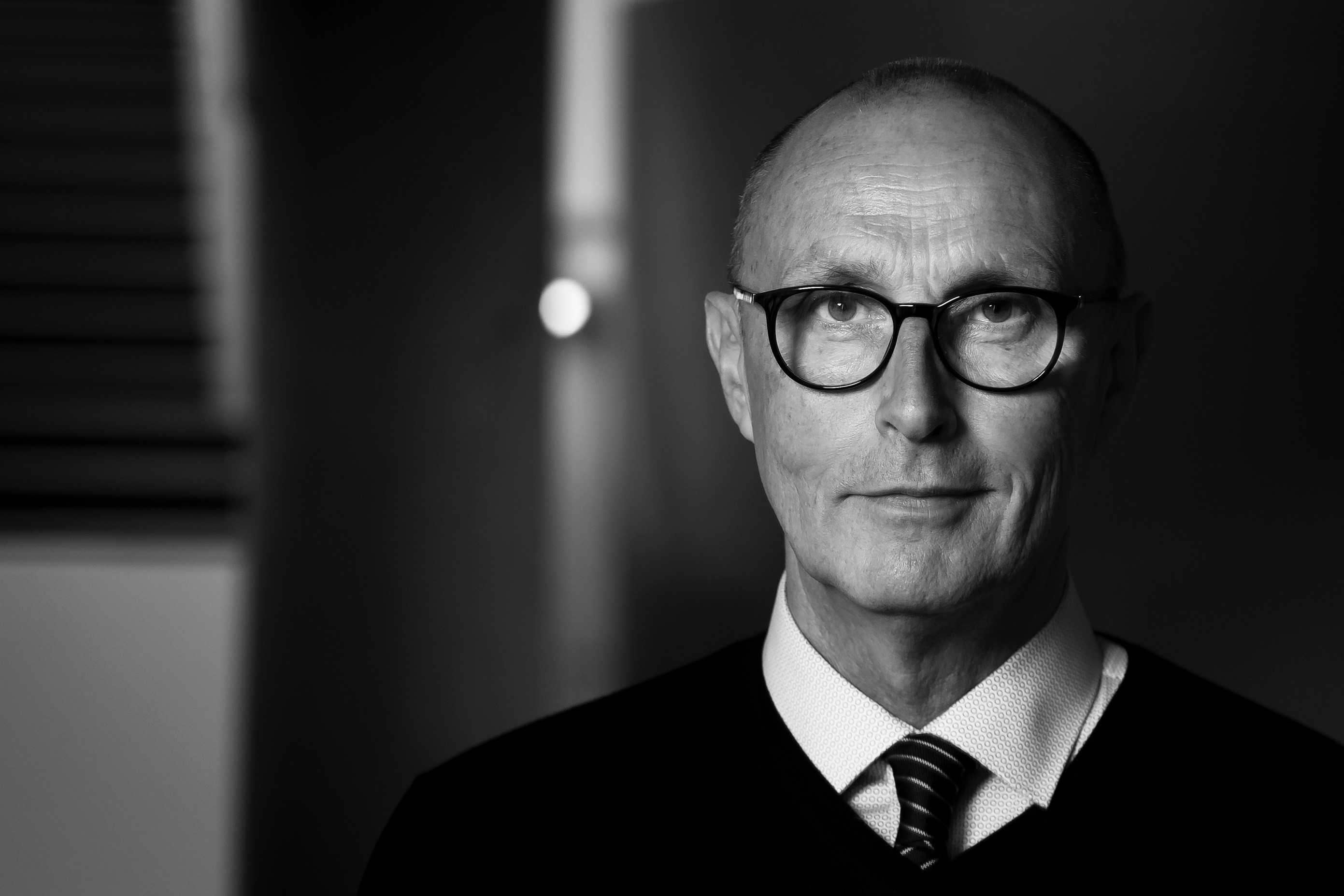
Sigurður Gylfi Magnússon

Sigurður Gylfi Magnússon (born August 29, 1957) is an Icelandic historian specialising in microhistory. He was an independent scholar from when he finished his doctoral dissertation in 1993 until 2010. He established the Center for Microhistorical Research at the Reykjavík Academy) in 2003. He got a research position at the National Museum of Iceland named after Dr. Kristján Eldjárn, the former president of Iceland and an archaeologist, in 2010 and until 2013. After that, he became a Professor of Cultural History at the Department of History at the University of Iceland.

He is married to Dr Tinna Laufey Ásgeirsdóttir, a Professor of Economics at the University of Iceland.

== Biography ==
Sigurður Gylfi Magnússon, born in Reykjavík, is an Icelandic historian specializing in microhistory, cultural history, and material culture.

He completed a B.A. in history and philosophy in 1984 at the University of Iceland. His thesis, The Mode of Living in Iceland, 1930–1940, was published in 1985 by the Institute of History at the University of Iceland. That same year, Magnússon began doctoral studies in history at Carnegie Mellon University in Pittsburgh, where he earned an M.A. in 1988 and a Ph.D. in 1993. His dissertation was titled The Continuity of Everyday Life: Popular Culture in Iceland 1850–1940.

Upon returning to Iceland in 1994, Magnússon taught part-time at the University of Iceland and other academic institutions. He also taught at Carnegie Mellon University and spent six months as a Fulbright Scholar. In 1998, he became the first chair of The Reykjavík Academy, an independent research institute founded by scholars with education from Iceland, Scandinavia, Europe, and the United States. The Reykjavík Academy grew from a forum for ten independent scholars to housing around 80 researchers across the humanities and social sciences. By the time Magnússon left the Academy in 2010, approximately 600 scholars had been associated with the community for varying periods.

In 2003, Magnússon founded and chaired the Center for Microhistorical Research, which focuses on microhistorical studies and publishes related works. He is editor of The Journal of Microhistory alongside Dr. Davíð Ólafsson. Magnússon is also the founder and one of the editors of the book series Anthology of Icelandic Popular Culture, produced in cooperation with the University of Iceland Press. The series has published more than 30 books. Other editors include Dr. Davíð Ólafsson, Dr. Sólveig Ólafsdóttir, and Dr. Bragi Þorgrímur Ólafsson.

Magnússon’s work has contributed to debates on the development of social and cultural history over the past two decades, particularly in relation to postmodernism and poststructuralism. His publications include Dreams of Things Past: Life Writing in Iceland (2004), Metastories: Memory, Recollection, and History (2005), Academic Liturgy: Humanities and the Society of Scholars (2007), and the co-edited From Re-evaluation to Disintegration: Two Final Theses, One Introduction, Three Interviews, Seven Articles, Five Photographs, One Afterword and a Few Obituaries from the Field of Humanities (2006).

In 2010, he published Wasteland with Words: A Social History of Iceland, which explores the formation of Icelandic culture from the settlement period in the ninth century through to the modern era. The book examines how Iceland developed a distinct cultural identity, how this identity evolved into the twentieth century, and how it was challenged by the 2008 financial collapse. The work combines social history with microhistorical methods to interpret the long-term development of Icelandic society.

Since becoming a professor at the University of Iceland, Magnússon has led major research projects, including My Favourite Things: Material Culture Archives, Cultural Heritage and Meaning, funded by a Grant of Excellence from the Icelandic Research Forum. The project, a collaboration across history, anthropology, archaeology, and museum and archival studies, investigates how archives preserve images of the past and document the material world. It explores the ways archives have been used in humanities and social sciences research and examines the relationships between people and objects as reflected in various archival sources. The project also analyses tensions between different types of archives and the insights these provide into Iceland’s material past.

Magnússon has delivered lectures and presentations internationally on the significance of microhistory and his research on material culture and everyday life.

== Recent articles in English ==
- "Pen, Paper and Peasants: The Rise of Vernacular Literacy Practices in Nineteenth-Century Iceland." Co-author Davíð Ólafsson. In Common Writer in Modern History. Edited by Martyn Loyon (Manchester: Manchester University Press, 2023), pp. 121–139.
- "At the Mercy of Emotions. Archives, egodocuments and Microhistory. " The Routledge Modern History of Emotions. Katie Barcley and Peter N. Stearns eds. (London: Routledge, 2022).
- "Microhistory." Routledge Handbook of Research Methods in the Study of Religion. Second Edition. Micheal Stausberg and Steven Engler eds. (London: Routledge, 2021).
- "In the Name of Barefoot Historians: In-Between Spaces within the Icelandic Educational System. "Co-author Davíð Ólafsson. Education Beyond Europe – Models and Traditions before Modernities. Cristiano Casalini, Edward Choi, and Ayenachew Woldegiyorgis eds. (Leiden: Brill, 2021).
- "The Backside of the Biography: Microhistory as a Research Tool." Fear of Theory. Biography Studies. Hans Renders and David Veltman eds. (Leiden: Brill, 2021).
- “The Devil is in the Detail: What is a ‘Great Historical Question’?” Fear of Theory. Biography Studies. Hans Renders and David Veltman eds. (Leiden: Brill, 2021).
- "One Story, One Person: The Importance of Microhistorical Research for Disability Studies." Understanding Disability Throughout History: InterdisciplinPerspectivesives in Iceland from Settlement to 1936. Edited by James Rice and Hanna Björg Sigurjónsdóttir (London: Routledge, 2021).
- "The Icelandic Biography and Egodocuments in Historical Writing. "Different Lives. Global Perspectives on Biography in Public Cultures and Societies. Biography Studies. Hans Renders and David Veltman eds., in collaboration with Madelon Nanninga-Franssen (Leiden: Brill, 2020), pp. 165–181.
- "What Takes Place, When Nothing Happens? The importance of late modern manuscript culture." Scripta Islandica 69 (2018), pp. 149–175.
- "A 'New Wave' of Microhistory? Or: It's the same old story – a fight of love and glory." Quaderni storici 155 / a.LII, n. 2, agosto 2017.
- "The Life is Never Over Biography as a microhistorical approach." The Biographical Turn. Lives in History. Hans Renders, Binne de Haan and Jonne Harmsma eds. (London: Routledge, 2017), pp. 42–52.
- "Far-reaching Microhistory: The Use of Microhistorical Perspective in a Globalized World." Rethinking History 21:3 (2017), pp. 312–341.
- "The Love Game as Expressed in Ego-Documents: The Culture of Emotions in Late Nineteenth Century Iceland." Journal of Social History 50: 1 (2016), pp. 102–119.
- "Views into the Fragments: An Approach from a Microhistorical Perspective." International Journal of Historical Archaeology 20 (2016), pp. 182–206.
- "Microhistory, Biography and Ego-Documents in Historical Writing." Revue d'histoire Nordique 20 (2016), pp. 133–153.
- "Tales of the Unexpected: The 'Textual Environment', Ego-Documents and a Nineteenth-Century Icelandic Love Story – An Approach in Microhistory." Cultural and Social History 12:1 (2015), pp. 77-94.
- "Singularizing the Past: The History and Archaeology of the Small and Ordinary." Co-author Kristján Mímisson. Journal of Social Archaeology 14:2 (2014), pp. 131–156.
- "Gender: A Useful Category in Analysis of Ego-Documents? Memory, historical sources and microhistory." Scandinavian Journal of History 38:2 (2013), pp. 202–222.
- "Living by the Book: Form, Text, and Life Experience in Iceland." In White Field, Black Seeds: Nordic Literacy Practices in the Long Nineteenth-Century. Matthew James Driscoll and Anna Kuismin eds. (Helsinki, 2013), pp. 53–62.
- "Minor Knowledge: Microhistory and the Importance of Institutional Structures." Co-author Davíð Ólafsson. Quaderni Storici 140 / a.XLVII, n.2, agosto 2012, pp. 495–524.
- "The Life of a Working-Class Woman: Selective Modernisation and Microhistory in Early 20th-Century Iceland." Scandinavian Journal of History 36:2 (2011), pp. 186–205.
- "Barefoot Historians: Education in Iceland in the Modern Period." Co-author Davíð Ólafsson. Writing Peasants. Studies on Peasant Literacy in Early Modern Northern Europe. Klaus-Joachim Lorenzen-Schmidt and Bjørn Poulsen (eds.). Landbohistorisk Selskab (Århus 2002), pp. 175–209.
- Iceland: a 20th-Century Case of Selective Modernisation. Europe Since 1914 – Encyclopedia of the Age of War and Reconstruction. Scribner Library of Modern Europe. Editors in Chief Jay Winter and John Merriman (New York, 2006).
- Iceland: Through the Slow Process of Social and Cultural Change. Encyclopedia of the Modern World. Editor in Chief Peter N. Stearns (New York: Oxford University Press, 2008).
- "The Singularization of History: Social History and Microhistory within the Postmodern State of Knowledge." Journal of Social History, 36 (Spring 2003), pp. 701–735.
- "Social History as "Sites of Memory?" The Institutionalization of History: Microhistory and the Grand Narrative." Journal of Social History Special issue 39:3 (Spring 2006), pp. 891–913.
