= Chantal Deruaz =

French actress (1949–2026)

- Born: 1949; Annecy, France
- Died: 14 June 2026 (aged 76–77); Annecy, France
- Education: Conservatoire national supérieur d'art dramatique
- Occupation: Actress

Chantal Deruaz (French: [ʃɑ̃tˈal dəʁyˈaz]; 1949 – 14 June 2026) was a French actress.

While she did appear in a small number of films, Deruaz was primarily a stage actress.

Deruaz died in Annecy on 14 June 2026.

== Filmography ==
- Diva (1981)
- Que les gros salaires lèvent le doigt ! (1982)
- The Return of Martin Guerre (1982)
- Friend of Vincent (1983)
