= The Two Dianas =

1846–1847 novel by Paul Meurice and Alexandre Dumas

The Two Dianas (French: Les Deux Diane) is a historical novel published in 1846–1847 under the name of Alexandre Dumas but mostly or entirely written by his friend and collaborator Paul Meurice. The "two Dianas" of the title refer to Diane de Poitiers (the mistress of Henry II) and her supposed daughter, Diana de Castro. The novel's setting precedes Dumas's better-known "Valois trilogy." The principal character is Gabriel, comte de Montgomery; other characters include Martin Guerre, Catherine de Médicis, and Ambroise Paré. When Meurice later published a dramatisation of the novel, a letter supposedly written by Dumas was attached as a preface, stating that he had never even read the book and that Meurice was the real author. Nevertheless, it has been argued that Dumas was at least somewhat involved in the composition of the work. According to F. W. J. Hemmings, The Two Dianas is "entirely lacking in Dumas's usual deftness of touch".
