= Aunt Julia and the Scriptwriter =

1977 novel by Mario Vargas Llosa

- First ed. cover
- Author: Mario Vargas Llosa
- Original title: La tía Julia y el escribidor
- Language: Spanish
- Published: 1977
- Publication place: Spain
- Media type: Print
- ISBN: 9788432203237
- OCLC: 925805060

Aunt Julia and the Scriptwriter (Spanish: La tía Julia y el escribidor) is the seventh novel by Nobel Prize-winning author Mario Vargas Llosa. It was published by Seix Barral, S.A., Spain, in 1977.

== Plot ==
Set in Peru during the 1950s, it is the story of an 18-year-old student, Mario or Marito Varguitas, who falls for a 32-year-old divorcee. The novel is based on the author's real-life experience.

Mario, an aspiring writer, works at a radio station, Panamericana, writing news bulletins alongside the disaster-obsessed Pascual. Mario has an aunt (married to a biological uncle) whose sister, Julia, has just been divorced and has come to live with some of his family members. He frequently sees her and though at first they do not get on, they start to go to movies together and gradually become romantically involved, ultimately getting married.

Mario's bosses also run Panamericana's sister station, which broadcasts novelas (short-run soap operas). They are having problems buying the serials in bulk from Cuba, with batches of scripts being ruined and quality being poor, and so they hire an eccentric Bolivian scriptwriter named Pedro Camacho to write the serials.

The novel chronicles the scriptwriter's rise in popularity, and subsequent descent into madness, in tandem with the protagonist's affair. It alternates between Mario's account of his life and episodes of Camacho's serials, which become increasingly unhinged as the novel progresses.

== Background ==
The novel is based in part on the author's first marriage, to Julia Urquidi. Urquidi later wrote a memoir, Lo que Varguitas no dijo (What little Vargas didn't say), in which she provided her own version of their relationship.

Vargas Llosa's novel was later adapted as a Hollywood feature film, Tune in Tomorrow, in which the setting was moved from Lima to New Orleans. The film was released as Aunt Julia and the Scriptwriter in many countries.
