= Tune in Tomorrow =

1990 film by Jon Amiel

- Theatrical release poster
- Directed by: Jon Amiel
- Written by: William Boyd
- Based on: Aunt Julia and the Scriptwriter by Mario Vargas Llosa
- Produced by: John Fiedler; Mark Tarlov
- Starring: Barbara Hershey; Keanu Reeves; Peter Falk
- Edited by: Peter Boyle
- Music by: Wynton Marsalis
- Distributed by: Cinecom Pictures
- Release date: October 26, 1990
- Running time: 107 minutes
- Country: United States
- Language: English
- Budget: $11 million
- Box office: $1,794,001

Tune in Tomorrow is a 1990 American comedy film directed by Jon Amiel. It is based on the 1977 Mario Vargas Llosa novel Aunt Julia and the Scriptwriter, and was released under that same title in many countries. Relocated from the novel's setting in 1950s-era Lima, Peru to New Orleans, Louisiana that same decade, it stars Peter Falk, Keanu Reeves and Barbara Hershey in a story surrounding a radio drama. The soundtrack for the film was composed by Wynton Marsalis, who makes a cameo appearance with various members of his band.

== Plot ==
Martin Loader works at WXBU, the local radio station, where scriptwriter Pedro Carmichael is hired. Pedro, who is known to come up with outrageous storylines that involve people in his real life, becomes a mentor figure to the younger Martin. Martin's Aunt Julia, not related by blood, returns to New Orleans after many years away and Martin falls for her. Once Pedro learns about their romance, he starts incorporating details of it into the script of his daily drama series, called "Kings of the Garden District". Soon, Martin and Julia are not only hearing about their fictional selves over the radio, but they hear about what they are going to do next.

== Cast ==
- Barbara Hershey as Aunt Julia
- Keanu Reeves as Martin Loader
- Peter Falk as Pedro Carmichael
- Bill McCutcheon as Puddler
- Dedee Pfeiffer as Nellie
- Patricia Clarkson as Aunt Olga
- Richard Portnow as Uncle Luke
- Adam LeFevre as Large Albanian Man
- Henry Gibson as Big John Coot
- Peter Gallagher as Richard Quince
- Joel Fabiani as Ted Orson
- Dan Hedaya as Robert Quince
- Buck Henry as Father Serafim
- Hope Lange as Margaret Quince
- John Larroquette as Doctor Albert Quince
- Elizabeth McGovern as Elena Quince
- Richard B. Shull as Leonard Pando
- Ray McKinnon as Cub Reporter
- Gladys Vega as Secretary
- Jack Wallace as Policeman
- The Neville Brothers as themselves

== Production ==
Principal photography began in Wilmington, North Carolina, on August 15, 1989. Hurricane Hugo damaged the film sets, so the production moved to New Orleans. Filming was wrapped by November 2.

The soap opera characters in the radio drama are voiced by the fictional WXBU employees. For instance, the fictional character "Richard Quince" is voiced by Leonard Pando, but is seen by the audience as Peter Gallagher.

== Reception ==
On Rotten Tomatoes the film has an approval rating of 50% based on 12 reviews.

Roger Ebert gave the movie 2 and a half stars out of 4, noting that "sometimes we laugh easily, sometimes uncertainly, and sometimes we just look at the screen and wonder why anyone thought that was funny." He added that though "some of the movie's best laughs come when the jaws of the listeners drop open with shock and amazement at some of Falk's more outrageous fantasies", the film's uneven comic tone remains a problem throughout the story.

Desson Thomson of The Washington Post wrote, "The movie spends too much time with the Aunt and not enough with the Scriptwriter." Rita Kempley, also of The Washington Post, was more positive about the film: "A tri-layered tale of love, creative impulses and dial-spinning, it comes and it goes, evocative and a little bit magical, flawed but forgivably so."
