= The Wife of Martin Guerre =

Novel by Janet Lewis

First edition (publ. Colt Press)

The Wife of Martin Guerre (first published 1941) is a short novel by American writer Janet Lewis based on the story of Martin Guerre, the 16th-century French peasant who apparently returned home to his wife after a long absence but was later revealed to be an impostor. The novel has its origins in research Lewis made into trials based on circumstantial evidence, after reading in-depth about famous trials turning on circumstantial evidence, which prompted her to write a pamphlet describing the risks of using it.

The novel tells the tale from the point of view of Bertrande, Martin's wife, and turns on the compelling moral problem presented to her when a man—possibly an impostor—takes the place of her husband. The first Martin is a hard, unkind person who appears not to love her whilst the second Martin is the opposite. What should she do?

At the end of the novel, her husband, the real Martin, returns, and Bertrande has to make her moral decision: does she reveal that it is not the same man, thus subjecting herself to a lifetime of misery, or does she continue the lie? She chooses the truth, yet the real Martin Guerre rejects her, saying, "Dry your tears, Madame. They cannot, and they ought not, move my pity. The example of my sisters and my uncle can be no excuse for you, Madame, who knew me better than any living soul. The error into which you plunged could only have been caused by willful blindness. You, and you only, Madame, are answerable for the dishonor which has befallen me" (Lewis, p. 107).

Lewis based her version of Martin Guerre off an account in a 1873 copy of Famous Cases of Circumstantial Evidence. That book is in turn based on Causes célèbres de tous les peuples, published by Armand Fouquier around the year 1865. Fouquier's version draws from the original account of Martin Guerre by Jean de Coras, Arrest Memorable. After reading Arrest Memorable several years later, Lewis wrote that she had gotten many details wrong and called her novel "fiction based on fact."

Lewis adapted the novel into a three-act opera libretto for William Bergsma; the resulting work was premiered at the Juilliard School on February 15, 1956.
