= Balaguères =

Commune in Occitanie, France

- Commune
- Location of Balaguères
- Location within France Location within Occitanie
- Coordinates: 42°57′02″N 1°02′40″E
- Country: France
- Region: Occitania
- Department: Ariège
- Arrondissement: Saint-Girons
- Canton: Couserans Ouest
- Intercommunality: Couserans-Pyrénées

Government
  - Mayor (2020–2026): Jean-Claude Roques
- Area^{1}: 17.84 km^{2} (6.89 sq mi)
- Elevation: 475 m (1,558 ft)
- Highest elevation: 1,253 m (4,111 ft)
- Lowest elevation: 467 m (1,532 ft)
- Population (2023): 196
  - Density: 11.0/km^{2} (28.5/sq mi)
- Time zone: UTC+01:00 (CET)
  - Summer (DST): UTC+02:00 (CEST)
- INSEE/Postal code: 09035 /09800
- ^{1} French Land Register data, which excludes lakes, ponds, glaciers > 1 km^{2} (0.386 sq mi or 247 acres) and river estuaries.

Balaguères (French pronunciation: [balaɡɛʁ]; Occitan: Balaguèras) is a commune in the Ariège department in the Occitanie region of south-western France.

== Geography ==
Balaguères is located some 4 km north-east of Audressein and 12 km south-west of Saint-Girons in the Parc naturel régional des Pyrénées ariégeoises. The north-west border of the commune is also the departmental border between Ariège and Haute-Garonne. Access to the commune is by the D618 road from Engomer in the east which passes through the south of the commune and continues south-west to Audressein. Access to the main village of Alas is by the D204A from Engomer and several local roads. The D204 goes north-west from the village through the hamlet of Agert to the hamlet of Balagué in the commune. The commune is farmland in the valley and forested on the mountain slopes.

The Lez river flows through the south of the commune and the village from south-west to east and continues east then north-east to join the Salat at Saint-Girons. The Ruisseau de Lachein flows from the north-west through the commune, gathering several tributaries, to join the Lez at the village.

== History ==
Balagué, Agert, and Alas were all part of the lordship of Aspet in the 12th century together with Engomer, Montgauch, Bareilles, and Mauvezin de Prat. This lordship became a powerful Barony in the Middle Ages. On 12 December 1642 Guy d'Encausse, Lord of Labastide (near Rieucazé) purchased Alas-Balagué and gave it to Jean-Jacques de Solan. By decree in April 1667 King Louis XIV ordered the purchase of 18 parishes that had been committed in 1642 and 1643. They all returned to the Crown lands of France. Later, however, some were sold again (Castelbiague, Pointis-Inard, Alas-Agert-Balagué). Others remained in paréage (Note: A feudal contract between two or more lords giving them equal rights) with the king: Affis (His), Arbas, Ganties, Mauvezin, Montastruc, and Rouède. The rest remained permanently in the hands of the king as sole lord: Aspet, Chein, Escaich, Estadens, Montgauch-Bareilles, and Saleich.

== Administration ==
List of Mayors

Mayors from the French Revolution to 1936

From	To	Name
1792	1793	François Antras
1793	1795	Joseph Anglade
1795	1798	Raymond Cheil
1798	1800	François Cazale
1800	1815	Joseph de Castet
1815	1818	Raymond Cheil
1818	1821	Raymond Roque
1821	1822	Joseph de Castet
1822	1830	Guillaume Joseph de Castet
1830	1835	Joseph Charles Arnaudi
1835	1837	Joseph Loze
1837	1840	Raymond Arasse
1840	1848	Antoine Cabau
1848	1853	Jean Saint-Martin
1853	1861	Raymond Roque
1861	1908	Maurice Morere
1908	1912	Raymond Anere
1912	1914	Henry Morere
1914	1919	François Gradit
1919	1920	Henry Morere
1920	1925	François Gradit
1925	1929	Pierre Lafont
1929	1936	Joseph Anglade

Mayors from 1936

From	To	Name
1936	1944	Jean Arasse
1944	1966	Pierre Founeau
1966	1977	Joseph Tignous
1977	2020	Henri Anrieu
2020	2026	Jean-Claude Roques

== Demography ==
The inhabitants of the commune are known as Balaguérois or Balaguéroises in French.

Historical population

Year	Pop.	±% p.a.
1793	1,379	—
1800	731	−8.67%
1806	919	+3.89%
1821	955	+0.26%
1831	1,289	+3.04%
1836	1,295	+0.09%
1841	1,271	−0.37%
1846	1,296	+0.39%
1851	1,308	+0.18%
1856	1,224	−1.32%
1861	1,134	−1.52%
1866	1,199	+1.12%
1872	1,097	−1.47%
1876	1,077	−0.46%
1881	1,119	+0.77%
1886	1,056	−1.15%
1891	984	−1.40%
1896	985	+0.02%
1901	895	−1.90%

Year	Pop.	±% p.a.
1906	805	−2.10%
1911	779	−0.65%
1921	643	−1.90%
1926	632	−0.34%
1931	565	−2.22%
1936	474	−3.45%
1946	425	−1.09%
1954	361	−2.02%
1962	314	−1.73%
1968	314	+0.00%
1975	267	−2.29%
1982	223	−2.54%
1990	209	−0.81%
1999	192	−0.94%
2007	195	+0.19%
2012	200	+0.51%
2017	197	−0.30%
2023	196	−0.08%

Source: EHESS and INSEE

== Culture and heritage ==
=== Cultural distinctions ===
Balaguères is one of the communes that have received the Esperanto Green Star, a distinction awarded to mayors of communes who identify with the speakers of the constructed language of Esperanto.

Balaguères was one of the filming locations for the film: The Return of Martin Guerre in 1982 with Nathalie Baye, Gérard Depardieu, and Bernard-Pierre Donnadieu.

=== Religious heritage ===
- The Church of Agert contains two items that are registered as historical objects:
  - A Ciborium (18th century)
  - A Chalice (18th century)
- The Church of Alas contains four items that are registered as historical objects:
  - A Ciborium (17th century)
  - A Framed Painting: The Virgin and child donating a rosary to Saints Dominic and Catherine of Sienna (18th century)
  - A Chalice with Paten (17th century)
  - A Confessional (18th century)

=== Environmental heritage ===
- The Réseau Paloume, a natural cavity at more than 750 m altitude.

== See also ==
- Communes of the Ariège department
