= Janet Lewis =

American novelist, poet

- Born: Janet Loxley Lewis; August 17, 1899; Chicago, Illinois, United States
- Died: December 1, 1998 (aged 99); Los Altos, California, United States
- Education: University of Chicago (Ph.B.)
- Notable work: The Wife of Martin Guerre (1941)
- Spouse: Yvor Winters (m. 1926; died 1968)
- Parents: Edwin H. Lewis (father); Elizabeth Taylor Lewis (mother)

Janet Loxley Lewis (August 17, 1899 – December 1, 1998) was an American novelist, poet, and librettist. She was considered one of the finest American literary figures of the 20th century.

== Biography ==
Lewis was born in Chicago, Illinois to Elizabeth Taylor Lewis and Edwin H. Lewis. She was a graduate of the University of Chicago, where she was a member of a literary circle that included Glenway Wescott, Elizabeth Madox Roberts, and her future husband Yvor Winters. She joined the University of Chicago Poetry Club on the advice of Winters, who was a founding member and, at the time, secretary. Lewis taught at both Stanford University in California and the University of California at Berkeley.

She wrote The Wife of Martin Guerre (1941) which is the tale of one man's deception and another's cowardice. Her first novel was The Invasion: A Narrative of Events Concerning the Johnston Family of St. Mary's (1932). Other prose works include The Trial of Soren Qvist (1947), The Ghost of Monsieur Scarron (1959), and the volume of short fiction, Good-bye, Son, and Other Stories (1946).

Lewis was also a poet, and concentrated on imagery, rhythms, and lyricism to achieve her goal. Among her works are The Indians in the Woods (1922), and the later collections Poems, 1924–1944 (1950), and Poems Old and New, 1918–1978 (1981). She also collaborated with Alva Henderson, a composer for whom she wrote three libretti and several song texts.

She married the American poet and critic Yvor Winters in 1926. Together they founded Gyroscope, a literary magazine that lasted from 1929 until 1931.

Lewis was elected a Fellow of the American Academy of Arts and Sciences in 1992. She died at her home in Los Altos, California, in 1998, at the age of 99.

== Bibliography ==
=== Fiction ===
- The Invasion: A Narrative of Events Concerning the Johnston Family of St. Mary's (1932)
- The Wife of Martin Guerre (1941)
- Good-bye, Son, and Other Stories (1946)
- The Trial of Soren Qvist (1947)
- The Ghost of Monsieur Scarron (1959)
- Against a Darkening Sky (1985)

=== Poetry ===
- The Indians in the Woods. Published by Monroe Wheeler, as Manikin Number One, Bonn, Germany, n.d. [1922].
- The Wheel in Midsummer Lynn, Mass, The Lone Gull, 1927.
- The Earth-Bound Aurora, New York, Wells College Press, 1946
- Poems 1924 – 1944 Denver, Alan Swallow, 1950
- The Ancient Ones Portola Valley, California: No Dead Lines, 1979
- The Indians in the Woods 2nd edition with new preface, Palo-Alto California, Matrix Press, 1980.
- Poems Old and New 1918 – 1978 Chicago/Athens, Ohio: Swallow Press / Ohio University Press 1981
- Late Offerings Florence, Ky, Robert L. Barth, 1988
- Janet and Deloss: Poems and Pictures San Diego, Brighton Press 1990
- The Dear Past and other poems 1919 – 1994 Edgewood Ky, Robert L. Barth, 1994
- The Selected Poems of Janet Lewis Athens, Ohio, Swallow Press / Ohio University Press, 2000, ISBN 978-0-8040-1023-8.

=== Libretti ===
- The Wife of Martin Guerre, opera in three acts after her novel, music by William Bergsma (1956)
- The Last of the Mohicans, opera in two acts after the novel by James Fenimore Cooper, music by Alva Henderson (1976)
- The Birthday of the Infanta, opera after the story by Oscar Wilde, music by Malcolm Seagrave (1979)
- The Swans, opera in three acts after the Brothers Grimm, music by Alva Henderson (1986)
- The Legend, opera after her novel The Invasion, music by Bain Murray
- Mulberry Street, opera after "The Room Across the Hall" by O. Henry, music by Alva Henderson (1988); later incorporated as Act II of West of Washington Square
