= Jon Amiel =

English film and television director

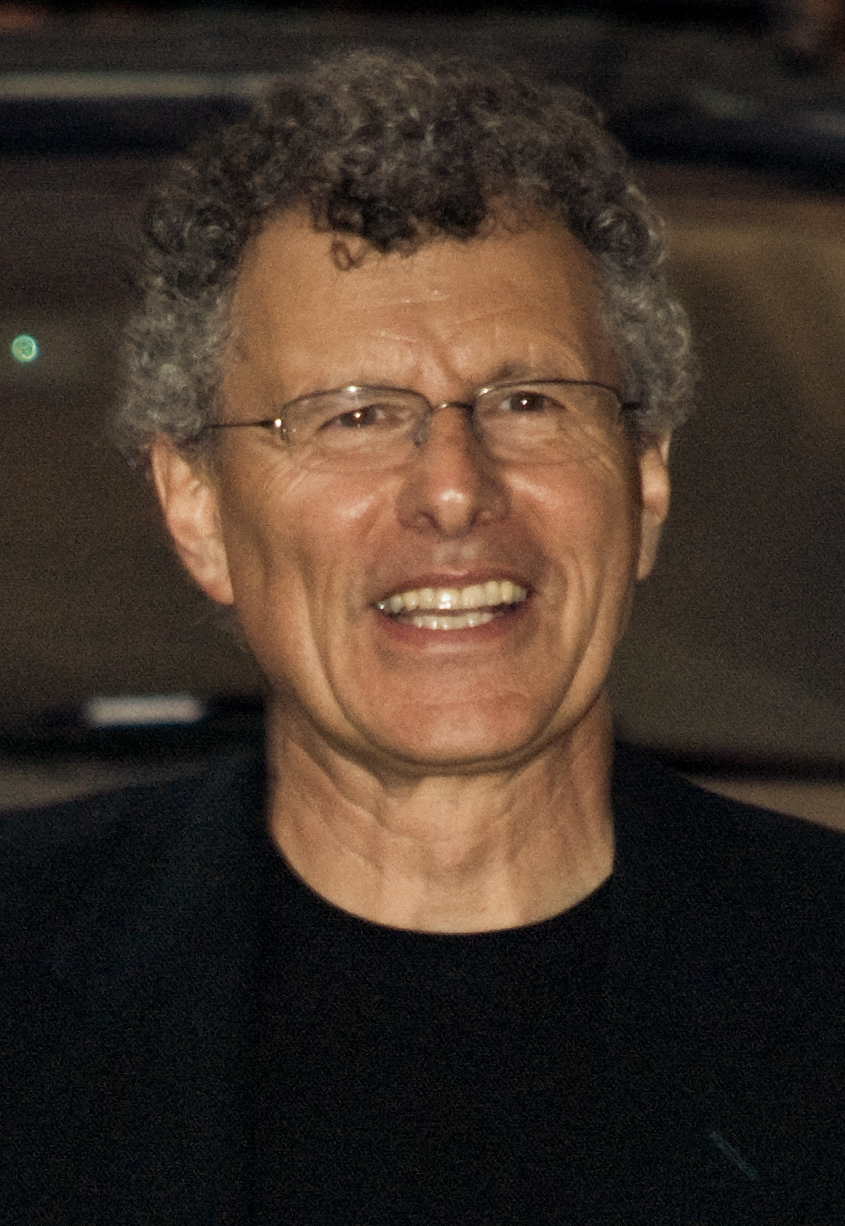
- Amiel at the 2009 Toronto International Film Festival for the premier of Creation
- Born: 20 May 1948 (age 78); London, England
- Occupation: Film director
- Years active: 1977–present

Jon Amiel (born 20 May 1948) is an English director who has worked in film and television in both the UK and the US. After receiving a BAFTA Award nomination for the BBC series The Singing Detective (1986), he went on to direct films, including Sommersby (1993), Copycat (1995), Entrapment (1999), The Core (2003) and Creation (2009).

== Biography ==
Amiel was born in London, to parents who grew up in the East End of London. Amiel's grandparents were immigrants Isaac and Mary Amiel, Polish and Russian Jews. He attended William Ellis School in Highgate, before studying English literature at Sidney Sussex College, Cambridge, graduating in 1969. It was while at Cambridge that he became involved with local theatre, and after college he went on to direct for the Royal Shakespeare Company.

After having worked as a story editor for the BBC, he directed the documentary The Silent Twins, and was chosen to direct the Dennis Potter serial The Singing Detective, for which he was BAFTA nominated. He made his feature film debut in 1989 with Queen of Hearts.

One of his most notable films is 1993's romantic drama Sommersby, starring Jodie Foster and Richard Gere. The film was a critical and commercial success, grossing $140 million worldwide.

== Filmography ==
=== Film ===
Director

- Queen of Hearts (1989)
- Tune in Tomorrow (1990)
- Sommersby (1993)
- Copycat (1995)
- The Man Who Knew Too Little (1997)
- Entrapment (1999)
- The Core (2003)
- Creation (2009)

Producer

- Simply Irresistible (1999)

=== Television ===
TV movies

- Dear Janet Rosenberg, Dear Mister Kooning (1977)
- Busted (1983)
- Romance/Romance (1983)
- The Last Evensong (1985)
- Deliverance Creek (2014) (Also executive producer)

TV series

Year	Title	Director	Executive producer	Notes
1982	BBC2 Playhouse	Yes	No	2 episodes
1982–1983	Play for Today	Yes	No	2 episodes
1985	Tandoori Nights	Yes	No	5 episodes
1986	Screen Two	Yes	No	Episode "The Silent Twins"
1986	The Singing Detective	Yes	No	Miniseries
1988	The Storyteller	Yes	No	Episode "The Luck Child"
2005	Eyes	Yes	No	Episode "Pilot"
2005	Reunion	Yes	Yes	Episode "1986"
2007	The Wedding Bells	Yes	Yes	Episode "For Whom the Bells Toll"
2008	The Tudors	Yes	No	2 episodes
2012–2013	The Borgias	Yes	No	4 episodes
2013	Twisted	Yes	No	Episode "Pilot"
2013–2015	Once Upon a Time	Yes	No	2 episodes
2014	Halt and Catch Fire	Yes	No	Episode "Giant"
2015	The Astronaut Wives Club	Yes	No	2 episodes
2015	Hemlock Grove	Yes	No	Episode "Todos Santos" (Credited as "Jonathan Amiel")
2015	Wicked City	Yes	No	Episode "Heat Wave"
2015–2016	Aquarius	Yes	No	2 episodes
2016	Marco Polo	Yes	No	2 episodes
2016–2017	Outsiders	Yes	Yes	6 episodes
2017	Ice	Yes	No	Episode "The Cut"
2017	Wisdom of the Crowd	Yes	No	Episode "Machine Learning"
2018	Seven Seconds	Yes	No	Episode "Matters of Life and Death"
2019	Proven Innocent	Yes	No	Episode "Shaken"
2019	Carnival Row	Yes	No	2 episodes
2020	Spinning Out	Yes	No	2 episodes
2020	Lincoln Rhyme: Hunt for the Bone Collector	Yes	No	Episode "Original Sin"
2021	American Gods	Yes	No	Episode "A Winter's Tale"
2022	The Cleaning Lady	Yes	No	Episode "The Lion's Den"
2022	The Walking Dead	Yes	No	2 episodes

== Awards ==
- 1987 BAFTA (British Academy Television Award) Nominee for Best Drama Series: The Singing Detective (1986)
- 1989 Montréal World Film Festival *Winner* of Montréal First Film Prize: Queen of Hearts
- 1990 Paris Film Festival *Winner* of Grand Prix: Queen of Hearts
- 1990 Deauville Film Festival *Winner* of Critics Award and Audience Award: Tune in Tomorrow
- 1996 Audience Award *Winner* at the Cognac Festival du Film Policier: Copycat
