= Gladys Campbell =

American poet and teacher

Gladys Campbell (February 1892 – July 1, 1992) was a poet and teacher in Chicago. As a student she was an early member of the University of Chicago Poetry Club.

== Life ==
Campbell attended the University of Chicago to study poetry and earned a Bachelor of Arts in 1920 and a Master of Arts in 1943. Campbell was one of the early members of the University of Chicago Poetry Club. Campbell was close friends with George Dillon, Charles Bell, and Glenway Wescott.

Campbell wrote poetry throughout her life and her poems appeared frequently in Poetry magazine, The Forge, The Dial and Book Notes.

Campbell taught English and humanities in Chicago from 1922 to 1957. Hyde Park's Poetry Society met in her apartment.

== Publications ==
- The Momentary Beach (1972)
