= Martin Guerre =

French victim of imposture (16th century)

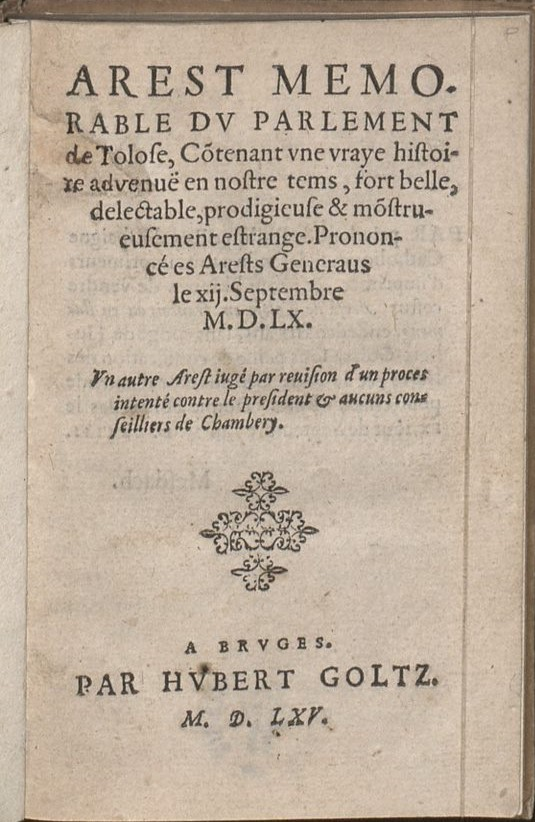
The story of Martin Guerre, published by Hubertus Goltzius in 1565. Preserved in the Public Library of Bruges.

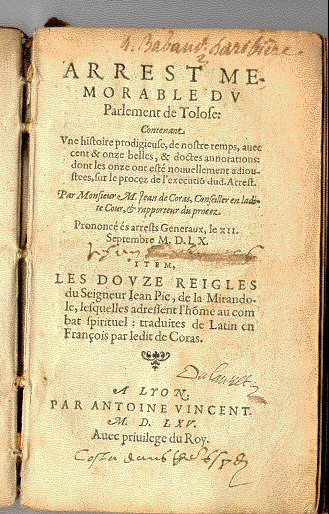
Title page of Arrest Memorable, an account of the case written by trial judge Jean de Coras in 1560 and published in 1565 in Lyon.

Martin Guerre (French pronunciation: [maʁtɛ̃ ɡɛʁ]), a French peasant of the 16th century, was at the centre of a famous case of imposture. Several years after Martin Guerre had left his wife, child and village, a man claiming to be him appeared. He lived with Guerre's wife and son for three years.

The false Martin Guerre was eventually suspected of the impersonation. He was tried, discovered to be a man named Arnaud du Tilh and executed. The real Martin Guerre had returned during the trial. The case continues to be studied and dramatised. The story was published many times and was spread throughout Europe.

== Historical account ==
=== Life before leaving his wife ===
Martin Daguerre was born around 1524 in the Basque town of Hendaye. In 1527, his family moved to the village of Artigat in the Pyrenees of southwestern France. They changed their name to Guerre. When he was about fourteen years old, Martin married Bertrande de Rols, the daughter of a well-off family. The marriage was childless for eight years until a son, Sanxi (named after Martin's father), was born.

Accused of stealing grain from his father, Martin abruptly disappeared in 1548. Canon law did not allow his abandoned wife to remarry.

=== Martin Guerre's supposed return ===
In the summer of 1556, a man arrived in Artigat who claimed to be the long-gone Martin Guerre. By his similar looks and detailed knowledge of Guerre's life, he convinced most of the villagers. Martin Guerre's uncle and four sisters, as well as his wife Bertrande, believed the man was Guerre, as he claimed, although doubts remained.

The man who had returned as Martin Guerre lived for three years with Bertrande and her son; they had two children together, with one daughter, Bernarde, surviving. He claimed the inheritance of Guerre's father, who had died. When he sued Guerre's paternal uncle, Pierre Guerre, who had married Bertrande's widowed mother during Martin Guerre's long absence, for part of the inheritance, Pierre became suspicious. He and his wife tried to convince Bertrande that the returnee was an impostor. A soldier who passed through Artigat claimed the man was a fraud, pointing out that the true Martin had lost a leg in the ongoing war in Italy. Pierre and his sons-in-law attacked the returnee with a club, but Bertrande intervened.

In 1559, villagers accused the returnee of arson and of impersonating the real Martin Guerre. With Bertrande remaining by his side, he was acquitted in 1560.

=== Trial in Rieux ===
In the meantime, Pierre Guerre had been asking around and believed he had uncovered the identity of the impostor: Arnaud du Tilh, nicknamed "Pansette" ('big belly'), a man with a poor reputation from the village of Tilh, about 68 km (42 mi) to the north. Pierre initiated a new case against the man by falsely claiming to act in Bertrande's name (only the wronged wife could bring the suit). He and his wife, Bertrande's mother, pressured Bertrande to support the charge, to which she eventually agreed.

In 1560, the case was tried in Rieux. Bertrande testified that at first she had honestly believed the man to be her husband, but that she had since realised that he was an impostor. Both Bertrande and the accused independently related an identical story about their intimate life from before 1548.

The man claiming to be Martin then challenged her: if she would swear that he was not her husband, he would gladly agree to be executed – Bertrande remained silent. After hearing from more than 150 witnesses, with many testifying they recognized Martin Guerre (including his four sisters), many others testifying to Arnaud du Tilh's identity, and others refusing to take a side, the accused was convicted and sentenced to death by beheading.

=== Appeal and reappearance of Martin Guerre ===
The condemned man immediately appealed to the Parlement of Toulouse. Officials arrested Bertrande and Pierre on charges of false accusation, and in the case of Pierre, soliciting perjury. The returnee eloquently argued his case, and the judges in Toulouse tended to believe his version of the story: that Bertrande was pressured to perjury by the greedy Pierre Guerre. The accused had to undergo detailed questioning about his past; his statements were double-checked, and no contradictions were found.

Then, dramatically, a man appeared in Toulouse during the trial, with a wooden leg, claiming to be the true Martin Guerre. When asked about the married couple's past, the man had forgotten some details and was not able to answer the questions as well as the alleged impostor; however, when the two men were both presented to the Guerre family, the case was closed: Pierre, Bertrande, and Martin's four sisters all agreed that the newly arrived man was the true Martin Guerre.

The impostor, who maintained his innocence, was convicted and sentenced to death for adultery and fraud; the public sentencing on 12 September 1560 was attended by Michel de Montaigne. Afterward, the condemned confessed. He revealed that he had learned about Guerre's life after two men had confused him with Guerre, and then decided to take Guerre's place, with two conspirators helping him with the details. He apologized to all involved, including Bertrande, for having deceived them. He was hanged in front of Martin Guerre's house in Artigat four days later.

Guerre would end up having two more children with Bertrande before her death some time prior to the mid-1570s: Pierre and Gaspard. Guerre would remarry, and later have another son, also named Pierre, with his second wife in the mid-1570s, while Guerre himself died some time between then and 1594, when mention of the division of property to his sons was made.

=== Martin's life during his absence ===
During his long absence from Artigat, the real Martin Guerre had moved to Spain, where he served in the militia for a cardinal and subsequently in the army of Pedro de Mendoza. As part of the Spanish army, he was sent to Flanders. He was wounded in the Spanish attack on St. Quentin in 1557; his leg had to be amputated.

For years, Guerre lived in a religious house run by the Order of Saint John of Jerusalem before returning to his wife and family. The reason for his return at the time of the trial is unknown. Initially, he rejected his wife's apologies, maintaining that she should have known better than to take another man.

== Contemporary accounts and interpretations ==
Two contemporary accounts of the case were written: Histoire Admirable by Guillaume Le Sueur and the better-known Arrest Memorable by Jean de Coras, one of the trial judges in Toulouse.

In 1983, Princeton University history professor Natalie Zemon Davis published a detailed exploration of the case in her book The Return of Martin Guerre. She argued that Bertrande had silently or explicitly agreed to the fraud because she needed a husband in that society, and she was treated well by the impostor. Davis noted as evidence for this theory the improbability of a woman's mistaking a stranger for her husband, Bertrande's support for Arnaud until (and even partially during) the trial, and their shared story of intimacy, likely prepared in advance.

The historian Robert Finlay has criticised Davis's conclusions, arguing that Bertrande was duped (as most of her contemporaries believed, including the trial judges) after her husband's long absence. He thought that Davis attempted to superimpose a modern societal model of an independent woman making her own choices onto the historical account. He points to the improbability of Bertrande's charging her own accomplice with fraud, as she would run the risk of having to defend herself against charges of adultery or false accusation.

== Literature and popular culture ==
The unusual story has continued to fascinate and inspire many writers:

- Alexandre Dumas, père, included a fictional account of the events in his novel The Two Dianas as well as in his multi-volume Celebrated Crimes (1841).
- Janet Lewis's historical novel The Wife of Martin Guerre (1941) is an exploration of Bertrande and her motives for her actions.
- Philip K. Dick's 1955 short story "Human Is" tells of the dilemma for the wife of a cold abusive man who returns from a mission changed for the better. The story was dramatised in the 2017 TV series Electric Dreams, which features the man on trial as an alien imposter, who is saved by the testimony of his wife.
- The Wife of Martin Guerre (1956) is an opera by the American composer William Bergsma with a libretto by Janet Lewis.
- The 1982 film The Return of Martin Guerre, directed by Daniel Vigne and starring Gérard Depardieu and Nathalie Baye, was based on the historic accounts. The screenplay added a fictional ending, including an account of Bertrand's motives. Historian Natalie Davis (see above) served as consultant for the film.
- The True Story of Martin Guerre, a BBC Radio 4 two-part drama by Guy Meredith from the trial notes of Jean de Coras, first broadcast in June 1992 and starring Sean Bean as both Martin Guerre and the Imposter and Lesley Dunlop as Bertrande. It also uses the same fictionalized motives of Bertrande as in the Depardieu film, and was rebroadcast in 2016, 2018, 2020, 2022 and 2023 on BBC Radio 4 Extra.
- Sommersby (1993) was a Hollywood adaptation of the story, starring Jodie Foster and Richard Gere. It set the events in the United States during and after the American Civil War.
- The musical The House of Martin Guerre (1993) was based on the case and was first produced in Toronto.
- The musical Martin Guerre (1996), by Claude-Michel Schönberg and Alain Boublil, premiered in London at the Prince Edward Theatre. It set the story at the time of the Massacre of St Bartholomew, during the French government's persecution of the Huguenots. Its ending deviated from the historical account.
- Wiedersehen mit einem Fremden ("The Return of a Stranger"), a 2010 German TV film, directed by Niki Stein, sets the account in a village in the Black Forest after World War II. The end differs from the historic events.
- Another musical titled Martin Guerre, written by Laura Harrington and Roger Ames, was premiered at the Hartford Stage, 1993, directed by Mark Lamos and starring Judy Kuhn. It won the Connecticut "Best Play" award that year and had a sold-out, extended run into 1994.
- The Simpsons season 9 episode "The Principal and the Pauper" is sometimes noted for its similarities to the case, with Principal Seymour Skinner discovered to be an imposter after the real Skinner returns to Springfield. However, the episode's writer, Ken Keeler, has stated that "This episode is not – despite what people have been saying for eight years – based on or a rip-off of or a goof on the story of Martin Guerre." He said "The pattern of facts is clearly the Tichborne claimant story, and not Martin Guerre."
- Beatriz's War (2013), the first feature film produced in the country of East Timor, reprised the plot of Martin Guerre.
- Martin Guerre is mentioned in the pilot episode of the British sitcom Back (2017).
- The video game Pentiment (2022) contains a character inspired by this event, also named Martin Bauer.
- In The Day of the Jackal (2024), Alexander Duggan goes by the username **&525marTinGuerrE^$, drawing a connection to the fact that Duggan is an imposter himself.
- In the 10th episode of season six ("Reignition Sequence") of the FX adult animated show Archer, both the tale of Martin Guerre and the Hollywood remake titled Sommersby are referenced.
