= Giovanni Levi =

Italian historian

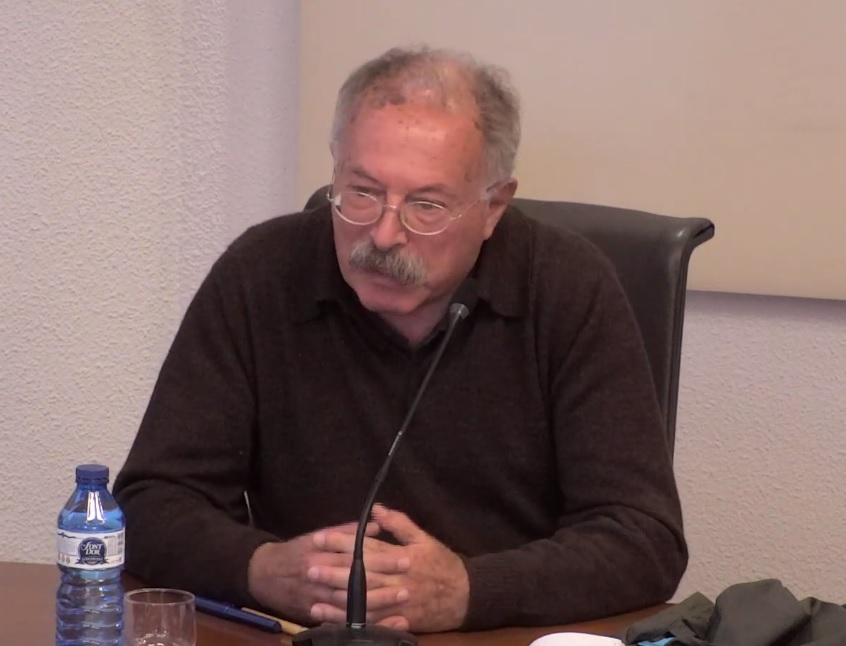
Giovanni Levi, 2019

Giovanni Levi (born 29 April 1939) is an Italian historian. He is Professor Emeritus of Economic History at the Ca' Foscari University of Venice. He is one of the pioneers in the field of microhistory.

== Selected works ==
- Centro e periferia di uno Stato assoluto. Tre saggi su Piemonte e Liguria in età moderna. Rosenberg e Sellier, Turin 1985, ISBN 88-7011-211-X.
- Das immaterielle Erbe. Eine bäuerliche Welt an der Schwelle zur Moderne. Wagenbach, Berlin 1986, ISBN 3-8031-3527-3.
- On Microhistory. In: New Perspectives on Historical Writing. Pennsylvania State University Press, Cambridge 1992, ISBN 0-271-00834-2.
- Geschichte der Jugend. Fischer, Frankfurt am Main 1996, ISBN 3-10-021410-2.
- The Origins of the Modern State and the Microhistorical Perspective. In: Mikrogeschichte – Makrogeschichte. Komplementär oder inkommensurabel? Wallstein, Göttingen 1998, ISBN 3-89244-321-1.
