= Jacques Revel =

French historian (1942–2026)

Jacques Revel (French pronunciation: [ʒak ʁəvɛl]; 25 July 1942 – 12 March 2026) was a French historian. He was the emeritus director of studies and a president of l'École des hautes études en sciences sociales (EHESS). Revel died on 12 March 2026, at the age of 83.

== Publications ==
- with Michel de Certeau and Dominique Julia, Une politique de la langue. La Révolution française et les patois. L'enquête de Grégoire (1790-1794), Paris, 1975; rééd. augmentée d'une postface de D. Julia et J. Revel, Paris, Gallimard, Folio, 2002.
- with Dominique Julia and Roger Chartier, Histoire sociale des populations étudiantes, Paris, EHES, 2 vol.
- (éd.), Jeux d'échelle, Paris, Le Seuil-Gallimard, 1996
- with François Hartog (dir.), Les usages politiques du passé, Enquête, Paris, éditions de l'EHESS, 2001.
- with G. Levi (eds.), Political Uses of the Past. The Recent Mediterranean Experience, Frank Cass, Londres-Portland, 2002.
- with Jean-Claude Passeron (dir.), Penser par cas, Enquête, Paris, Éditions de l'EHESS, 2005.
- Un momento historiográfico, Buenos Aires, Manantial, 2006.
- (éd.), Giochi di scala. La microstoria alla prova dell'esperienza, Rome, Viella, 2006.
- Las Construcciones francesas del pasado, La escuela francesa y la historiografía del pasado, Fondo de Cultura Económica, Buenos Aires, 2002.
- Un parcours critique. Douze essais d'histoire sociale, Paris, Galaade, 2006.
- with Jean Boutier et Jean-Claude Passeron (dir.), Qu'est-ce qu'une discipline ?, Paris, Éditions de l'EHESS, « Enquête 5 », 2006.
