= Jean de Coras =

French jurist

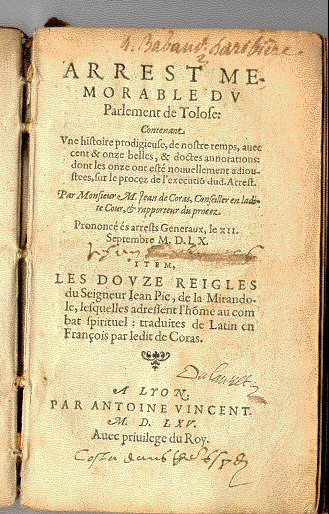
Coras' Arrest Memorable of the trial of Martin Guerre.

Jean de Coras, also called Corasius (1515–1572) was a French jurist.

== Life ==
Born in Réalmont as the son of a notary, he studied law in Toulouse, Cahors, Orléans and perhaps also in other cities, under teachers such as Franciscus Curtis junior and Marianus Socinus junior. After his 1535 promotion in Padua by Filippo Decio, he taught law at the University of Toulouse starting in 1536, in Valence (1545) and in Ferrara (1550), where he became one of the most popular professors of the time.

In 1552, Coras became a member of the Toulouse parlement and participated in the famous trial of Martin Guerre, of which he wrote the best-known record, Arrest Memorable du parlement de Tolose (1560). In 1562, having converted from the Roman Catholic Church to the Calvinist Reformed Church of France, he failed in an attempt to open Toulouse to the Huguenots, but was rehabilitated on account of his connections to the royal court. Even so, Coras later assisted in organising the Protestant unrests that culminated in the first French War of Religion. He was convicted and sentenced to death for having served the Prince of Condé in 1568, and was murdered in prison following the St. Bartholomew's Day massacre in 1572.

== Legacy ==
Together with scholars such as Baron, Dumoulin, Connan and Douaren, De Coras was part of the generation of jurists that established humanist jurisprudence in France. His principal contributions to legal scholarship were his attempts to uncover dogmatic contexts beyond the mere exegesis of Roman law, and his contributions to constitutional law that influenced Jean Bodin.

His works include various commentaries on the Pandects, a number of dogmatic papers on various topics, the discourse De iuris arte libellus (1560) and a compilation of legal cases, Centuria memorabilium Curiae Tholosane (1599).

The poet and Roman Catholic convert Jacques de Coras was his grandson.
