= William Bergsma =

American composer (1921–1994)

William Laurence Bergsma (April 1, 1921 – March 18, 1994) was an American composer and teacher. He was long associated with Juilliard School, where he taught composition, until he moved to the University of Washington as head of their music school until 1971.

== Life ==
Bergsma was born in Oakland, California. After studying piano (with his mother, a former opera singer) and then the viola, he moved on to study composition. Bergsma attended Stanford University for two years (1938–40) before moving to the Eastman School of Music, where he earned his bachelor's and master's degrees; his most significant teachers there were Howard Hanson and Bernard Rogers.

In 1946 he accepted a position at Juilliard, where he remained until 1963, eventually holding such positions as chair of composition and from 1961 to 1963, associate dean. In 1963 he moved on to the University of Washington, heading the music school until 1971, remaining a professor from then on after stepping down from the administrative post. In 1966 Bergsma founded the Contemporary Group at the University of Washington, an organization of composers and musicians who stage performances of new musical works and educate students and the public about contemporary music; the group remains active to this day.

Bergsma was the recipient of two Guggenheim Fellowships, a grant from the National Endowment for the Arts, and an award from the American Academy of Arts and Letters. Students of Bergsma include composers Jack Behrens, Philip Glass, Karl Korte, Robert Parris, and Steve Reich.

Bergsma's music is noted for its lyrical, contrapuntal qualities. Unlike many of his contemporaries, Bergsma rejected serialism in favor of a more conservative style, though one distinctly rooted in the 20th century. He eschewed the avant-garde—his obituary in the Seattle Post-Intelligencer describes him as having "never deserted tonality" and seeing "dozens of his former avant-garde colleagues returning to the fold"—though he did embrace aleatoric techniques later in his career.

He composed two operas, The Wife of Martin Guerre (1956) and The Murder of Comrade Sharik (1973), which are markedly different in style. The first is a somber tale of a 16th-century French peasant's disappearance and return upon which he is suspected to be an impostor; the music is marked by dissonance which emphasizes the tension in the story, particularly in the final courtroom scene. The second is more lighthearted and comic; Bergsma wrote his own libretto after the story Heart of a Dog by Mikhail Bulgakov, which involves a dog transforming into a citizen of 1920s Moscow as a result of a doctor's experiments. The partially aleatoric orchestral writing is intended to be the voice of Stalin, and uses quotes from Carmen, La traviata and Don Giovanni for comedic effect. He was also a skillful composer of smaller works, including many for chamber ensemble and solo piano as well as orchestral writings.

Bergsma died in Seattle of a heart attack, at the age of 72.

== Selected works ==
- Gold and the Señor Commandante (1940-41), ballet (also 9-movement suite)
- The Fortunate Islands (1947), string orchestra
- Tangents (1951), piano
- A Carol on Twelfth Night (1954), orchestra
- The Wife of Martin Guerre (1956), opera
- A Desk for Billie (1956) (score for educational film)
- March with Trumpets (1956), band
- Concerto for wind quintet (1958)
- Chameleon Variations (1960) orchestra
- Fantastic Variations on a Theme from Tristan and Isolde (1961), viola and piano
- In Celebration, (1963), orchestra
- Violin Concerto, (1965), violin and orchestra
- The Sun, the Soaring Eagle, the Turquoise Prince, the God (1968) Choir
- The Murder of Comrade Sharik (1973), opera
- Symphony no. 2, "Voyages" (1976), mezzo-soprano, chorus, and orchestra
- Sweet Was the Song the Virgin Sung; Tristan Revisited: Variations and a Fantasy for viola and orchestra (1977, revised 1978); "Viola Concerto"
- The Voice of the Coelacanth (1981), horn, violin, and piano
- Variations (1984), piano

== See also ==
- Joseph H. Bearns Prize
