= Natalie Zemon Davis =

Canadian and American historian (1928–2023)

Natalie Zemon Davis CC
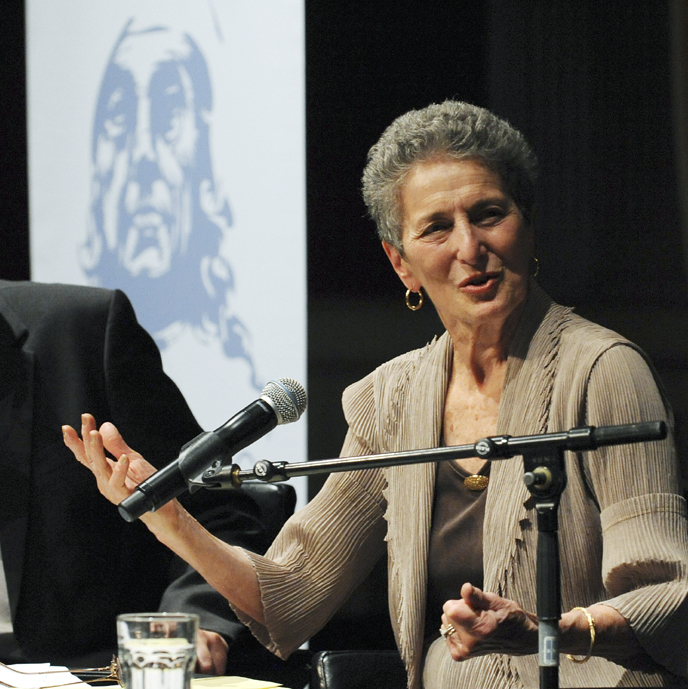
- Davis in 2010
- Born: November 8, 1928; Detroit, Michigan, U.S.
- Died: October 21, 2023 (aged 94); Toronto, Ontario, Canada
- Education: University of Michigan
- Occupations: Historian, writer
- Spouse: Chandler Davis

Natalie Zemon Davis, CC (November 8, 1928 – October 21, 2023) was an American-Canadian historian of the early modern period. She was the Henry Charles Lea Professor of History at Princeton University. Her work originally focused on France, but it later broadened to include other parts of Europe, North America, and the Caribbean. For example, her book, Trickster Travels (2006), views Italy, Spain, Morocco and other parts of North Africa and West Africa through the lens of Leo Africanus's travels. Davis' books have been widely translated into other languages: twenty-two for The Return of Martin Guerre, one of her most well-known works. She was the second female president of the American Historical Association.

Davis was awarded the Holberg International Memorial Prize and National Humanities Medal and was named Companion of the Order of Canada.

== Life ==
Natalie Zemon Davis (née Zemon) was born in Detroit, Michigan, on November 8, 1928, into a middle-class Jewish family of Eastern European origin. Her mother worked as a homemaker, and her father worked in the textile trade. She traced her intellectual path to her Jewish heritage although her work did not center on Jewish issues. Davis attended Cranbrook Kingswood School and she was subsequently educated at Smith College, Radcliffe College, Harvard University, and the University of Michigan, from which she received her PhD in 1959. Her dissertation treated religion and class among the printers of Lyon in the 16th century. In 1948, she met and married the mathematician and activist Chandler Davis (1926–2022). Natalie became involved in left-wing politics while at Smith College and the couple had difficulties in the U.S. during the era of the Red Scare. Chandler Davis lost his professorship in Michigan, and in the 1960s, the couple moved to Canada with their three children.

Natalie Zemon Davis subsequently taught at Brown University, the University of Toronto, the University of California at Berkeley, and from 1978 to her retirement in 1996, at Princeton University, where she became the Henry Charles Lea Professor of History and director of the Shelby Cullom Davis Center for Historical Studies. In addition to courses in the history of early modern France, she has taught and co-taught courses in history and anthropology, early modern Jewish social history, and history and film. She was also an important figure in the study of the history of women and gender—founding, with Jill Ker Conway, a course in that subject in 1971 at the University of Toronto (one of the first such courses in North America).

Following her retirement, she lived in Toronto, where she was Adjunct Professor of History and Anthropology and Professor of Medieval Studies at the University of Toronto. She died of cancer at her home in Toronto on October 21, 2023, at the age of 94.

== Research interests ==
Natalie Davis' main interests were in the social and cultural history of the Early Modern Europe, especially France, and focused on individuals and social groups previously ignored by historians. She made use of numerous sources such as judicial records, plays, notarial records, tax rolls, early printed books and pamphlets, autobiographies and folk tales. She was a proponent of cross-disciplinary history, which consists of combining history with disciplines such as anthropology, ethnography and literary theory. In her Society and Culture in Early Modern France (1975), she explored the lives of artisans and peasants: their relation to the Protestant Reformation, their carnivals, uprisings, and religious violence, and the impact of printing on their ways of thinking.

In her book best known to the public, The Return of Martin Guerre (1983), she followed a celebrated case of a 16th-century impostor in a village in the Pyrénées to see how peasants thought about personal identity. Often linked with Carlo Ginzburg's microhistory The Cheese and the Worms about the radical miller Menocchio, Davis's book grew out of her experience as historical consultant for Daniel Vigne's film Le retour de Martin Guerre. Her book first appeared in French in 1982 at the same time as the premiere of the film. The Financial Times described Zemon Davis as a "pioneer of microhistory".

Davis's interest in story-telling continued with her book, Fiction in the Archives: Pardon Tales and their Tellers in 16th-century France (1987), a study of the stories people of all classes told to the king to get pardoned for homicide in the days before manslaughter was a possible plea. In her Women on the Margins (1995), she looked at the autobiographical accounts of three 17th-century women—the Jewish merchant Glikl Hamel, the Catholic nun Marie de l'Incarnation, who came to New France, and the Protestant entomologist-artist Maria Sibylla Merian—and discussed the role of religion in their lives.

Her book on The Gift in Sixteenth-Century France (2000) is both a picture of gifts and bribes in the 16th century and a discussion of a viable mode of exchange different from the market. In Trickster Travels (2006), she describes how the early 16th-century North African Muslim "Leo Africanus" (Hasan al-Wazzan) managed to live as a Christian in Italy after he was kidnapped by Christian pirates and also sees his writings as an example of "the possibility of communication and curiosity in a world divided by violence." In 2017, she served as historical consultant for Wajdi Mouawad's new play Tous des Oiseaux that premiered in Paris at the Théâtre de La Colline. Set in present-day New York and Jerusalem, the play follows a German/Israeli family riven by conflict when the geneticist son wants to marry an Arab-American woman who is doing her doctoral dissertation on Hassan al-Wazzan/Leo Africanus, the subject of Davis' Trickster Travels. Her book (unfinished), Braided Histories on 18th-century Suriname studies networks of communication and association among families, both slave and free, on the plantations of Christian and Jewish settlers.

Davis's historical writings sometimes resorted to speculation through her use of analogous evidence and inserting words like "perhaps" and phrases like "she may have thought." Some critics of her work find this troubling and think that this practice threatens the empirical base of the historian's profession. Davis's answer to this is suggested in her 1992 essay "Stories and the Hunger to Know", where she argues both for the role of interpretation by historians and their essential quest for evidence about the past: both must be present and acknowledged to keep people from claiming that they have an absolute handle on "truth". She opened her Women on the Margins with an imaginary dialogue, in which her three subjects upbraid her for her approach and for putting them in the same book. In her Slaves on Screen (2000), Davis maintains that feature films can provide a valuable way of telling about the past, what she calls "thought experiments", but only so long as they are connected with general historical evidence.

== Awards and recognition ==
- 2000: the Aby Warburg Prize for science in the humanities, awarded by the city of Hamburg.
- In 2010, the Holberg International Memorial Prize, worth 4.5 million Norwegian kroner (~$700,000 US), for her narrative approach to the field of history. The award's citation described her as "one of the most creative historians writing today" who inspired younger generations of historians and promoted "cross-fertilization between disciplines". The citation said her compelling narrative "shows how particular events can be narrated and analyzed so as to reveal deeper historical tendencies and underlying patterns of thought and action".
- In 2011, Davis was elected to the American Philosophical Society.
- On June 29, 2012, Davis was named a Companion of the Order of Canada, the highest class within the order. She formally received her Order of Canada Insignia from Governor General David Johnston during an Investiture at Rideau Hall on September 28, 2012.
- She received the Canadian Version of the Queen Elizabeth II Diamond Jubilee Medal in 2012.
- On July 10, 2013, Davis was awarded the 2012 National Humanities Medal by President Barack Obama for "her insights into the study of history and her exacting eloquence in bringing the past into focus."
- In November 1990, a symposium to honor Davis was held at Boston University: "Dialogues with the Past." The ensuing conference proceedings served also as a Festschrift to celebrate the work of Professor Davis as author and teacher.

Natalie Zemon Davis received several honorary degrees from universities around the world including Smith College, Northwestern University, Wesleyan University the University of Rochester George Washington University Williams College, Tufts University, the University of Toronto, the University of Pennsylvania, Harvard University, the University of Edinburgh, the Hebrew University of Jerusalem, Concordia University, Amherst College, Yale University the University of St Andrews, Mount Saint Vincent University and Western University.

== Works ==
- "The Rites of Violence: Religious Riot in Sixteenth-Century France", Past & Present Volume 59 (May 1973): pages 51–91.
- Society and Culture in Early Modern France: Eight Essays, Stanford University Press, 1975.
- "'Women's History" in Transition': the European Case", Feminist Studies Volume 3, no. 3 (Spring-Summer 1976): pages 83–103.
- "Beyond the Market: Books as Gifts in Sixteenth-Century France", Transactions of the Royal Historical Society Volume 33 (1983): pages 69–88.
- The Return of Martin Guerre, Cambridge, MA: Harvard University Press, 1983.
- Frauen und Gesellschaft am Beginn der Neuzeit, Berlin: Wagenbach, 1986.
- Fiction in the Archives: Pardon Tales and their Tellers in Sixteenth Century France, Stanford University Press, 1987.
- "Gender in the Academy: Women and Learning from Plato to Princeton: An Exhibition Celebrating the 20th Anniversary of Undergraduate Coeducation at Princeton University" / organized by Natalie Zemon Davis ... [et al.]: Princeton University Library, 1990.
- "Stories and the Hunger to Know," Yale Journal of Criticism Volume 5, no. 2 (Spring 1992): pages 159–163.
- Renaissance and Enlightenment Paradoxes, co-edited with Arlette Farge, Cambridge, MA: Belknap Press, 1993. Volume III of A History of Women in the West. [Originally published in Italian in 1991.]
- Women on the Margins: Three Seventeenth-Century Lives, Cambridge, MA: Harvard University Press, 1995.
- A Life of Learning: Charles Homer Haskins Lecture for 1997, New York: American Council of Learned Societies, 1997.
- "Religion and Capitalism Once Again? Jewish Merchant Culture in the Seventeenth Century" from Representations no. 59 (Summer 1997): pages 56–84.
- Remaking Impostors: From Martin Guerre to Sommersby, Egham, Surrey, UK: Royal Holloway Publications Unit, 1997.
- The Gift in Sixteenth-Century France, University of Wisconsin Press, 2000.
- Slaves on Screen: Film and Historical Vision, Cambridge, MA: Harvard University Press, 2002.
- Trickster Travels: A Sixteenth-Century Muslim Between Worlds New York: Hill & Wang, 2006.
- Leo Africanus Discovers Comedy: Theatre and Poetry Across the Mediterranean. Toronto: Centre for Renaissance and Reformation Studies, 2021.
- Listening to the Languages of the People: Lazare Sainéan on Romanian, Yiddish, and French. Budapest: Central European University Press, 2022.

== Sources ==
- Adams, R.M. Review of Fiction in the Archives page 35 from New York Review of Books, Volume 34, Issue No. 4, March 16, 1989.
- Adelson, R. Interview with Natalie Zemon Davis pages 405–422 from Historian Volume 53, Issue No. 3, 1991.
- Benson, E. "The Look of the Past: Le Retour de Martin Guerre" pages 125–135 from Radical History Review, Volume 28, 1984.
- Bossy, J. "As it Happened: Review of Fiction in the Archives", pages 359 from Times Literacy Supplement, Issue 4488, April 7, 1989.
- Chartier, Roger Cultural History Between Practices and Representations, Cambridge: Polity Press, 1988.
- Coffin, J. & Harding. R. "Interview with Natalie Zemon Davis " pages 99–122 from Visions of History edited by H. Abelove, B. Blackmar, P.Dimock & J. Schneer, Manchester, UK: Manchester University Press, 1984.
- Diefendorf, Barbara and Hesse, Carla (editors) Culture and Identity in Early Modern France (1500–1800): Essays in Honor of Natalie Zemon Davis, Ann Arbor: University of Michigan Press, 1993.
- Finlay, R. "The Refashioning of Martin Guerre" pages 553–571 from American Historical Review Volume 93, Issue #3, 1988.
- Guneratne, A. "Cinehistory and the Puzzling Case of Martin Guerre" pages 2–19 from Film and History, Volume 21, Issue # 1, 1991.
- Le Roy Ladurie, Emmanuel "Double Trouble: Review of The Return of Martin Guerre" pages 12–13 from The New York Review of Books, Volume 30, Issue #20, December 22, 1983.
- O'Connor, J.E (editor) Images as Artifact: the Historical Analysis of Film and Television, Malabar, Florida: R.E. Krieger, 1990.
- Orest, R. Review of Women on the Margins pages 808–810 from American Historical Review, Volume 102, Issue #3, 1997.
- Quinn, A. Review of Women on the Margins page 18 from New York Times Review of Books, December 10, 1995.
- Roelker, N.L. Review of Fiction in the Archives pages 1392–1393 from American Historical Review Volume 94, Issue #5, 1989.
- Roper, L. Review of Women on the Margins pages 4–5 from Times Literacy Supplement 4868, July 19, 1996.
- Snowman, Daniel "Natalie Zemon Davis" pages 18–20 from History Today Volume 52 Issue October 10, 2002.
