= Rue Saint-Séverin, Paris =

Street in Paris, France

Rue Saint-Séverin
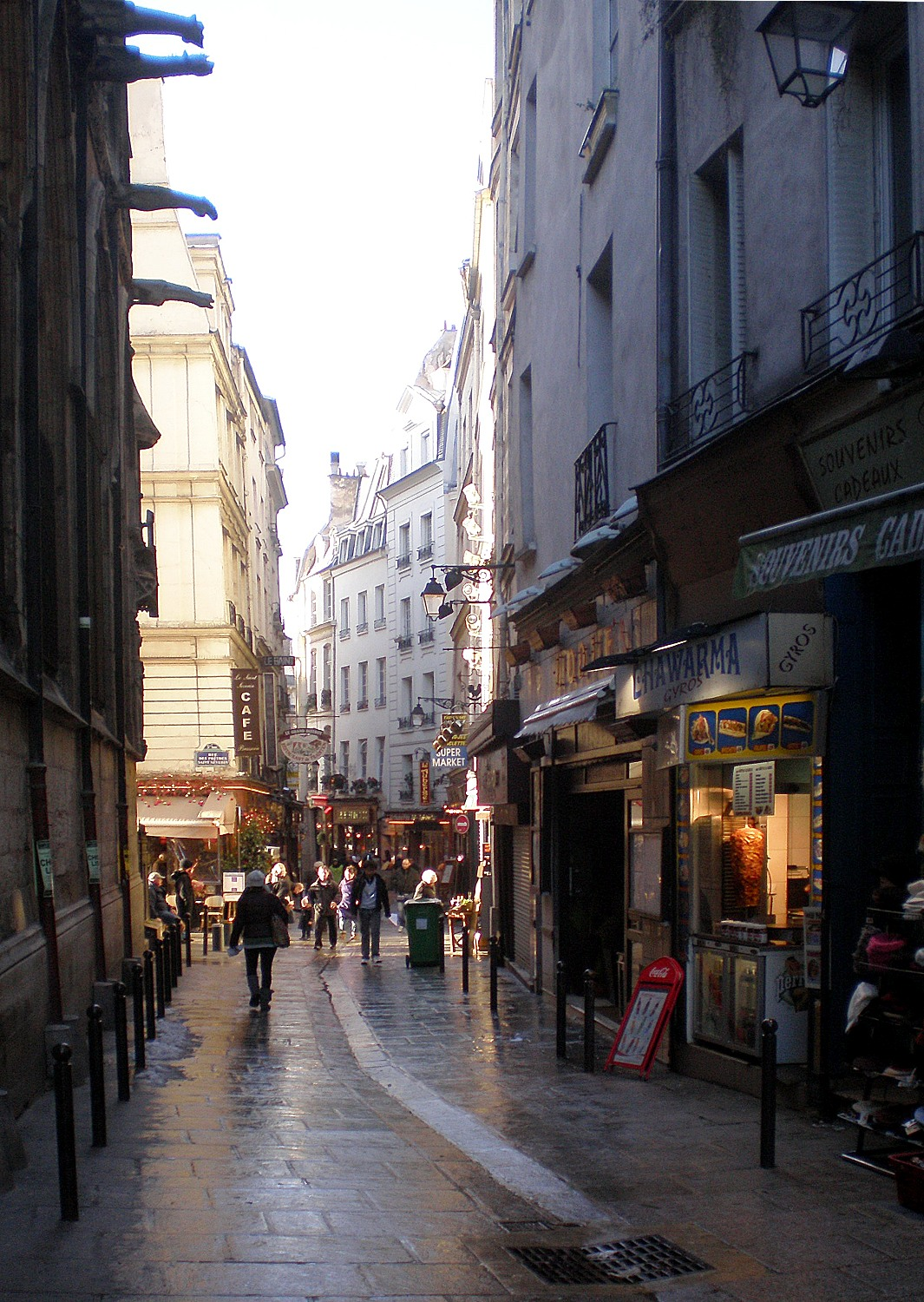
- View westwards along the Rue Saint-Séverin

- Location within Paris
- Length: 170 m (560 ft)
- Width: 10 m (33 ft) between the rue Saint-Jacques, Paris and rue de la Harpe, Paris; 12 m the remaining
- Arrondissement: 5th
- Quarter: Sorbonne
- Coordinates: 48°51′8.3″N 2°20′44″E
- From: 12 rue Saint-Jacques and 18 rue du Petit Pont
- To: 3 boulevard Saint-Michel

Construction
- Completion: Portion to the west of the rue de la Harpe opened in 1855.
- Denomination: 19 August 1864

The Rue Saint-Séverin (French pronunciation: [ʁy sɛ̃ sevʁɛ̃]) is a street running parallel to the river in the north of Paris' Latin Quarter. Lined with restaurants and souvenir shops, much of its commerce is dedicated to tourism.

== Name origin ==
One of Paris' oldest churches, the Église Saint-Séverin, lies midway along this street's length.

== History ==
The Rue Saint-Séverin is one of Paris' oldest streets, as it dates from its quarter's creation in the early 13th century. At first existing only between the Rue de la Harpe and the Rue Saint-Jacques, it was later extended westwards from the former street to join the Rue Saint-André-des-Arts. The Rue Saint-Séverin reclaimed the remnants of the ancient Rue du Macon upon the construction of the Boulevard Saint-Michel from 1867, but from 1971, this isolated westward portion was renamed the Rue Francisque-Gay.

Between the Rue de la Harpe and the Rue Saint-Jacques, this street was called the Rue Colin Pochet in the 16th century.

== Notable buildings ==
No. 6

No. 6

No. 13

No. 8

=== Odd numbers ===
- Nos. 7, 9, 11: Buildings dating from the 17th century.
- No. 13: Building still having its "name sign" that predated addresses - this one Le Cygne de la Croix (a play-on-words of "the sign of the Cross" and "The Swan on the Cross").

=== Even numbers ===
- No. 4: Engraving of streetname on building corner. The "St." was scratched away after the 1789 French Revolution.
- No. 6: Alleyway existing (and already barricaded) in 1239.
- No. 8: Door and alleyway dating from the 16th century.
- No. 20: 17th-century rotisserie (grill).
- No. 22: 17th-century hotel.
- Nos. 24-26: Street name engraved on building corners. The "St." on both was scratched away after the 1789 revolution.
- No. 34: Building dating from the 17th century. Remarkable doorway, arch engravings, courtyard and stairway (therein).
- No. 36: Building known as l'auberge de "l'Étoile" in 1660.

== See also ==
- The Great Cat Massacre
