= Montereale Valcellina =

Montereale Valcellina Montreâl (Friulian)
- Comune
- Comune di Montereale Valcellina
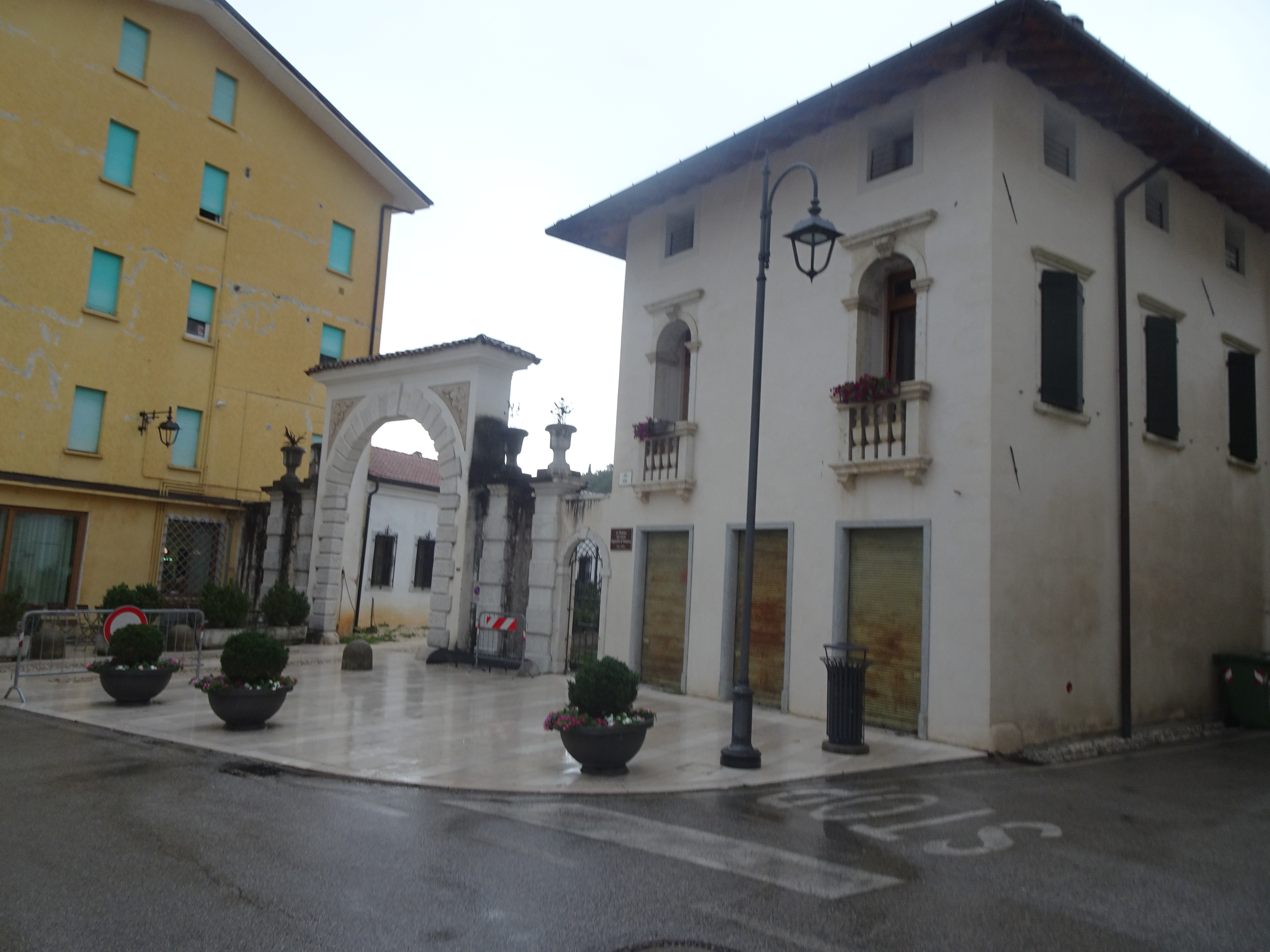

- Coat of arms

- Location within Italy Location within Friuli-Venezia Giulia
- Coordinates: 46°10′N 12°40′E
- Country: Italy
- Region: Friuli-Venezia Giulia
- Province: Pordenone (PN)
- Frazioni: Grizzo, Malnisio, San Leonardo Valcellina

Government
  - Mayor: Igor Alzetta

Area
  - Total: 67.88 km^{2} (26.21 sq mi)
- Elevation: 317 m (1,040 ft)

Population (30 November 2017)
  - Total: 4,373
  - Density: 64.42/km^{2} (166.9/sq mi)
- Demonym: Monterealini
- Time zone: UTC+1 (CET)
  - Summer (DST): UTC+2 (CEST)
- Postal code: 33086
- Dialing code: 0427
- Website: Official website

Montereale Valcellina (Friulian: Montreâl) is a comune (municipality) in the Regional decentralization entity of Pordenone in the northeast Italian region of Friuli-Venezia Giulia. The comune is located about 110 kilometres (68 mi) northwest of Trieste and about 20 kilometres (12 mi) north of Pordenone.

Montereale Valcellina borders the following municipalities: Andreis, Aviano, Barcis, Maniago, San Quirino.

== History ==
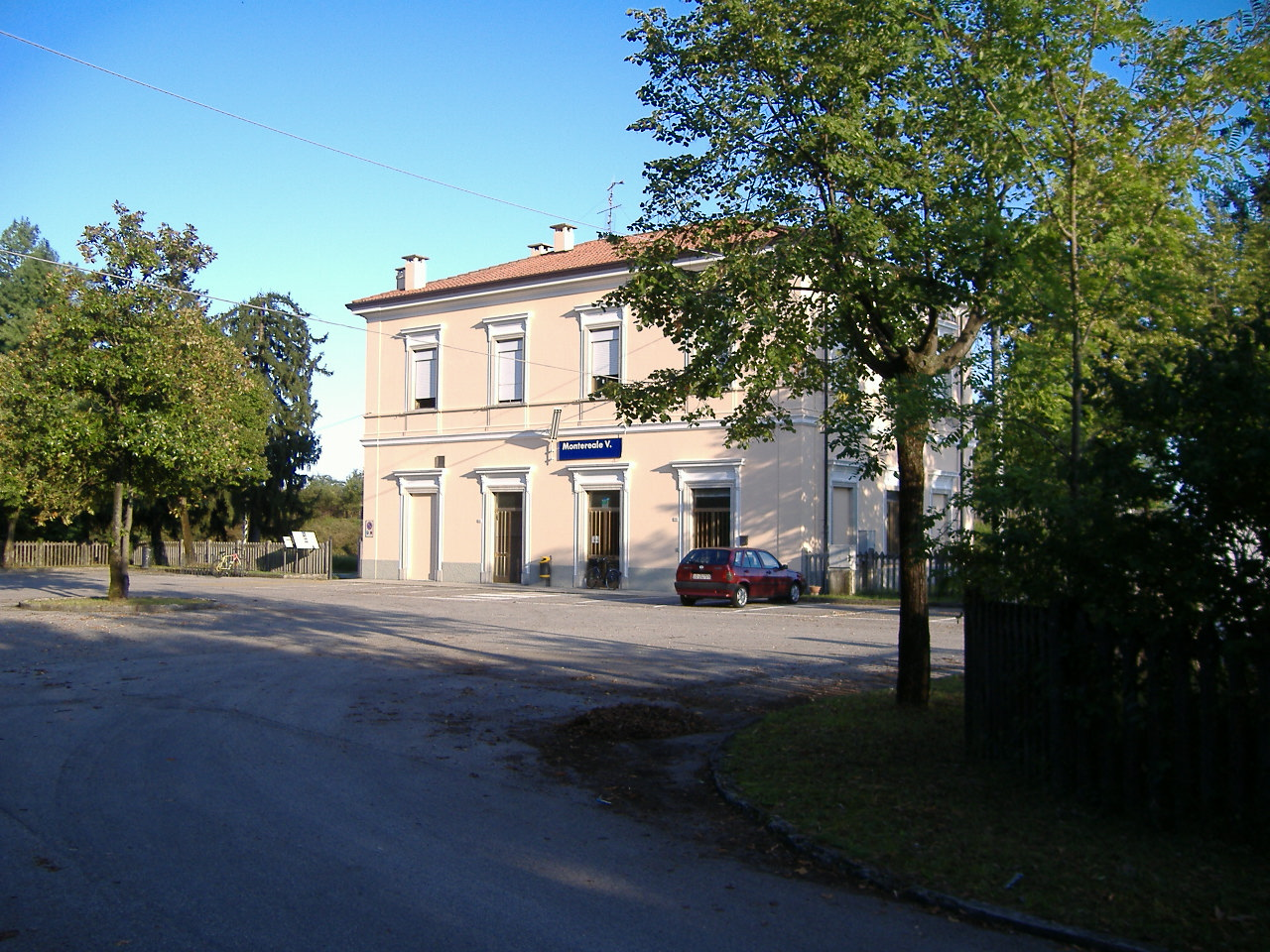
Montereale Valcellina station

Montereale was the birthplace (1532) of the miller and philosopher Menocchio, whom the historian Carlo Ginzburg discussed in his now-classic work of microhistory entitled, The Cheese and the Worms: The Cosmos of a Sixteenth-Century Miller, first published in Italian in 1976 and in English in 1980.

== Notable people ==
- Tommaso Toffoli, professor at Boston University
- Menocchio
