= Paul Ginsborg =

British historian (1945–2022)

- Born: Paul Anthony Ginsborg; 18 July 1945; London, Middlesex, England
- Died: 11 May 2022 (aged 76); Florence, Tuscany, Italy
- Occupation: Historian

Academic background
- Education: Queens' College, Cambridge

Academic work
- Institutions: University of Cambridge; University of Siena; University of Florence
- Main interests: Contemporary European History

Paul Anthony Ginsborg (18 July 1945 – 11 May 2022) was a British-born Italian historian. In the 1980s, he was Professor at the University of Siena; from 1992, he was Professor of Contemporary European History at the University of Florence.

== Education and activism ==
Ginsborg was educated at St Paul's School, London, and Queens' College, Cambridge, where he graduated with a BA degree in History in 1966. He was a Fellow of Churchill College, Cambridge, before later moving to work in Italy. With Pancho Pardi, he opposed Silvio Berlusconi's justice reforms, and campaigned alongside the girotondi movement.

== Law on Holocaust denial ==
Ginsborg was of Jewish parentage. Along with Carlo Ginzburg, Marcello Flores, Sergio Luzzatto, Claudio Pavone, Enzo Traverso, et al., he signed a call in January 2002 against a law project, presented by Justice Minister Clemente Mastella, to specifically penalize Holocaust denial. They argued that Italy's legislation was sufficient to cope with such acts. The amended law project finally restricted itself to reinforcing sentences concerning hate speech.

== Publications ==
- Daniele Manin e la rivoluzione veneziana del 1848-49, Milano, Feltrinelli, 1978; Torino, Einaudi, 2007. ISBN 978-88-06-14972-7.
- Storia d'Italia dal dopoguerra a oggi. Società e politica 1943-1988, 2 voll., Torino, Einaudi, 1989. ISBN 88-06-11386-0; Milano, Einaudi scuola, 1996. ISBN 88-286-0208-2.(In English: A History of Contemporary Italy: Society and Politics, 1943–1988, Macmillan 2003).
- Dialogo su Berlinguer, con Massimo D'Alema, Firenze, Giunti, 1994. ISBN 88-09-20545-6.
- Stato dell'Italia, a cura di, Milano, Il saggiatore-B. Mondadori, 1994. ISBN 88-428-0147-X.
- Le virtù della Repubblica. Conversazione a Formia, a cura di, Milano, Il saggiatore, 1994. ISBN 88-428-0209-3.
- Enti locali, società civile e famiglia nell'educazione in Toscana, a cura di e con Dario Ragazzini e Gastone Tassinari, Firenze, Edizioni Regione Toscana, 1996.
- L'Italia del tempo presente. Famiglia, società civile, Stato 1980-1996, Torino, Einaudi, 1998. ISBN 88-06-14595-9.
- Storia d'Italia 1943-1996. Famiglia, società, Stato, Torino, Einaudi, 1998. ISBN 88-06-14596-7.
- Un'Italia minore. Famiglia, istruzione e tradizioni civiche in Valdelsa, a cura di e con Francesco Ramella, Firenze, Giunti, 1999. ISBN 88-09-01457-X.
- Italy and its Discontents 1980-2001, Penguin, 2001.
- Berlusconi. Ambizioni patrimoniali in una democrazia mediatica, Torino, Einaudi, 2003. ISBN 88-06-16672-7.
- Il tempo di cambiare. Politica e potere della vita quotidiana, Torino, Einaudi, 2004. ISBN 88-06-16324-8.
- La democrazia che non c'è, Torino, Einaudi, 2006. ISBN 88-06-18540-3.
- Storia d'Italia. Annali, XXII, Il Risorgimento, a cura di e con Alberto Mario Banti, Torino, Einaudi, 2007. ISBN 978-88-06-16729-5.
- Salviamo l'Italia, Torino, Einaudi, 2010. ISBN 978-88-06-20226-2.
- Berlusconismo. Analisi di un sistema di potere, a cura di e con Enrica Asquer, Roma-Bari, Laterza, 2011. ISBN 978-88-420-9657-3.
- Family Politics: Domestic Life, Devastation and Survival, 1900–1950, New Haven and London, Yale University Press, 2014. ISBN 978-0-300-11211-5.
- Passions and Politics, with Sergio Labate (Polity, 2019).
