= Demetrius of Rostov =

Russian monk and saint (1651–1709)

Saint Demetrius of Rostov
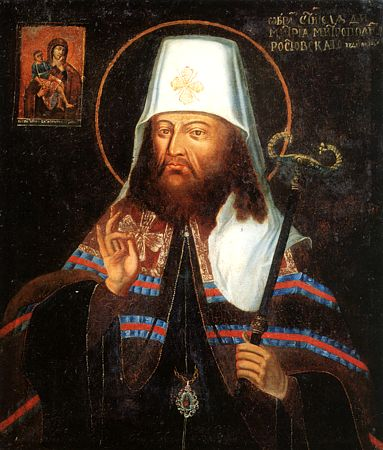
- Icon of St. Demetrius of Rostov, late 17th-century

Hierarch
- Born: 11 December 1651; Makariv, Cossack Hetmanate
- Died: 28 October 1709; Rostov, Tsardom of Russia
- Venerated in: Eastern Orthodox Church
- Canonized: 22 April 1757 by Russian Orthodox Church
- Feast: 21 September (Uncovering of Relics); 28 October (Repose); 23 May (Synaxis of All Saints of Rostov)
- Attributes: Vested as a bishop, right hand raised in blessing
- Patronage: students and teachers; Rostov-on-Don, Rostov the Great, Votkinsk

Demetrius of Rostov (Russian: Димитрий Ростовский, romanized: Dimitry Rostovsky, Ukrainian: Димитрій Ростовський, romanized: Dymytrii Rostovskyi, secular name Daniil Savvich Tuptalo, Russian: Даниил Саввич Туптало, or Tuptalenko, Russian: Тупталенко, according to some sources; 11 December 1651 – 28 October 1709) was a leading opponent of the Caesaropapist reform of the Russian Orthodox church promoted by Theophan Prokopovich. He is representative of the strong Cossack Baroque or Ukrainian Baroque influence upon the Russian Orthodox Church at the turn of the 17th and 18th centuries.

Demetrius is sometimes credited as composer or compiler of the first Russian opera, the lengthy Rostov Mysteries of 1705, though the exact nature of this work, as well as its place in history, is open to debate.

He is the author of several written works, out of which the most famous is The Lives of Saints (Четьи-Минеи). He was also involved in the creation of the forged document Synodic act on the heretic of Armenia, the monk Martin, which was used against the Old Believers.

== Life ==
He was born into a Cossack family in 1651. Soon thereafter his family moved to Kiev, and he entered the Kievo-Mohyla Academy at the age of 11. On 9 July 1668 he took his religious vows at St. Cyril's Monastery in Kiev and was given the monastic name of Demetrius (after Saint Demetrius of Thessalonika). After a brief period in Chernigov, Demetrius went to venerate the Byzantine Slavic Christian shrines of Belarus (at the time property of the Byzantine Rite Belarusian and Ukrainian Catholic metropolitans of the Uniate churches), still located in the Polish–Lithuanian Commonwealth at that time. In 1678 he returned from Vilno to Baturyn and settled at the court of the hetman Ivan Samoylovych.

During the 1680s, Demetrius lived mostly at the Kiev Pechersk Lavra, while his sermons against hard drinking and lax morals made his name known all over Russia. He was appointed hegumen (superior) of several major monasteries of Ukraine, but concentrated his attention upon the ambitious project of integrating all the lives of Russian saints into a single work, which he published as Monthly Readings (Четьи-минеи) or Menologion in 1684-1705. He also found time to study ecclesiastical history of the Russian Orthodox Church.

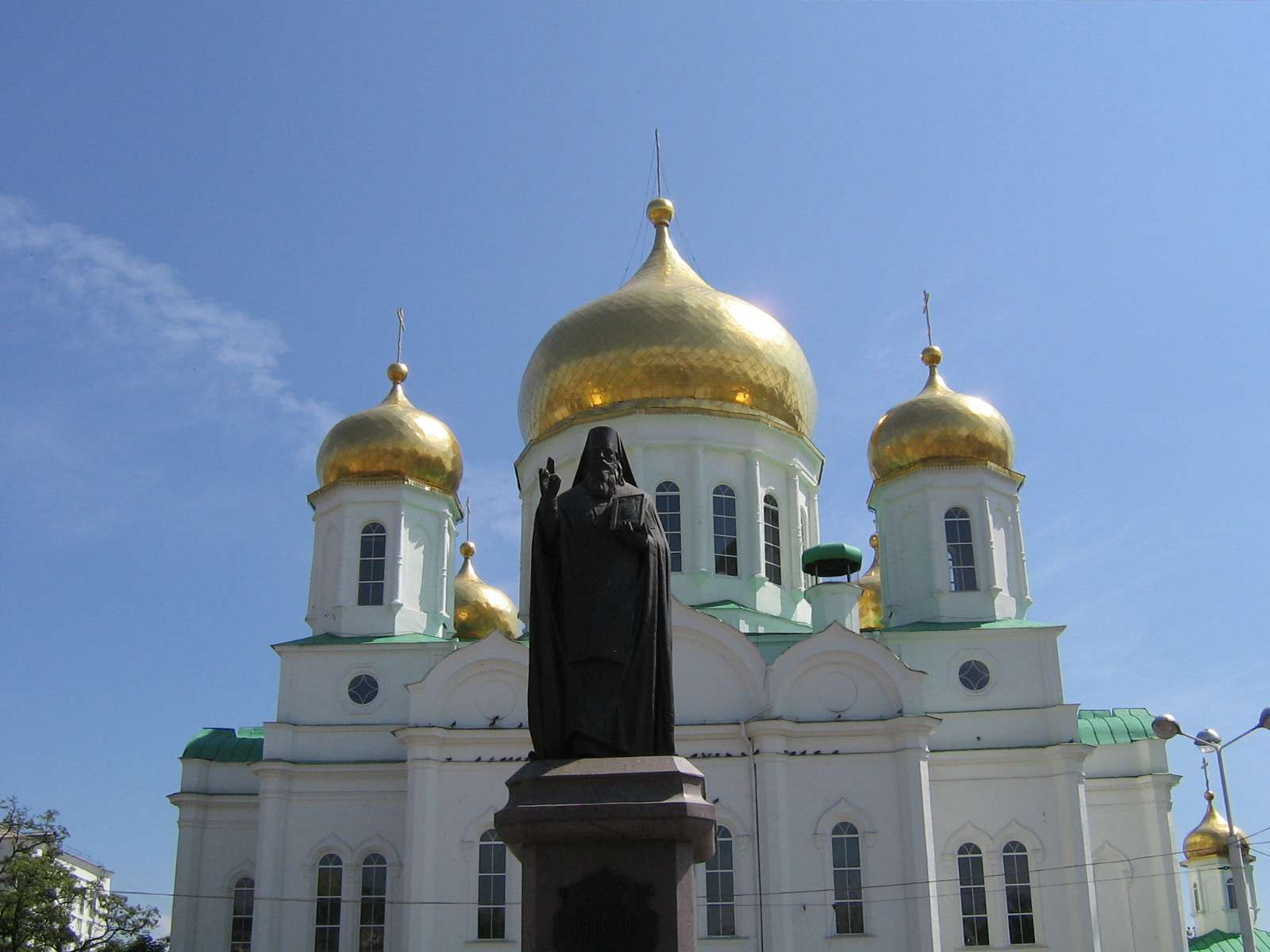
Statue of Demetrius of Rostov in front of the Rostov-on-Don cathedral.

In 1701 Demetrius was appointed Metropolitan of Siberia but, pleading ill health, preferred to stay in Moscow until he was invested with the archbishopric of Rostov. During his life in Russia, Demetrius opposed both the Old Believers' and Peter the Great's ecclesiastical policies, gradually drifting towards the party of Eudoxia Lopukhina and Tsarevich Alexis. Shortly before his death he forged the synodic act on the heretic of Armenia, the monk Martin, a document to undermine the Old Believers by portraying them as adherents of heresy. He also made contributions to Russian education, opening a school and a small theatre in Rostov, where his own plays could be staged.

== Work as composer ==
Demetrius was also active as a composer, although his musical education is undocumented aside from the standard music curriculum established by Feofan Prokopovich at the Kyiv-Mohyla Academy. Many of his Penitential Psalms achieved wide circulation, not only in Ukraine but in the Balkans too, and many have become an integral part of Ukrainian folk-song tradition through the kobzari, itinerant blind singers.

Demetrius is credited as composer or compiler of the first Russian opera, the six-hour-long Rostov Mysteries of 1705. Though this has been staged, notably by Boris Pokrovsky's Moscow Chamber Musical Theatre, in Moscow and at the Brighton Festival (1993), it may best be judged an oratorio on the lives of Russian saints. Its basis is the "Cheti-Minei" (Четьи-Минеи), published in four volumes in 1689, 1690, 1700 and 1705 — the same source that inspired Pushkin in 1825 to write Boris Godunov.

In one of Dimitri’s books called “Jesus Crucified: the Baroque Spirituality of St Dimitri of Rostov” he writes devotional texts, which showcase a western style of prayer evident in the Orthodox Church in Russia and more specifically in the saint himself. An example would be the line “Rejoice, heart ever-living, which for our sake was wounded by deathly sorrows, sadness and the lance.” This has prompted the sanctioning of the Divine Compassion of Our Lord Mass and Divine Office in the Western Rite Churches of the Antiochian Orthodox Vicariate This is differentiated from the Catholic Sacred Heart devotion and understood in an Orthodox light to just refer to the unending love and mercy of Christ for the faithful.

== Death ==
Upon Demetrius' death, on 28 October 1709, his relics were placed at St. Jacob's Monastery, which his followers would rebuild as Demetrius' shrine. A fortress on the Don River was named after him; today it is known as Rostov-on-the-Don.

Saint Demetrius of Rostov (18th-century painting from the Museum of Ukrainian Art in Kiev).

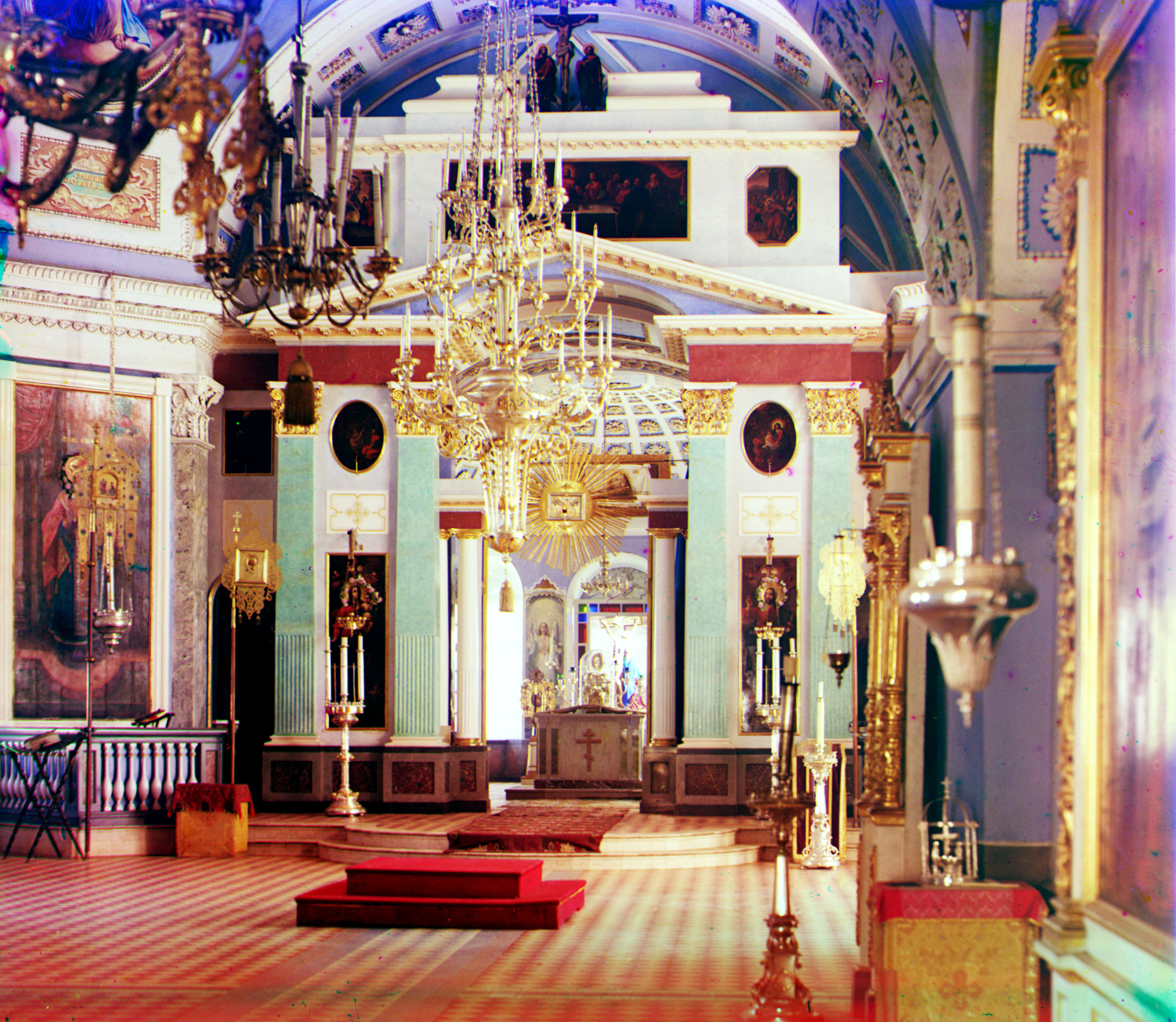
Church of St. Demetrius in Rostov (photo 1913).

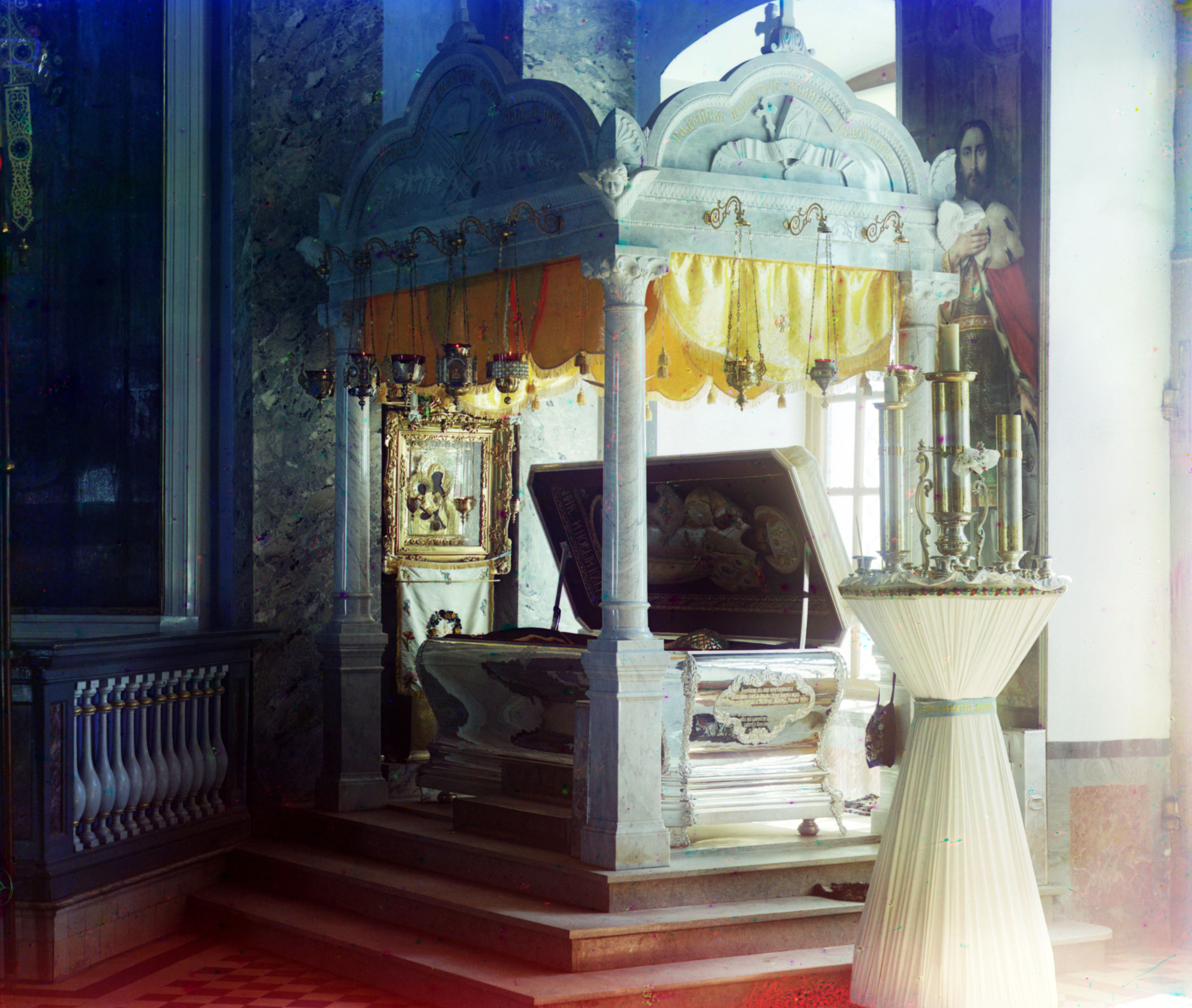
Reliquary with Dmitry's remains (photo 1913).

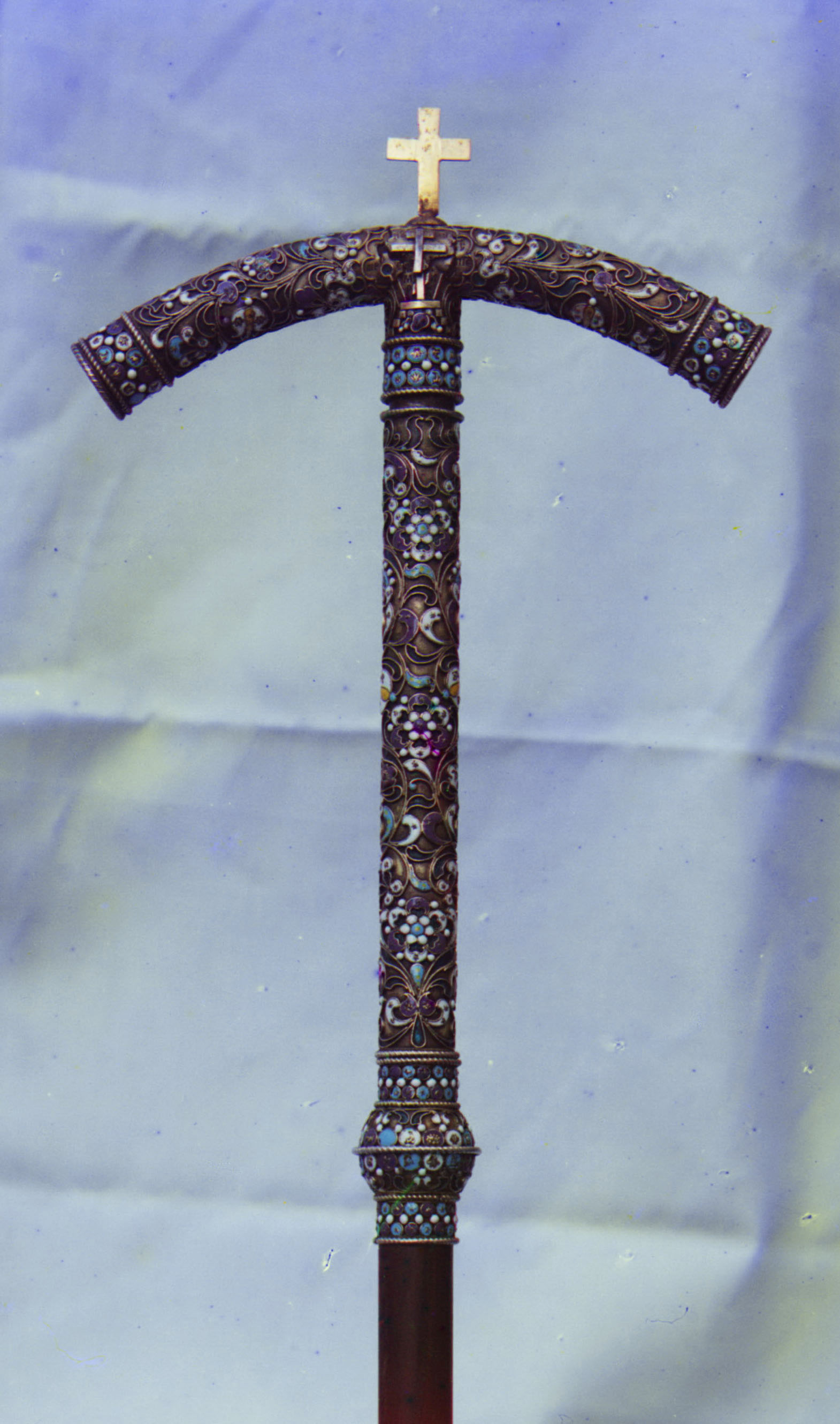
Crozier of Demetrius of Rostov (photo 1913).

== Works and further reading ==
- Апология во утоление печали человека, сущего в беде, гонении и озлоблении (An apology to assuage the sorrow of a person in distress, persecution, and bitterness)
- Благодарственное страстей Христовых воспоминание и молитвенное размышление, паче оных молитв зело полезное, еже должно во все пятки совершати (A grateful remembrance and prayerful meditation on the Passion of Christ—exceedingly beneficial, surpassing other prayers—which ought to be observed every Friday)
- Руно орошенное (The Dew-Laden Fleece)
- Жития Святых (Lives of the Saints)
- Розыск о раскольнической брынской вере (An Inquiry into the Schismatic Brynsk Faith)
- Летопись, повествующая о деяниях от начала миробытия до Рождества Христова (A chronicle recounting events from the beginning of the world to the Nativity of Christ)
- John Mikitish, Jesus Crucified: The Baroque Spirituality of St Dimitri of Rostov (St. Vladimir's Seminary Press, 2017) ISBN 9780881415780
