= The Great Cat Massacre =

Book by Robert Darnton

- First edition
- Author: Robert Darnton
- Original title: The Great Cat Massacre and Other Episodes in French Cultural History
- Subject: Early modern France
- Genre: Histoire des mentalités, Cultural History
- Published: 1984
- Publisher: Basic Books
- Publication place: United States
- ISBN: 0-465-02700-8
- OCLC: 749134561
- LC Class: DC33.4 D37 1984

The Great Cat Massacre and Other Episodes in French Cultural History is an influential collection of essays on the cultural history of early modern France by the American historian Robert Darnton, first published in 1984. The book's title is derived from its most famous chapter which describes and interprets an unusual source detailing the "massacre" of cats by apprentice printers living and working on Rue Saint-Séverin in Paris during the late 1730s. Other chapters look at fairy tales, the writing of the Encyclopédie and other aspects of French early modern history.

== Methodology ==
Darnton, influenced by Clifford Geertz who was a colleague of Darnton's and had pioneered the approach of "thick description" in cultural anthropology, aimed to gain greater insight into the period and social groups involved by studying what he perceived to be something which appeared alien to the late modern mind – the fact that killing cats might be funny.

The Great Cat Massacre and Other Episodes in French Cultural History, the book containing this account, has become one of Darnton's most popular writings; it has been published in eighteen languages.

Darnton describes how, as the apprentices suffered grueling working conditions, they came to resent the privileges which their masters gave to their cats, and devised a plan to deal with the pompous pets by slaughtering them with the intention of discomforting their masters. Darnton interprets this as an early form of workers' protest. (As may the wife in the story, who says she believes that "they were threatened by a more serious kind of insubordination" beyond the simple stoppage of work.)

The cats were a favourite of the printer's wife and were fed much better than the apprentices, who were in turn served "catfood" (rotting meat scraps). Aside from this, they were mistreated, beaten and exposed to cold and horrible weather. One of the apprentices imitated a cat by screaming like one for several nights, making the printer and his wife despair. Finally, the printer ordered the cats rounded up and dispatched. The apprentices did this, rounded up all the cats they could find, beat them half to death and held a 'trial'. They found the cats guilty of witchcraft and sentenced them to death by hanging. Darnton concluded:

The joke worked so well because the workers played so skillfully with a repertory of ceremonies and symbols. Cats suited their purposes perfectly. By smashing the spine of la grise they called the master's wife a witch and a slut, while at the same time making the master into a cuckold and a fool. It was metonymic insult, delivered by actions, not words, and it struck home because cats occupied a soft spot in the bourgeois way of life. Keeping pets was as alien to the workers as torturing animals was to the bourgeois. Trapped between incompatible sensitivities, the cats had the worst of both worlds.

Darnton's approach to the historical texts he uses, both in the Cat Massacre chapter and others in the volume, has been criticised since shortly after the work's appearance for its simplistic assumptions. An early exchange between Darnton and French cultural historian Roger Chartier was subjected to a scathing analysis by Dominic LaCapra of the 'Great Symbol Massacre' involved. Harold Mah in 1991 focused directly on Darnton's account of the 'Massacre', arguing ultimately that the author had 'suppressed' the actual nature of the source in pursuit of an engaging interpretation.

== See also ==
- List of common misconceptions about the Middle Ages
- The Cheese and the Worms (1976), by Carlo Ginzburg
- "Culture of popular laughter", a concept in early modern cultural history
