= Byron Darnton =

American reporter, war correspondent (1897–1942)

- Born: November 8, 1897; Adrian, Michigan, U.S.
- Died: October 18, 1942 (aged 44); Pongani, New Guinea
- Cause of death: Killed in action
- Education: University of Michigan
- Occupations: Reporter; war correspondent
- Spouse: Eleanor Choate Darnton
- Children: John Darnton; Robert Darnton
- Relatives: Charles Darnton

Byron Darnton (November 8, 1897 – October 18, 1942) was an American reporter and war correspondent for The New York Times in the Pacific theater during World War II.

He was killed in 1942 by a bomb dropped from an American B-25 Mitchell bomber, the tenth American war correspondent killed in action in the war. Darnton's work in reporting on the war in the Pacific was respected by military officials, including General Douglas MacArthur, who personally reported Darnton's death to the Times and Darnton's widow.

== Journalism career ==
Darnton was born November 8, 1897, in Adrian, Michigan. His interest in journalism began in adolescence, when he and his family visited his uncle Charles Darnton, a drama critic for Joseph Pulitzer's Evening World in New York, New York. After leaving high school in 1917, Darnton joined the American Expeditionary Force and served in World War I, before returning to the United States and entering the University of Michigan, where he joined the fraternity of Sigma Phi.

The Sandusky Herald in Sandusky, Ohio, provided Darnton's entry to the newspaper industry; he followed this with a stint at The Baltimore Sun. Darnton also provided several short stories to The Smart Set magazine, then edited by H.L. Mencken, who attempted to convince Darnton to shift his attention to writing fiction. Instead, Darnton went on to write for the Philadelphia Bulletin and Philadelphia Evening Ledger, then in 1925 moved to the New York Post, where his work on the rewrite desk earned him the sobriquet, "the all-American rewrite man". Then, after a period as the Associated Press city editor in New York, he joined the staff of The New York Times in 1934.

== With The New York Times ==
At The New York Times, Darnton was selected to establish the newspaper's “Review of the Week” section for a time, but in 1939 returned to reporting, and in 1940 began roving assignments that took him around the United States and eventually into the Pacific theater. During that period, he was married to Eleanor Choate and had two sons.

His first overseas assignment was in February 1941, when he was among the first correspondents to leave the United States for Australia. Once there, he took the first opportunity to move to forward bases in New Guinea, where the United States 32nd Infantry Division had been designated to be one of the first U.S. units to attack the Japanese. Darnton had served with the 32nd Infantry Division during World War I and was looking forward to reporting its operations in World War II. He was based near Port Moresby and his reporting included his characteristic wit through amusing anecdotes related by servicemen, and discussed the mood of the troops on the ground and their thoughts regarding the war and its future.

On October 18, 1942, Darnton was aboard the King John, a seventy-foot wooden trawler of the Small Ships Section of U.S. Army Services of Supply SWPA that was also carrying 102 troops of the 128th Infantry, off the coast of Pongani in New Guinea when a B-25 mistook the ships for Japanese vessels and bombed and strafed them. Darnton, suffering a shrapnel head wound, died in a boat on the way to shore and Lt. Adam Bruce Fahnestock, prewar South Seas explorer and then head of the Small Ships Section, hit in the spine, died in the arms of the King John's severely wounded Australian Chief Engineer moments after reaching shore.

His notebook, which was taken from his body by a fellow correspondent and returned to his son, Pulitzer Prize-winning journalist John Darnton in 1976, ended with a question about the bomber that would end his life: “Jap or ours?”

Darnton's passing was marked by many other journalists and officials, including General Douglas MacArthur, who wired to The Times that “He served with gallantry and devotion at the front and fulfilled the important duties of war correspondent with distinction to himself and The New York Times and with value to his country.” Major General Edwin F. Harding of the 32nd Infantry Division wrote that, "Everyone hereabouts is distressed over the death of Darnton and [Lt. A. B.] Fahnestock. I knew Darnton quite well... and considered him one damn good correspondent and swell guy. He was hot to be on the spot for the first contact of American Army ground troops with the Japs. I told him that this would probably be it and gave him permission to go." Darnton was buried with full military honors at an Australian-American cemetery outside Port Moresby. Darnton and Fahnestock were buried side by side with British, Australian and American war correspondents acting as pall bearers.

== The Byron Darnton ==
In 1943, a 10,500-ton Liberty ship was christened with Darnton's name in Baltimore, Maryland. The ship was launched by his widow Eleanor and her sons, John and Bob. Bob wrote his name on the hull in crayon. Both sons followed in their father's footsteps and became journalists. John Darnton joined The New York Times as a copy boy in 1966 and went on to work for The New York Times for four decades. He received the Pulitzer Prize in 1982 for his coverage of Poland under martial law when he smuggled stories out of the country. Robert later became a renowned cultural historian. The ship sailed a regular run to Murmansk through the remainder of the war. On March 16, 1946, the Byron Darnton ran aground in an easterly gale off the coast of Sanda Island in the North Channel off the coast of Scotland. In 2003, a pub was opened on Sanda Island named the Byron Darnton. The owner says it is one of the two most remote pubs in the country. Remains of the shipwreck can still be seen at low tide.

== Famous quote ==
While author Leo Rosten is usually credited with the popular phrase “No man who hates dogs and children can be all bad,” used by him to describe comedian W. C. Fields, Darnton was in fact the first to use this phrase regarding an unknown man named Gastonbury. Darnton used it in 1930 after a New York cocktail party, which was later reported in Harper's Monthly in 1937, two years before Leo Rosten used it at a banquet.
