= The Forbidden Best-Sellers of Pre-Revolutionary France =

1996 book by Robert Darnton

- First edition
- Author: Robert Darnton
- Language: English
- Subject: Literary criticism
- Publisher: W. W. Norton
- Publication date: 1996
- Publication place: United States
- Media type: Print
- ISBN: 978-0393314427

The Forbidden Best-Sellers of Pre-Revolutionary France is a 1996 book by literary scholar Robert Darnton. Darnton maps the "forbidden sector" of eighteenth-century French literature, using archival records that showed the popularity of books suppressed by the French Ancien Régime of Loius XIV through XVI including those on enlightenment philosophy, erotica, utopian literature, and a popular genre of slanderous political works. In 1995, the book won the National Book Critics Circle Award for Criticism.

== Overview ==
Darnton traces the channels of the eighteenth-century French underground book trade using archival records preserved from the Société Typographique de Neuchâtel, a publisher and wholesaler that supplied books and pamphlets to the French market from the Swiss principality of Neuchâtel. Darnton discusses the nature of the forbidden works, the reasons for their popularity, and the role they played in French literary, social, and political life. The forbidden works included pornographic novels, utopian works, and the genre of political slander. Darnton's text includes numerous charts and illustrations that support his argument. Darnton concludes his essay by speculating about the role the dissemination of these forbidden texts may have played in setting the stage for the French Revolution.

His book also includes an addendum that includes large excerpts (translated to English) of the following 18th century "best sellers":

- Thérèse Philosophe
- 'L'An Deux Mille Quatre Cent Quarante, Rêve s'il en Fût Jamais' ('The Year 2440: A Dream If Ever There Was One')
- Anecdotes sur Mme. la Comtesse du Barry

== Reception ==
The Forbidden Best-Sellers of Pre-Revolutionary France was widely reviewed in the academic press.

Mark Curran, writing in The Historical Journal, praised Darnton, saying "Robert Darnton's contributions to the fields of pre-revolutionary French history, book history, sociology, the history of ideas and, more recently, digital humanities have been profound and inspirational."

Curren went on to summarize the reasons for the book's importance. "Robert Darnton's acclaimed 1995 work on the late eighteenth-century illegal book trade, The Forbidden Best-Sellers of Pre-Revolutionary France, has become one of the most cited and studied texts in its field. The culmination of thirty years' archival reflection, it roots Darnton's previous case-study-driven articles and monographs in a wide-ranging empirical survey of the order books of the Swiss printer-booksellers, the Société Typographique Neuchätel. It claims to offer readers a picture of what illegal books went into bookshops everywhere in pre-revolutionary France."

Jack R. Censer in The American Historical Review gave the book high praise. "Superbly and boldly written, this book is an important statement by a very eminent scholar," Censer wrote. "[M]any basic issues are delineated and debated with exceptional grace and clarity; much valuable information is presented; specialists and non-specialists will profit by viewing and evaluating it."

Katherine Gantz in The Antioch Review described the book's merits as follows: "Darnton's provocative work looks beyond the canon, to a potent, yet rarely studied source of cultural information: the issues and interests contained in books banned by the Old Regime, but actively circulated in the illegal book market. Blasphemous philosophical tracts, pornographic novels, and anti-monarchist political essays all contributed to this body of forbidden literature." Gantz concluded: "Darnton's deft approach to his subject combines the rigors of historical research with a useful materialist analysis of the publishing trade."

Malcolm Cook in The Modern Language Review wrote that "without his pioneering work over a period of about twenty-five years, our knowledge of the book trade in the final years of the ancien regime would be little indeed." Cook went on to say, "Darnton claims that his objective is 'understanding the demand for forbidden books and the means of transmitting and satisfying it.' There is no doubt, in my opinion, that this objective is achieved."

Jeremy D. Popkin in The Journal of Modern History, noting the importance of Darnton's earlier work on the same topic, expressed reservations about Darnton's achievement in Forbidden Best-Sellers. "The print culture of eighteenth-century France was too extensive and too diverse to allow us to single out any one element as decisive in causing the Revolution. Few scholars have done as much over the years to alert us to the extent of that diversity as Robert Darnton. Forbidden Best-Sellers, rather than extending and synthesizing his earlier work, seems to turn its back on Darnton's own most original insights and the findings that other scholars inspired by his work have come to."

John Lough in Romanische Forschungen concluded "One may greatly admire Darnton's brilliant researches into the underground book trade without being able to accept some of the conclusions which he draws from them."

== See also ==
- French Revolution
- Utopian and dystopian fiction
- Libertine novel

== Sources ==
- Censer, Jack R. (October 1996). "Review of The Forbidden Best-Sellers of Pre-Revolutionary France by Robert Darnton". The American Historical Review. 101 (4): 1220–1221. doi:10.2307/2169717. JSTOR 2169717.
- Cook, Malcolm (January 1997). "Review of The Forbidden Best-Sellers of Pre-Revolutionary France by Robert Darnton". The Modern Language Review. 92 (1). Modern Humanities Research Association: 190–191. doi:10.2307/3734730. JSTOR 3734730.
- Curran, Mark (March 2013). "Beyond The Forbidden Best-Sellers of Pre-Revolutionary France". The Historical Journal. 56 (1): 89–112. doi:10.1017/S0018246X12000556. JSTOR 23352217. S2CID 159510801.
- Darnton, Robert (1996). The Forbidden Best-Sellers of Pre-Revolutionary France. New York: W. W. Norton. ISBN 978-0393314427.
- Gantz, Katherine (Autumn 1996). "Review of The Forbidden Best-Sellers of Pre-Revolutionary France by Robert Darnton". The Antioch Review. 54 (4): 489–490. JSTOR 4613418.
- Lough, John (1998). "Review of The Forbidden Best-Sellers of Pre-Revolutionary France by Robert Darnton". Romanische Forschungen. 110. Bd. (H. 1). Vittorio Klostermann GmbH: 97–99. JSTOR 27941068.
- Popkin, Jeremy (March 1997). "Review of The Forbidden Best-Sellers of Pre-Revolutionary France by Robert Darnton". The Journal of Modern History. 69 (1). The University of Chicago Press: 154–157. doi:10.1086/245466. JSTOR 2953458.
