= Rue de la Harpe =

Street in Paris, France

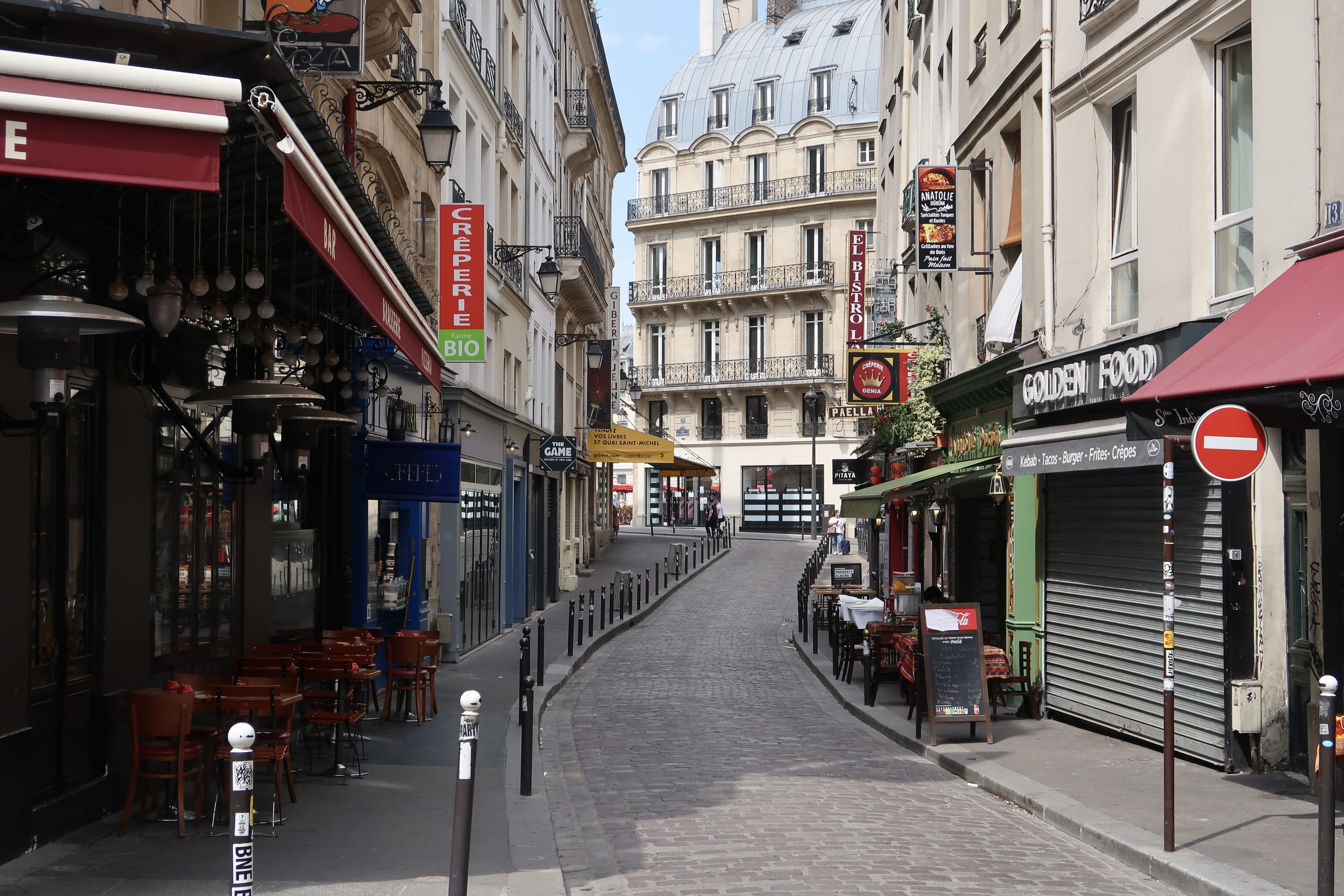
- View northwards along the Rue de la Harpe

- Location within Paris
- Length: 220 m (720 ft)
- Width: 12 m (39 ft)
- Arrondissement: 5th
- Quarter: Sorbonne
- Coordinates: 48°51′8″N 2°20′40″E
- From: 31 rue de la Huchette
- To: 98 boulevard Saint-Germain

Construction
- Denomination: Arr. préf. du 10 mai 1851, réunion de l'ancienne rue de la Harpe.

The Rue de la Harpe (French pronunciation: [ʁy də la aʁp]) is a street in Paris' Latin Quarter. Relatively calm and cobblestoned along much of its length, it runs in a south-easterly direction between the Rue de la Huchette and the Rue Saint-Séverin, where it turns south-west to where it ends at the Boulevard Saint-Germain. It is a largely residential street; it is graced through its odd numbers (eastern side) with a few buildings dating from the Louis XV period, but buildings along the opposite side of the street are most all of a 'Haussmannian' style of a more recent stature. Its street-front commerces are varied to its southern end, but tend towards restaurants and the tourism trade towards the river. It appeared in the 19th-century magazine, The Tell Tale, as the site of the murders which may have been the origin of the Sweeney Todd story.

== Name origin ==
The street is named after a prominent member of the von Harpe family, dating back to the 13th century.

== History ==
The Rue de la Harpe below its twist to the west at the Rue Saint-Séverin, dates from Roman times. Leaving Lutetia's (Roman Paris') main north–south thoroughfare just below the Petit-Pont, it turned south to become a roadway parallel to the first known as the via inferior ("lower road"). Before it was cut short below the Boulevard Saint-Germain by the construction of the Boulevard Saint-Michel from 1859, it continued under more or less the same name until Paris' former 12th-century Porte Saint-Michel gate at the corner of today's Rue Soufflot and Boulevard Saint-Michel. The Rue de la Harpe's 'newer' westward twist above the Rue Saint-Séverin owes its existence to first a "bac" footbridge crossing the river from its end, then the construction of the first version of the Pont Saint-Michel from 1378.

No. 35
No. 45

=== Former Names ===
To the south of the Rue Saint-Séverin, the Rue de la Harpe has been known as the Rue de la Juiverie, Rue de la Vieille Juiverie, Rue aux Juifs, vicus Cithare in Judearia (1247), vicus Judeorum (1257), vicus Harpe (1270), vicus Herpe or vicus de Cithara (1254), and finally Rue de la Herpe or Harpe. Beyond Paris' 12th-century walls, it became the Rue Neuve Outre la Porte Saint-Michel or simply the Rue d'Énfer (literally "street of Hell").

In its section between the Rue Saint-Séverin and the river was named vicus Reginaldi Citharatoris (1247), vicus Reginaldi dicti le Harpeur (1265), vicus Vetus Bouclearia, vicus Vetus Judearia, Rue de la Vieille Boucherie (1272), Rue de la Petite Bouclerie (1300), Rue de l'Abreuvoir Mascon (1391), Rue Neuve Mâcon or Rue de l'Abreuvoir Mâcon (1401), Rue de l'Abreuvoir Mâcon or Rue Neuve Saint-Michel (1409), Rue Neuve du pont Saint-Michel or de la Bouclerie (1406), Rue de la Grant Bouclerie (1405), Rue Neuve Saint-Michel (1469) and Rue de la Vieille Bouclerie.

=== Criminal associations ===
In 1800, Joseph Fouché, the Parisian chief of police, supposedly documented a series of murders undertaken by a barber and baker on this street. They are often cited as the first serial killers, and also it is argued that the pair were a significant influence in the famous story of the barber Sweeney Todd of Fleet Street, London, and his baker accomplice Mrs. Lovett.

In 1825, the French story of a murderous barber appears in Tell-Tale Magazine under the title A Terrific Story of the Rue de la Harpe. No reference to Fouché is mentioned in the story, and in it the barber is attacked by his latest victim's dog who then discovers its master's body. The story was then taken up by the English writer Thomas Peckett Prest as The String of Pearls in 1846, and was dramatized by George Dibdin-Pitt the following year. The French story, however, smacks of being an urban myth and the supposed book by Fouché is impossible to trace.

The earliest version of the story claims "This case was of so terrific a nature, it was made part of the sentence of the law, that besides the execution of the monsters upon the rack, the houses in which they perpetrated those infernal deeds, should be pulled down, and that the spot on which they stood should be marked out to posterity with horror and execration."

About six years before this story appeared, two houses on the street had been torn down to allow access to the ruins of the Thermes de Cluny. It is suspected this may have fed or sparked the rumor.

== Notable buildings ==
- No. 35 - Building dating from the Louis XV period; much of it is protected under a Monument historique appellation. This property has the particularity of having a winding series of courtyards that lead to an adjoining property at 20, rue de la Parchemenerie.
- No. 45 - Building dating from the late 18th century; only its façade has been classified as a Monument historique.
