= Heresiarch =

Christian theological term for someone who propagates heretical doctrine

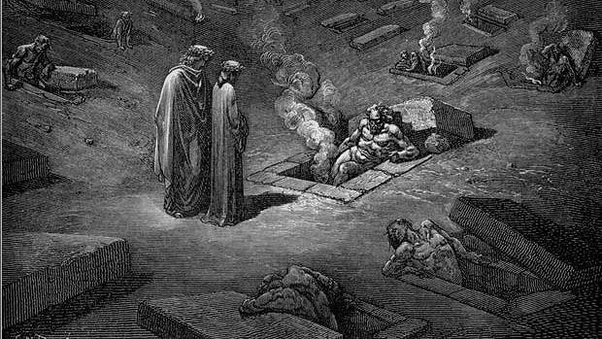
In this Gustave Dore engraving, Dante and Virgil speak to a Heresiarch trapped within a burning tomb. Dante placed arch-heretics in the Sixth Circle of Hell.

In Christian theology, a heresiarch (also hæresiarch, according to the Oxford English Dictionary; from Greek: αἱρεσιάρχης, hairesiárkhēs via the late Latin haeresiarcha) or arch-heretic is an originator of heretical doctrine or the founder of a sect that sustains such a doctrine.

== List of heresiarchs ==
- Nicholas of Antioch, one of the Seven Deacons, founder of Nicolaism, condemned in the Book of Revelation. 1st century
- Simon Magus, the purported founder of Gnosticism. 1st century
- Montanus, founder of Montanism, mid to late 2nd century
- Theodotus of Byzantium, propounder of Adoptionism, late 2nd century
- Valentinus, founder of Valentinianism, 2nd century
- Sabellius, founder of Sabellianism, 3rd century
- Marcion, founder of Marcionism, 2nd century
- Basilides, founder of Basilidianism, 2nd century
- Novatian, founder of Novatianism, condemned by Pope Cornelius. 3rd century
- Arius, founder of Arianism, condemned by the 1st council of Nicaea. 3rd and 4th centuries
- Donatus Magnus, founder of Donatism, condemned by Augustine of Hippo. 4th century
- Apollinaris of Laodicea, founder of Apollinarianism, condemned at the 1st Council of Constantinople. 4th century,
- John Philoponus (6th century), founder of tritheism, condemned at the 3rd Council of Constantinople
- Macedonius I of Constantinople, founder of Macedonianism, condemned at the 1st Council of Constantinople. 4th century
- Aëtius & Eunomius, leaders of Anomoeanism, condemned at the 1st Council of Constantinople. 4th century
- Bonosus of Serdica, propounder of Antidicomerianism, condemned by Augustine of Hippo. 4th century
- Priscillian, founder of Priscillianism, condemned by the 1st Council of Braga. 4th century
- Pelagius, founder of Pelagianism, condemned by Augustine of Hippo. 4th century
- Sergius I of Constantinople, founder of monoenergism, condemned by the 3rd Council of Constantinople 7th century
- Pope Honorius I, Pyrrhus of Constantinople, Paul II of Constantinople, Peter of Constantinople - all condemned posthumously with the still living Macarius of Antioch by the 3rd Council of Constantinople for promoting monothelitism. 7th century
- Augustine of Hippo posthumously refers to Mani, the founder of Manichaeism, as a heresiarch.
- Nestorius, Theodore of Mopsuestia & Ibas of Edessa condemned as heresiarchs - the former by the Council of Ephesus, the latter 2 posthumously at the 2nd Council of Constantinople over the Controversy of Three Chapters, for promoting Nestorianism, but venerated in Church of the East denominations. 5th century
- Dioscorus of Alexandria & Severus of Antioch, condemned as heresiarchs by the Council of Chalcedon, for allegedly promoting monophysitism espoused by Eutyches, thereby causing the Chalcedonian schism, but the Oriental Orthodox Churches disagree with this interpretation, stating that they believed not in monophysitism, but in miaphysitism as stated by Cyril of Alexandria in contrast to the dyophisitism espoused by Pope Leo I. 5th and 6th century
- Photius of Constantinople, condemned as a heresiarch, due to the Photian schism at the Fourth Council of Constantinople. The Eastern Orthodox Church counters this by labelling Pope Nicholas I as a heresiarch due to the filioque in their own council. 9th century
- Menocchio, an Italian miller who was burned at the stake in 1599
- Catholics, especially traditionalist Catholics such as Hilaire Belloc, consider Martin Luther, John Calvin, and other leaders of the Protestant Reformation to be arch-heretics, in accordance to the decrees of the Council of Trent.
- Conversely, some fundamentalist Protestants (including Alexander Hislop and Charles Chiniquy) have used the term to refer to the papacy and the members of the Roman Curia.
- Martin of Armenia, the fictional founder of the Old Russian Rite used by the Old Believers

== Dante's Inferno ==
In his Divine Comedy, Dante Alighieri represents the heresiarchs as being immured in tombs of fire in the Sixth Circle of Hell. In Cantos IX and X of the Inferno, Virgil describes the suffering these souls experience, saying "Here are the Arch-Heretics, surrounded by every sect their followers... / Like with like is buried, and the monuments are different in degrees of heat." Among the historical figures that Dante specifically lists as arch-heretics are Epicurus, Farinata Degli Uberti, Frederick II of Sicily, and Pope Anastasius II.

== See also ==
- List of Christian heresies
- Heresy in Christianity
