= John Darnton =

American journalist, author (born 1941)

- Born: November 20, 1941 (age 84); New York City, U.S.
- Education: University of Wisconsin–Madison
- Occupations: Journalist; author
- Notable credit(s): New York Times; Neanderthal, The Experiment, Mind Catcher, The Darwin Conspiracy (novels)
- Father: Byron Darnton
- Relatives: Robert Darnton (brother); David Grann (son-in-law)

John Darnton (born November 20, 1941) is an American journalist who wrote for the New York Times. He is a two-time winner of the Polk Award, of which he is now the curator, and the 1982 Pulitzer Prize for International Reporting. He also moonlights as a novelist, writing scientific and medical thrillers.

== Journalism ==
After graduating from the University of Wisconsin–Madison, Darnton joined The New York Times as a copyboy in 1966. Two years later, he became a reporter and for the next eight years he worked in and around New York City, including stints as the Connecticut correspondent during the Black Panther trials in New Haven, and as a City Hall reporter in the Lindsay and Beame administrations.

In 1976, he went abroad as a foreign correspondent, first covering Africa out of Lagos, Nigeria, and then, when the military government there expelled him in 1977, out of Nairobi, Kenya. He covered protests in South Africa, liberation movements in Rhodesia, guerrilla fighting in Ethiopia, Somalia, Zaire, and the fall of Idi Amin in Uganda. His work in Africa earned him the George Polk Award in 1978.

In 1979, based in Warsaw, Poland, he covered Eastern Europe for the Times and received both the Polk Award and the 1982 Pulitzer Prize for International Reporting for his coverage of Poland under martial law and the rise of the Solidarity movement (he had to smuggle dispatches out of the country). He went on to become the bureau chief in Madrid and London and also served as the deputy foreign editor, the metropolitan editor, and the cultural news editor at the Times. He retired from the Times in 2005.

== Novels ==
In addition to his work as a journalist, Darnton moonlighted as a fiction writer, ultimately publishing a memoir and six novels "notable for their sinister themes and exotic settings, for overcooked plots that seemed custom-made for Hollywood".

Since his initial success, Darnton has continued his fiction writing, in general sticking to thrillers with scientific and historical narratives:

- Neanderthal (1996), an overnight bestseller about a Harvard archeologist who goes missing
- The Experiment (1999), a "riveting medical thriller" whose plot involves cloning and life extension
- Mind Catcher (2002) deals with artificial intelligence and human consciousness
- The Darwin Conspiracy (2005) takes place in Victorian-era England and explores the life and work of Charles Darwin
- Black & White & Dead All Over (2008) is a roman à clef about a string of murders at a newspaper that is equal parts "page turner and media satire"
- . Burning Sky (2024) is a thriller set today and the immediate future in which three generations deal with a misbegotten scheme to control global warming.

== Retirement ==
After retiring from the Times in 2005, Darnton began teaching journalism as a visiting professor at the State University of New York at New Paltz. In 2009, John Darnton was named curator of the George Polk Awards in 2008.

== Personal life ==
In 2011, he forayed into nonfiction, publishing Almost a Family, a memoir about growing up without a father that also dealt heavily with alcoholism. His father Byron "Barney" Darnton had been a New York Times war correspondent until he was killed off the coast of New Guinea while covering the Pacific War during World War II, when John was 11 months old and his brother Robert (now a renowned cultural historian) was three years old.
