= Neanderthal (novel) =

1996 novel by John Darnton

- First edition cover
- Author: John Darnton
- Language: English
- Genre: Techno-thriller, Novel
- Publisher: Random House
- Publication date: April 1996
- Publication place: United States
- Media type: Print (Hardback & Paperback)
- Pages: 368 p. (hardback edition) & 395 p. (paperback edition)
- ISBN: 0-679-44978-7 (hardback edition) & ISBN 0-312-96300-9 (paperback edition)
- OCLC: 34284189
- Dewey Decimal: 813/.54 20
- LC Class: PS3554.A727 N43 1996

Neanderthal is an American novel written by John Darnton published by Random House in 1996.

== Plot ==
The plot of Neanderthal revolves around two rival scientists, Matt Mattison and Susan Arnot, who are sent by the United States government to search for missing Harvard anthropologist James Kellicut. Their only clue is the skull of a Neanderthal. Carbon dating shows that the skull, which should be 40,000 years old, is suspiciously only 25 years old.

The Russian and American governments are competing to study the surviving Neanderthals in Tajikistan in order to learn more about their "remote viewing" capabilities. The Neanderthals are split into two tribes, a peaceful valley tribe and a cannibalistic and violent mountain tribe. Soon, the protagonists are captured by Neanderthals and must try to escape from the cannibals. They hope to do so without jeopardizing the safety of the peaceful tribe. It eventually, however, becomes necessary to train the peaceful tribe for war. The novel explains that a completely peaceful society like that was doomed in any case, and would have been destroyed soon by the mountain tribe.

== Characters ==
- Matt Mattison – protagonist, a scientist
- Susan Arnot – Mattison's scientific rival and former lover
- James Kellicut – an anthropologist who has gone missing
- Van Steeds – Scientist and representative of Institute of Prehistoric Studies
- Eagleton – Head of Institute of Prehistoric studies and using Mattison and Arnot
- Rudy – Russian-Tajik guide of the expedition
- Sharafidin – Kellicut's guide
- Sergei – Member of the doomed Russian expedition
