= Synodic act on the heretic of Armenia, the monk Martin =

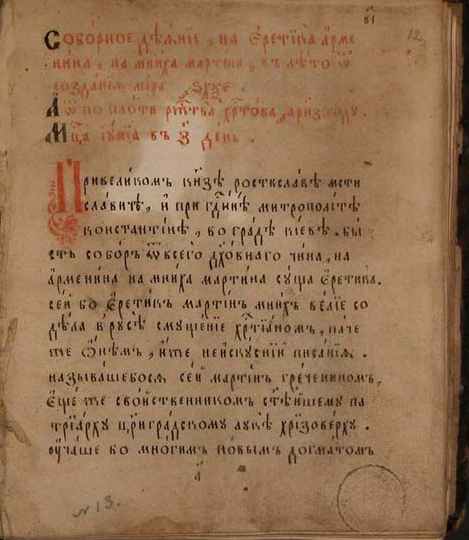
"The synodic act on the heretic of Amenia, the monk Martin, in the summer from the creation of the world 6665, and from the flesh of the Nativity of Christ 1157 of the month of Iunia on the 7th day." The pictured manuscript is from the second half of the 18th century, and is located in the library of the Trinity-Sergius Lavra. In the margin: "This act of the Council is translated from the Acts of the Council, which was written in Belorussian, and it was translated by His Eminence the Metropolitan of Rostov, Demetrius, in the very place that it was found in Kiev."

The Synodic Act on the heretic of Armenia, the monk Martin (Church Slavonic: Собо́рное дҍѧ́нїе на єретика́ армѧни́на, на мни́ха марти́на) is a forged document (act) created at the beginning of the 18th century by Dimitry of Rostov shortly before his death to be used against the Old Rite, and it was actively used by the missionaries of the Russian Orthodox Church during the Synodal Period in an attempt to convert the Old Believers. The main character of the Synodic Act is Martin Armenin or Martin the Armenian – a heretic and a monk. Martin Armenin was included as the name of a true person in many authoritative historical monographs and in liturgical texts by the Russian Orthodox Church.

Today, the Russian Orthodox Church recognizes that the work is a forgery, as stated in the Russian Orthodox Encyclopedia, the official encyclopedia of the Russian Orthodox Church.

== Background ==
In the mid-17th century, a series of reforms to the Russian Orthodox Church were made by Patriarch Nikon, with the goal of ensuring the future unity of the Orthodox Church. To this end, uniquely-Russian rituals were declared heretical, and those who continued using the rituals were proclaimed heretics and anathematized. (Some then-saints were also decanonized, such as Saint Anna of Kashin, who had been recently glorified).

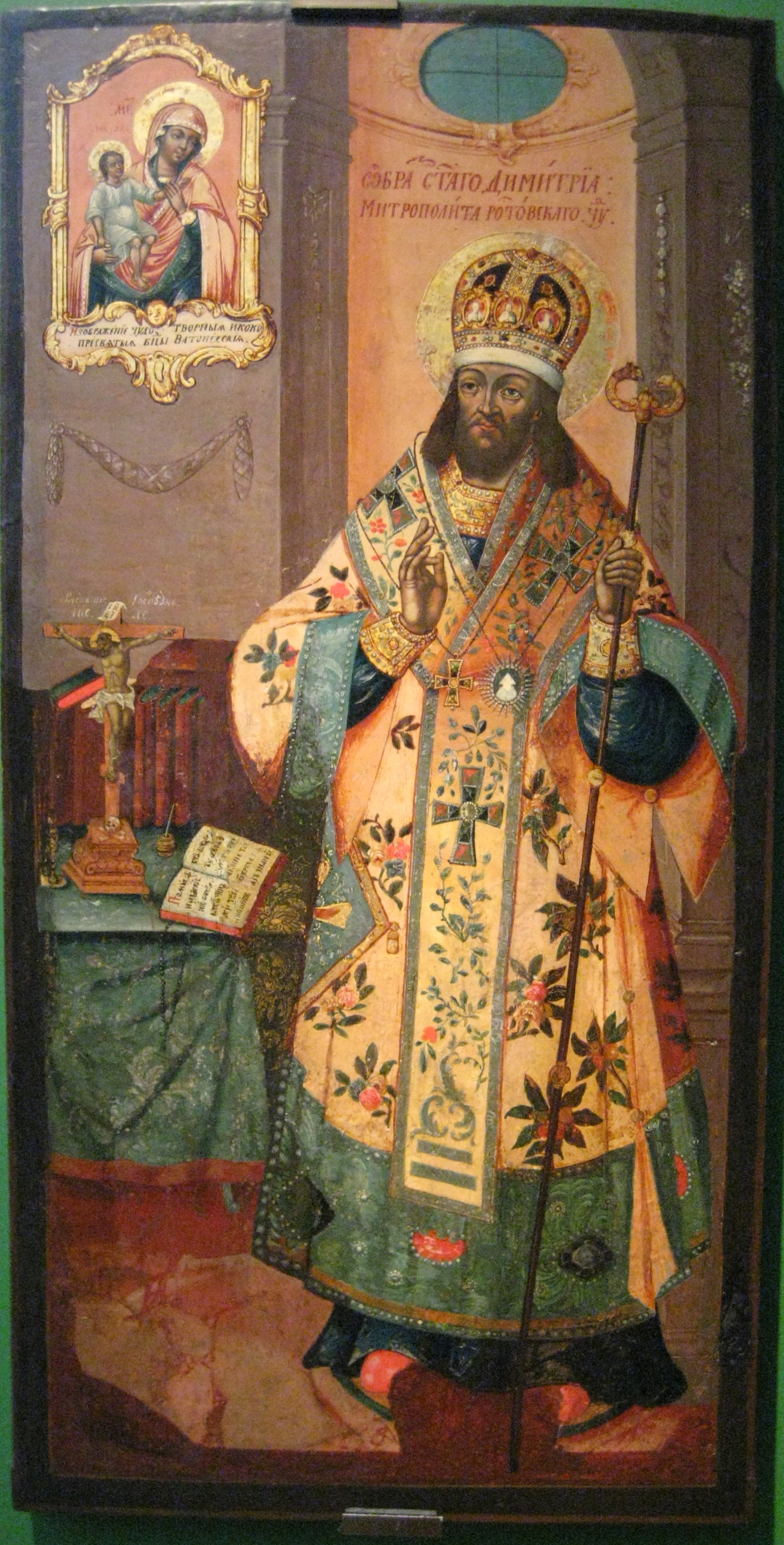
Dimitry of Rostov

Even before the start of the reform, Arseny (Sukhanov) had a debate with theologians of the Patriarchate of Antioch and the Patriarchate of Constantinople (ethnically Arab and Greek Christians, respectively, who followed the liturgical practices of the late Eastern Roman Empire) regarding how to fold the fingers during the sign of the cross. The theologians reproached Arseny by claiming that the Russians were baptized with the sign of the cross in the same way as the Armenians, to which Arseny accurately replied that the Armenians preserved the more ancient tradition (despite the belief at the time that Armenians were monophysites "heretics", though in fact they were miaphysites). Later, even though this debate had already occurred, the Patriarch of Antioch Macarius dismissed the work of Arseny and announced at the Moscow Local Council in 1656 that those who continued baptizing with the two-finger sign of the cross were "arrogant imitators" of the Armenians' supposed "heresy". Historians today, such as the Russian historian B.A. Uspensky, go even further than Arseny and suggest that the Armenians, like the Russians, had in fact adopted the two-finger sign of the cross from the Christians in the Eastern Roman Empire before the 14th century.

After the anathemas of the Synod of 1656 and the Great Moscow Synod, and the unsuccessful but brutal repressions of those who continued using the Old Rite, a new direction was chosen to fight the Old Rite: the doubling of the taxes of Old Believers and the use of forgeries. Following this decision, the future Russian Orthodox saint Dimitry of Rostov created the Synodic Act.

== Forgery ==
Less than a year before his death, during the reign of Peter the Great, Dimitry of Rostov create the forged work The Synodic Act on the Heretic of Armenia, the Martyr Martin. The document claims that a monk and heretic named Martin, an Armenian, arrived in Russia from Constantinople in 1149 and, pretending to be a Roman and a relative of the patriarch Luke Chrysoberges, began to preach in Russia various heresies. The heresies consisted of a combination of Armenian and Latin heresies (and according to the Acts, Martin learned the heresy in Rome itself). Subsequently, adopted by the Russians, the heresy consisted of making the sign of the cross with two fingers, saying the Jesus Prayer instead of the name of the Trinity while the sign of the cross was made, and using two alleluias instead of three alleluias. Especially for his heresy of making the sign of the cross with two fingers, he was condemned at the Council of Kiev in 1160, under the Grand Duke Rostislav Mstislavich and Metropolitan Constantine, both saints. Later, he was condemned at the Council of Constantinople during the following year, 1161, under Patriarch Luke Chrysoberges. Subsequently, Martin was burned.

== Authorship and publication ==
The first mention of the imaginary Council on the never-existing heretic Martin is found in the book "Mirror of the Orthodox Confession" (1709 year) from the Metropolitan Dimitry of Rostov, he writes: "To depict the same sign of the cross should be with three large fingers of the right hand, combined together. For so ordered by the Council, which was in Kiev about the monk Martin, and the holy patriarch of Antioch Makarius also teaches in reply to the interrogative message of the Patriarch of Russian Nikon". In addition, Pitirim began his missionary activity only in 1707. Pitirim in his book "Prashchitsa dukhovnaya" (translated: "Spiritual sling") says that he helped to find him "The synodic act of the heretic of Armenin, the monk Martin". Dimitry of Rostov gave Pitirim, the list of "The synodic act of the heretic of Armenin, the monk Martin", who was with him and which he wrote off from the ancient original document that was in Kiev

According to the official version, set forth by Archbishop Macarius Mirolyubov in the book "History of the Nizhny Novgorod Hierarchy", Pitirim at first had not the ancient document on hand but only a copy with it. That is a copy that Pitirim valued, written by Dimitry of Rostov in the beginning of the 18th century, did not convince the Old Believers during the dispute with Pitirim in 1711 in the existence of both the Council against Martin Armenin and the existence of Martin himself. The Old Believers suggested for Pitirim to find an authentic ancient document. In 1717, Pitirim addressed the occasion with a request to Patriarchal locum tenens Metropolitan Stefan Yavorsky and asked him to send the faithful monk to Kiev with the Tsar's decree for the sake of finding the original ancient document, Synodic Act, and for the Kyivan bishop to order to search in all book depositories without obstruction. Thanks to the petition, by the decree of Metropolitan Stephen in August 1717, the monk Theophylact of the Dormition Kerzhebel'mashskiy Monastery, administered by Pitirim, was sent to Kiev to find the true Synodic Act. On September 3, 1717, Theophylact arrived in Kiev. Here they began to search for the Synodic Act on the orders of Kyiv Metropolitan Ioasaph Krakovsky in all libraries. The search unsuccessful. The Synodic Act was found in the library of the ancient Пустынно-Николаевский монастырь and sent to Moscow along with nine other ancient books.

== Promotion by Russian Orthodox Church ==
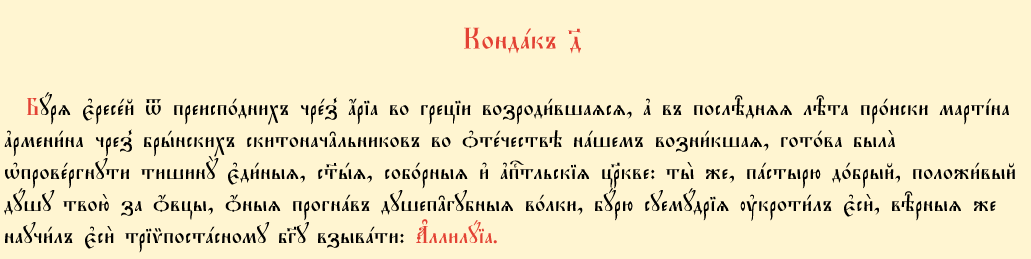
The section of St. Dimitry of Rostov's akathist which praises him for "discovering" the Synodic Act

A book with a story about the alleged heretic Martin was printed with the blessing of the Most Holy Synod repeatedly in 1721, 1726, 1752, and finally in 1913. In addition, Dimitry of Rostov was canonized, and in the late 18th century, an akathist included a section about Martin and was written by a priest of the Moscow Cathedral of Christ the Savior, John Alexeyev. The text was studied at three meetings of the Holy Synod in 1800 (July 2, July 13 and August 8). The synod then approved the text of the akathist and gave him the blessing to print it, which was done, and it is still the akathist used for him today.

A rough translation of the akathist to Dimitry of Rostov, the fourth kontakion:

The storm of heresies, from the underworld through Aria in Greece, was revived in the latter days by the machinations of Martin Armenin; and through the [Old Believers] in the Fatherland, still attempts to silence and destroy the One, Holy, Catholic and Apostolic Church. You, the good shepherd, for the love of your sheep, you drove away these soul-destroying wolves, you tamed the storm of insanity, and you taught the faithful to say to the Trinitarian God: Alleluia.

The Troparion in Tone VIII hints at his work against the Old Believers as well:

O lover of Orthodoxy and uprooter of schism, healer of Russia and new advocate before God, by thy writings thou didst heal the minds of the foolish. O blessed Demetrius, thou harp of the Spirit, entreat Christ God, that our souls may be saved.

In addition, the non-existent Martin and his condemnation by the also non-existent Kiev Synod were taught as though they were real in the higher spiritual educational institutions, including the theological academy where the priesthood and bishops were educated, throughout the Synodal Period. The character of Martin was mentioned as though he existed by a large number of religious authors during this time, including but not limited to: Saint Metropolitan Arsenius (Matseyevich), Metropolitan Simon of Moscow, Archbishop Nikephoros Theotokis, the Optina elder Saint Joseph of Optina, Archimandrite Jerome (Alyakrinsky), Saint Theophan the Recluse, Metropolitan Macarius (Bulgakov), and Saint Ignatius (Bryanchaninov).

A number of secular historians, such as Sergey Solovyov, also wrote about Martin Armenin as if he were a real historical person.

== Changing views ==
Old Believers argued that the Synodic Act and the heretic Martin were myths from the time of the document's publication by pointing out that it contains historical inconsistencies regarding the life of princes and metropolitans. However, the opinion of the Old Believers was not taken into account, as they were the ones about whom it supposedly contained damaging information. It was only later, during the 19th century, that Russian scholars started examining the Synodic Act critically. It turned out that in the 12th century, both in Russia and Byzantium, the sign of the cross was made with two fingers, and such a document would not have been made under any pretext at all. In addition, the very text of the "ancient" manuscript turned out to be a forgery of the 18th century.

Nikolai Mikhailovich Karamzin was the first of the 18th-century critics. He was skeptical about the exposition of Martin's story and the fragments of the "Act" as it was relayed in a document called the "Prayshchitsa" (access to the manuscript was still sealed at that time). In addition to pointing out various text anachronisms and signs that it had been written in a more recent period of the Russian language, he also pointed out the silence on the case of Martin in all available ancient sources. In 1854 permission was granted to researchers to examine the "ancient manuscript" in detail. After examining the document one of the researchers, Kapiton Ivanovich Nevostruev, called it a "compilation of falsehood".

Alexander Lvovich Sinai, Kapterev, Golubinsky, Gorsky and other researchers on the history of the Russian Orthodox Church have corroborated the conclusions of Karamzin and Nevostruev. Today, the Russian Orthodox Church recognizes that the work is a forgery. As stated by Patriarch Kirill in the Russian Orthodox Encyclopedia, "there is no doubt about the falsity of the Synodic Act".
