= Menocchio =

Italian miller and heretic (1532–1599)

Domenico Scandella (1532–1599), known as Menocchio (Italian pronunciation: [meˈnɔkkjo]), was an Italian miller from Montereale Valcellina, Republic of Venice, who was tried for heresy by the Roman Inquisition for his unorthodox religious views and then was burnt at the stake in 1599. The 16th-century life and medieval religious beliefs of Menocchio are known from the records of the Inquisition, and are the subject of The Cheese and the Worms (1976) by Carlo Ginzburg. They were dramatized in the stageplay Menocchio (2002) by Lillian Garrett-Groag and the film Menocchio (Menocchio the Heretic) (2018) by Alberto Fasulo.

== Biography ==
His parents were Zuane (Giovanni) and Menega (Domenica). He lived most of his life in Montereale, except for two years when he was banished from the town for brawling.

He had learned to read and read a number of contemporary works on religion and history. From these, he developed his religious views that departed substantially from Catholic orthodoxy of the time.

He was first tried for heresy in 1583, and abjured his statements in 1584, but spent another 20 months in prison in Concordia. Released in 1586, he claimed to have reformed. He remained under house arrest and had to wear a sign of a burning cross on his garments as a visible sign of his crimes. In 1598, he was arrested again as a lapsed heretic, having continued to propagate his beliefs. In 1599, he was declared a heresiarch and was executed by burning.

== Views ==
During his trial, he argued that the only sin was to harm one's neighbour and that to blaspheme caused no harm to anyone but the blasphemer. He further said that Jesus was born of man and Mary was not a virgin, that the pope had no power given to him from God but simply exemplified the qualities of a good man, and that Christ had not died to "redeem humanity".

Among the numerous accusations of blasphemy levelled against him, was a charge of contradicting the teachings of the Church on purgatory. Vicar Maro asked Menocchio if it were true he had said that Masses for the dead were useless. (According to Giuliano Stefanut, the words spoken by Menocchio had been precisely: "What are you doing giving alms in memory of these few ashes?"). Menocchio replied, "I meant, that we should be concerned about helping each other while we are still in this world because afterwards God is the one who governs over souls; the prayers and alms and Masses offered for the dead are done, as I understand it, for love of God, who then does as he pleases, because souls do not come to take those prayers and alms, and it belongs to the majesty of God to receive these good works either for the benefit of the living or the dead."

In additional criticisms of the Church, Menocchio declared that he rejected all the sacraments, including baptism, as human inventions, and mere "merchandise," instruments of exploitation and oppression in the hands of the clergy. He stated, "I believe that the law and commandments of the Church are all a matter of business, and they make their living from this." Regarding baptism, he stated, "I believe that as soon as we are born we are baptized, because God who has blessed all things, has baptized us; but this other baptism is an invention, and priests begin to consume souls even before they are born and continue to devour them even after their death."

Regarding confirmation, he stated, "I believe it is a business, an invention of men, all of whom have the Holy Spirit; they seek to know and they know nothing". Regarding marriage, he stated, "God did not establish it, men did. Formerly a man and a woman would exchange vows, and this sufficed; later these human inventions followed."

With a violent outburst against his judges, he proclaimed, "You priests and monks, you too want to know more than God, and you are like the devil, and you want to become gods on earth, and know as much as God, following in the footsteps of the devil. In fact, the more one thinks he knows, the less he knows."

Regarding the priesthood, he stated, "I believe the spirit of God dwells in all of us... and I also believe that anyone who has studied can become a priest without being ordained, because it is all a business."

Menocchio went on to say, "And it seems to me that under our law, the pope, cardinals, and bishops are so great and rich that everything belongs to the church and to the priests, and they oppress the poor, who, if they work two rented fields, these will be fields that belong to the Church, to some bishop or cardinal."

On 28 April, he began by denouncing the way the rich tyrannized the poor in the courts by using such an incomprehensible language as Latin (see Law Latin): "I think speaking Latin is a betrayal of the poor because in lawsuits the poor do not know what is being said and are crushed; and if they want to say four words they need a lawyer."

He further criticized the Church and Court proceedings by stating, "God has given the Holy Spirit to all, to Christians, to heretics, to Turks, and to Jews; and he considers them all dear, and they are all saved in the same manner."

== In other writing ==
In The Plato Papers (2000), Peter Ackroyd has Menocchio remembered by future historians as "that very interesting mythographer" who understood the four elements of earth, air, fire and water as once having been "congealed in a mass of putrefaction" and through which the "worms who burrowed through it were the angels, and that one of those angels became God". As these historians are writing in a period long past our own, with our contemporary civilisation rendered only through the ritual orations and fragmentary studies of the titular Plato, Menocchio's ideas are held to have been the foundation of "wormhole theory".

== Sources ==
- Capp, Bernard (2017). "Part IV Culture: Popular Culture(s)". In Kümin, Beat (ed.). The European World 1500–1800: An Introduction to Early Modern History. Taylor & Francis. ISBN 9781351394123.
- Ginzburg, Carlo (1980). The Cheese and the Worms: The Cosmos of a Sixteenth-Century Miller. Translated by Tedeschi, John. Baltimore: The Johns Hopkins University Press. ISBN 978-1421409887.
- Groag, Lillian (2002). "Menocchio". Berkeley Repertory Theatre. Archived from the original on 16 March 2015.
- Levine, David; Vahed, Zubedeh (2001). "Ginzburg's Menocchio: Refutations and Conjectures". Histoire sociale / Social History. 34 (68): 437–464.
- Monter, William (2001). "The Canonization of Domenico Scandella alias Menocchio". Bibliothèque d'Humanisme et Renaissance. 63 (3): 621–623.
- Zambelli, P. (1979). "UNO, DUE, TRE, MILLE MENOCCHIO'-SPONTANEOUS GENERATION (OR THE PERSONAL COSMOGONY OF A 16TH-CENTURY MILLER)". Archivio Storico Italiano. 137 (499): 51–90.
