= Robert Darnton =

American historian (born 1939)

- Darnton in 2025
- Born: May 10, 1939 (age 87); New York City, New York, U.S.
- Education: Harvard University (AB); University of Oxford (DPhil)
- Occupations: Historian, librarian
- Parent: Byron Darnton (father)
- Relatives: John Darnton (brother)
- Writing career
- Subjects: Cultural history, 18th-century France, history of the book
- Notable work: The Great Cat Massacre

Robert Choate Darnton (born May 10, 1939) is an American cultural historian and academic librarian who specializes in 18th-century France.

He was director of the Harvard University Library from 2007 to 2016.

== Life ==
Darnton was born in New York City. He graduated from Phillips Academy in 1957 and Harvard University in 1960, attended Oxford University on a Rhodes scholarship, and earned a PhD (DPhil) in history from Oxford in 1964, where he studied with Richard Cobb, among others. The title of his thesis was Trends in radical propaganda on the eve of the French Revolution (1782–1788). He worked as reporter at The New York Times from 1964 to 1965. He was a Junior Fellow in the Harvard Society of Fellows from 1965 to 1968. Joining the Princeton University faculty in 1968, he was appointed Shelby Cullom Davis Professor of European History and was awarded a MacArthur Fellowship in 1982. He was president of the International Society for Eighteenth-Century Studies from 1987 to 1991, where he founded the East-West Seminar, now continued as the International Seminar for Early Career Scholars. He served as president of the American Historical Association in 1999, where he founded the Gutenberg-e Program, sponsored by the Mellon Foundation.

Darnton was a trustee of the Oxford University Press from 1994 to 2007. He is a trustee of the New York Public Library, where he designed and helped launch the Dorothy and Lewis B. Cullman Center for Scholars and Writers.

On July 1, 2007, he transferred to emeritus status at Princeton, and was appointed Carl H. Pforzheimer University Professor and director of the Harvard University Library, succeeding Sidney Verba. As University Librarian, he co-founded the Digital Public Library of America and he designed the digital archive Colonial North America: Worlds of Change. In January 2016, Ann Blair succeeded him as the Carl H. Pforzheimer University Professor.

Darnton is a pioneer in the field of the history of the book, and has written about electronic publishing.

== Awards and honors ==
His first major prize was the Leo Gershoy Award for The Business of Enlightenment in 1979. He was later elected to the American Academy of Arts and Sciences in 1980 and the American Philosophical Society in 1989. He has also received the National Book Critics Circle Award for criticism for The Forbidden Best-Sellers of Pre-Revolutionary France (New York: W.W. Norton, 1996).

In 1996-1997 he held the Lyell Readership in Bibliography.

In 1999, he was named a Chevalier of the Légion d'Honneur, an award given by the French government, in recognition of his work. In 2004 he was awarded the Gutenberg Prize of the International Gutenberg Society and the City of Mainz by the International Gutenberg Society.

In 2005, he received an award for distinguished achievement from the American Printing History Association.

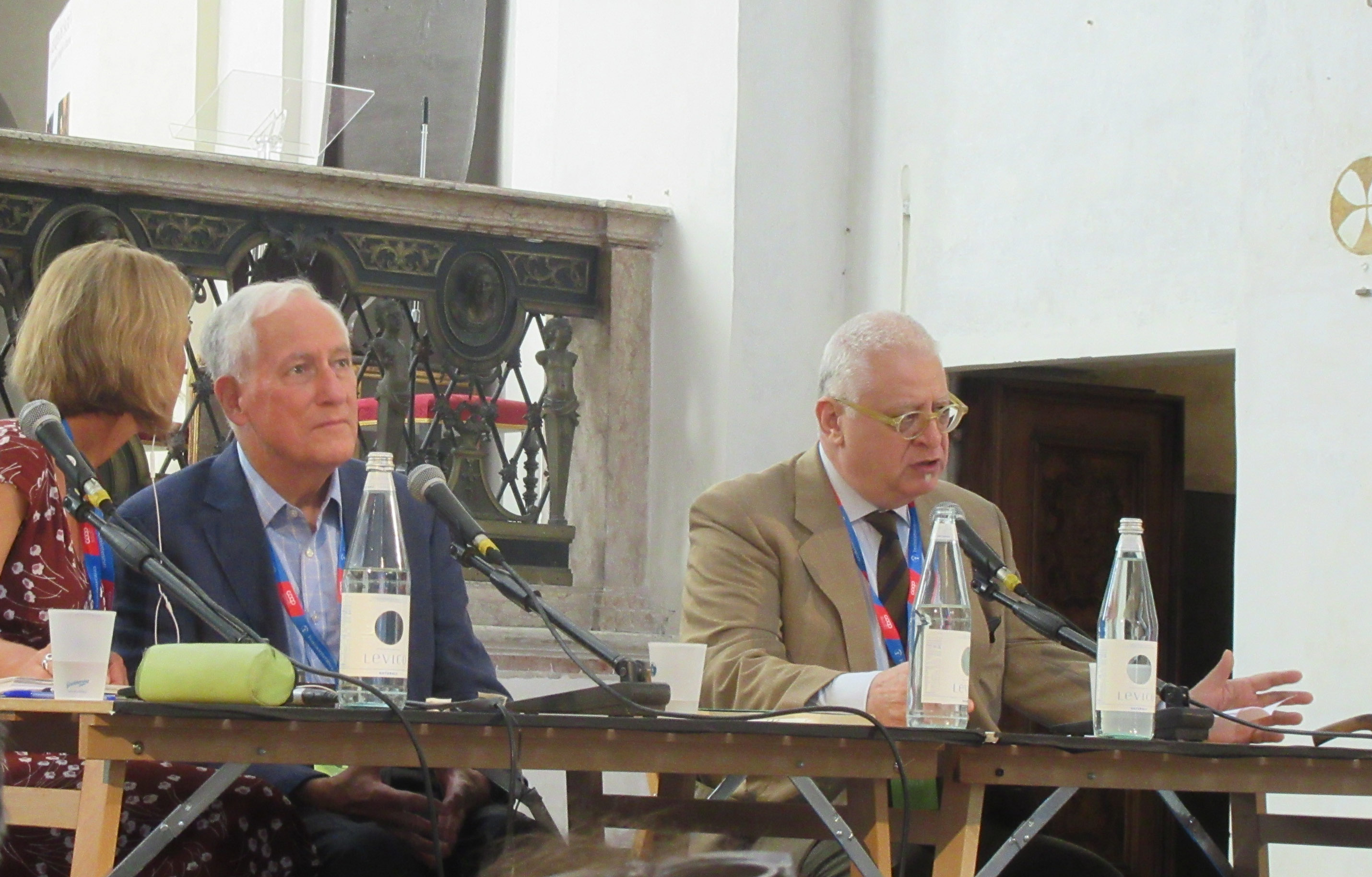
Prof. Darnton with prof. Hans Tuzzi at Festivaletteratura of Mantua, September 8, 2018.

On February 13, 2012, he was awarded the National Humanities Medal 2011 by President Barack Obama, for his determination to make knowledge accessible to everyone.

In 2013, he was awarded the Prix mondial Cino Del Duca lifetime achievement award by the Institut de France.

== Family ==
His brother is the retired New York Times editor and author John Darnton, and his father was the war correspondent Byron Darnton.

== Works ==
External videos
- George Washington’s False Teeth, August 31, 2003, C-SPAN
- Presentation by Darnton on The Case for Books, February 3, 2010, C-SPAN

- Mesmerism and the End of the Enlightenment in France. Cambridge, MA: Harvard University Press. 1995 [1968]. ISBN 978-0-674-56950-8.
- The Business of Enlightenment: A Publishing History of the Encyclopédie, 1775–1800. Cambridge, MA: Harvard Univ. Press. 1987 [1979]. ISBN 978-0-674-08786-6.
- The Literary Underground of the Old Regime. Cambridge, MA: Harvard University Press. 1982. ISBN 978-0-674-53656-2.
- The Great Cat Massacre and Other Episodes in French Cultural History. New York: Basic Books. 1984. ISBN 978-0-465-02700-2.
- Coauthored with Daniel Roche: Revolution in Print: the Press in France 1775–1800. Berkeley, CA: University of California Press. 1989. ISBN 978-0-520-06430-0.
- The Kiss of Lamourette: Reflections in Cultural History. New York, NY: W. W. Norton. 1990. ISBN 978-0-393-02753-2.
- Edition et sédition. L'univers de la littérature clandestine au XVIIIe siècle (in French). Paris: Gallimard. 1991. ISBN 978-2-07-072212-9.
- Berlin Journal, 1989–1990. New York, NY: W. W. Norton. 1993 [1991]. ISBN 978-0-393-31018-4.
- Gens de lettres, gens du livre (in French). Paris: O. Jacob. 1992. ISBN 978-2-7381-0162-4.
- The Forbidden Best-Sellers of Pre-Revolutionary France. New York: Norton. 1996. ISBN 978-0-393-31442-7.
- The Corpus of Clandestine Literature in France, 1769–1789. New York, NY: W. W. Norton. 1995. ISBN 978-0-393-03745-6.
- George Washington's False Teeth: An Unconventional Guide to the Eighteenth Century. New York, NY: W. W. Norton. 2003. ISBN 978-0-393-05760-7.
- The Case for Books: Past, Present, and Future. New York: NY Public Affairs. 2009. ISBN 978-1-58648-826-0.
- The Devil in the Holy Water, or the Art of Slander from Louis XIV to Napoleon. Philadelphia, PA: Univ. of Pennsylvania Press. 2009. ISBN 978-0-8122-4183-9.
- Poetry and the Police: Communication Networks in Eighteenth-Century Paris. Cambridge, MA: Belknap Press. 2010. ISBN 978-0-674-05715-9.
- Censors at Work: How States Shaped Literature. New York, NY: W. W. Norton. 2014. ISBN 978-0-393-24229-4.
- A Literary Tour de France: The World of Books on the Eve of the French Revolution. Oxford University Press. 2018. ISBN 978-0-19-514451-2. (author website)
- Pirating and Publishing: The Book Trade in the Age of Enlightenment. Oxford University Press. 2021. ISBN 978-0-19-514452-9.
- The Revolutionary Temper: Paris, 1748–1789. W. W. Norton. 2023. ISBN 978-1-32-403558-9.
- The Writer's Lot: Culture and Revolution in Eighteenth Century France. Cambridge, MA: Belknap Press. 2025. ISBN 978-0-674-29988-7.
