= Hilda Ellis Davidson =

English folklorist (1914–2006)

- Born: 1 October 1914; Bebington, Cheshire, England
- Died: 12 January 2006 (aged 91); Dartford, Kent, England
- Spouse: Richard Robertson Davidson (after 1943)
- Children: 2
- Awards: Katharine Briggs Folklore Award (1988)

Academic background
- Education: Newnham College, Cambridge (MA, PhD)
- Thesis: Eschatology and Manticism in Old Norse Literature (1940)
- Academic advisors: Hector Munro Chadwick; Nora K. Chadwick

Academic work
- Discipline: Folklore studies
- Institutions: The Folklore Society; Lucy Cavendish College, Cambridge
- Notable students: Jacqueline Simpson
- Main interests: Ancient Celtic religion; Anglo-Saxons, Anglo-Saxon religion and Old English literature; British folklore; Germanic paganism, mythology, folklore and culture; Old Norse religion, mythology and literature; Scandinavian folklore; Viking Age
- Notable works: Gods and Myths of Northern Europe (1964); Myths and Symbols in Pagan Europe (1988)

Hilda Roderick Ellis Davidson FSA (born Hilda Roderick Ellis; 1 October 1914 – 12 January 2006) was an English folklorist. She was a scholar at the University of Cambridge and The Folklore Society, and specialized in the study of Celtic and Germanic religion and folklore.

A graduate of Newnham College, Cambridge, Davidson was a Fellow at Lucy Cavendish College, Cambridge, throughout much of her career. She specialized in the interdisciplinary study of Celtic, Anglo-Saxon and Old Norse religion and folklore, on which she was the author of numerous influential works. Davidson was a prominent member of The Folklore Society, and played an active role in the growth of folklore studies as a scientific discipline. Throughout her career, Davidson tutored a significant number of aspiring scholars in her fields of study, and was particularly interested in encouraging gifted women to pursue scholarly careers.

== Early life and education ==
Hilda Ellis Davidson was born in Bebington, Cheshire, England, on 1 October 1914, the daughter of Henry Roderick (a stationer) and Millie Cheesman Ellis.

Davidson received a First Class Honours degree in English, archaeology and anthropology from Newnham College, Cambridge. She gained both her M.A. (1939) and PhD (1940) at Newnham. Her PhD thesis was on Old Norse religion. Davidson would eventually become proficient in many languages, including Old Norse, Norwegian, Swedish, Danish, Icelandic, Russian, Latin and German.

== Early career ==
Davidson began her academic career as an assistant lecturer in English at Royal Holloway, University of London (1939–1944). Her first book The Road to Hel: A Study of the Conception of the Dead in Old Norse Literature (1943), published under her maiden name Hilda Ellis, utilized archaeological evidence for the examination of death in Norse paganism. This was a pioneering approach, as the study of Old English and Old Norse in British academia at the time was strictly concerned with literary and linguistic concerns. Davidson's utilization of an interdisciplinary approach to the study of Old Norse religion was to become a strong characteristic of her research. From 1945 to 1955 she was a lecturer in the extramural department at Birkbeck, University of London.

Although encountering a significant amount of opposition to her attempt at combining archaeological and philological evidence for the study of Old Norse and wider Germanic religion, Davidson continued with her research. In subsequent years, she published a number of influential works, including The Sword in Anglo-Saxon England (1962), Gods and Myths of Northern Europe (1964), Pagan Scandinavia (1967), and Scandinavian Mythology (1969). With Peter Gelling, she published The Chariot of the Sun (1969). During this time, Davidson contributed many papers to scholarly journals, where she often drew on her knowledge of myth, legend and folklore to interpret archaeological finds. She received a research award from the Leverhulme Trust in 1964 for her work in the Soviet Union.

== Return to Cambridge ==
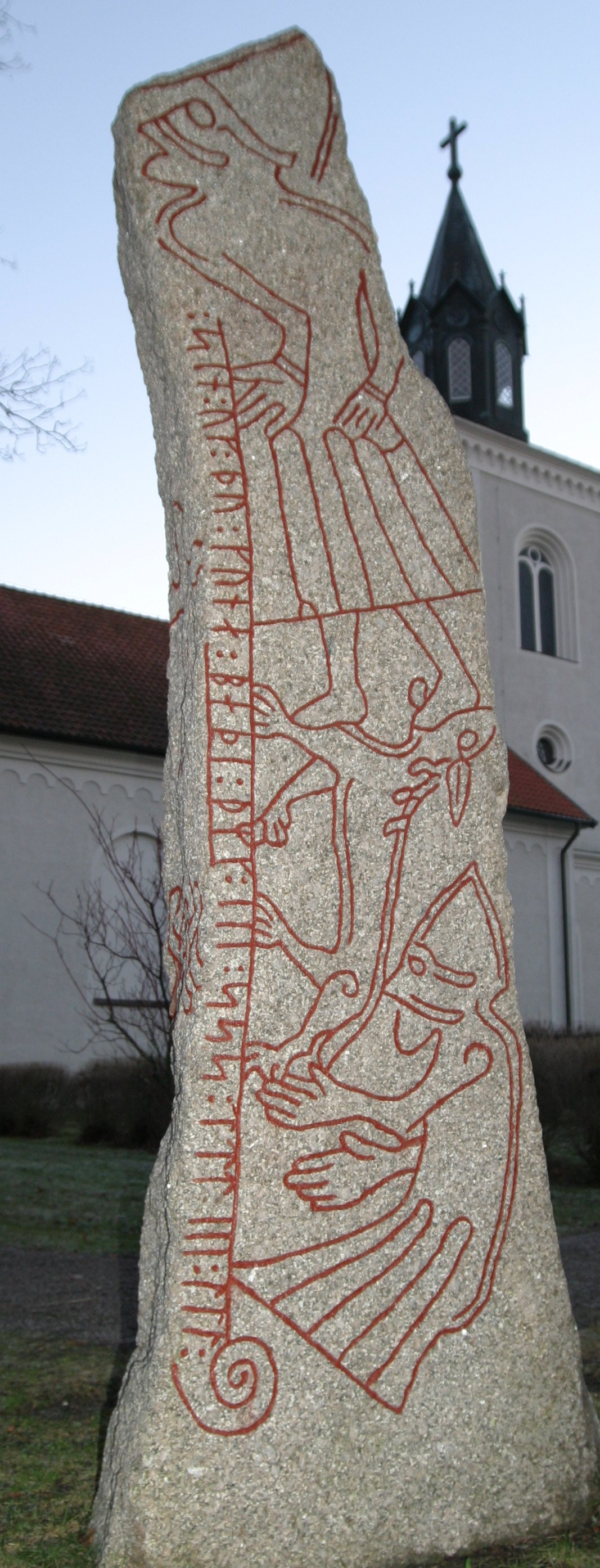
The Ledberg stone depicts an event from Norse mythology. Davidson was well known for her usage of such archaeological evidence for the study of Old Norse religion.

From 1968 to 1971, Davidson was a Calouste Gulbenkian Research Fellow at Lucy Cavendish College, Cambridge. After 1971 she was Lecturer, and after 1974 Fellow, in Anglo-Saxon, Norse and Celtic at Lucy Cavendish. She was vice president at Lucy Cavendish from 1975 to 1980. She was deeply involved in the expansion and modernization of Lucy Cavendish. During this time she also published several influential works, including The Viking Road to Byzantium (1976) and The History of the Danes: Saxo Grammaticus (1979–1980). At Cambridge Davidson ran the Cambridge Folklore Group, and was known as an active and lively speaker.

== Work for The Folklore Society ==
Davidson had joined The Folklore Society in 1949, and was a member of its council (later Committee) from 1956 to 1986, subsequently becoming an honorary member. As a leading member of the Society, she played an active role in restoring the field of folklore studies as a scientific discipline. Davidson was actively involved in encouraging the modernization and democratization of the Society. Notable friends whom she worked with in this regard include Katharine Briggs and Stewart Sanderson. These efforts culminated in the election of Katharine Briggs as president and Venetia Newall as Secretary of the Society in 1967. In the subsequent years, Davidson was publications officer of the society, supervised the newly formed Mistletoe Books series, organized conferences, and edited or co-edited the papers that were produced as a result.

Davidson was herself President of the Society from 1974 to 1976, during which the Society prospered. Its constitution was rewritten, and the output of its journal, Folklore, significantly expanded in both volume and quality. Davidson's efforts to modernize the Society are memorized in her Changes in the Folklore Society, 1949–1986 (1987), which were published originally in Folklore. Apart from her membership in The Folklore Society, Davidson was also a Fellow of the Society of Antiquaries of London.

== Later career ==
In her later career, Davidson was particularly interested in exploring themes and beliefs common in both early Celtic and Germanic culture. Books produced as a result include Myths and Symbols in Pagan Europe (1988), Lost Beliefs of Northern Europe (1993), and Roles of the Northern Goddesses (1998). She received the Coote Lake Medal for Folklore Research in 1984. Davidson helped endow the Katharine Briggs Folklore Award in 1982, which she herself received in 1988 for her Myths and Symbols in Pagan Europe (1988).

Davidson also dedicated herself to examining the history of folklore studies itself. In this connection, together with Carmen Blacker, she edited Women and Tradition: A Neglected Group of Folklorists (2000). In 1987, Davidson helped found the Katharine Briggs Dining Club. She organized many of its conferences, and edited the papers that were produced as a result, often in cooperation with Blacker and Anna Chaudhri. In 1988 she published a biography of her friend Katharine Briggs. The last of her editorial projects, A Companion to the Fairy Tale (2003), was conducted in cooperation with Chaudhri.

== Personal life ==
On 27 December 1943, Davidson married Richard Robertson Davidson, a research scientist, with whom she had two children. Davidson was a member of the Liberal Party and the Church of England. She was actively involved in church life as a churchwarden and bell-ringer.

== Death and legacy ==
Davidson died on 12 January 2006. Her funeral was held in St Bene't's Church in Cambridge on 21 January 2006. She was survived by her children, grandchildren and great-grandchildren.

At the time of her death, Davidson had for many decades been a highly distinguished scholar in Old Norse religion and mythology. She helped extend both popular and scholarly interest in the fields of Norse, Germanic and Celtic mythology. She played an important role in the post-war revival of folklore studies, and in establishing the study of British folklore as a scientific discipline. Several of her works were translated into multiple languages, including Swedish, Norwegian, Danish, Dutch and Japanese. Her effort to encourage interdisciplinary research combining archaeology, literature, folklore and history was highly important. She was a tutor of a large number of scholars in mythology and folklore, and was particularly devoted to encouraging the scholarly careers of gifted women.

== Selected works ==
- (1940) Eschatology and Manticism in Old Norse Literature. (Doctoral dissertation). University of Cambridge.
- (1941) "Fostering by Giants in Old Norse Sagas", Med. Aev. 10: 70–85.
- (1942) "Sigurd in the Art of the Viking Age", Antiquity 16: 216–36.
- (1943) The Road to Hel: A Study of the Conception of the Dead in Old Norse Literature, Cambridge University Press, "originally part of a thesis accepted in 1940 for the degree of PhD in the University of Cambridge."
- (1950) "The Hill of the Dragon" (Anglo-Saxon Burial Mounds), Folklore 61.
- (1950) "Gods and Heroes in Stone" In C. Fox and B. Dickens (eds.), The Early Cultures of North-West Europe (H.M. Chadwick Memorial Studies), 123–9, London.
- (1958) The Golden Age of Northumbria, Longmans, [a volume in the "Then and There Series"].
- (1958) "Weland the Smith," Folklore 69: 145–59.
- (1960) "The Sword at the Wedding" Folklore 71, 1–18.
- (1962) The Sword in Anglo-Saxon England, Boydell Press, Woodbridge.
- (1963) "Folklore and Man's Past", Folklore, 74: 527–44, London.
- (1964) Book Review: Myth and Religion of the North by E. O. G. Turville-Petre. London: Weidenfeld Nicolson (History of Religion), 1964. Antiquity 38: 309–310.
- (1964) Gods and Myths of Northern Europe, Penguin Books Ltd, Harmondsworth. (later re-published as Gods and Myths of the Viking Age, Bell Publishing Company, 1980).
- (1965) "The Finglesham Man", Sonia Chadwick Hawkes, H.R.E Davidson and C. Hawkes, Antiquity, 39: 17–32.
- (1965) "Thor's Hammer", Folklore 76: 1–15.
- (1965) "The Significance of the Man in the Horned Helmet", Antiquity 39: 23–7.
- (1967) Pagan Scandinavia, (Ancient Peoples and Places 58) London.
- (1967) "The Anglo-Saxon Burial at Coombe [Woodnesborough], Kent", Medieval Archeology 11: 1–41 (by H.E. Davidson and L. Webster).
- (1969) Scandinavian Mythology, Paul Hamlyn, London.
- (1969) The Chariot of the Sun and Other Rites and Symbols of the Northern Bronze Age, by Peter Gelling and H.E. Davidson, Frederick A. Praeger Publishers, New York.
- (1969) "The Smith and the Goddess", Frühmittelalterliche Studiern (University of Münster) 3: 216–26.
- (1971) Beowulf and its Analogues, by George Norman Garmonsway, Hilda Roderick Ellis Davidson, and Jacqueline Simpson; E. P. Dutton.
- (1972) "The Battle God of the Vikings", (G.N. Garmonsway Memorial Lecture), University of York, Medieval Monographs I, York.
- (1973) "Hostile Magic in the Icelandic Sagas", The Witch Figure, ed. V. Newall (London) 20–41.
- (1974) "Folklore and History", Folklore 85.
- (1975) "Scandinavian Cosmology" in C. Blacker and M. Loewe's Ancient Cosmologies, 172–97, London.
- (1975) "Folklore and Literature", Folklore 86.
- (1976) The Viking Road to Byzantium, Allen and Unwin, London.
- (1978) Patterns of Folklore, D.S. Brewer Ltd, Ipswich. [Appears to reprint earlier articles such as "Thor's Hammer" and "The Sword at the Wedding" also includes an essay on "Lady Godiva"].
- (1978) "Shape-changing in the Old Norse Sagas" in J.R. Porter's and W.H.S. Russell's Animals in Folklore, 126-42 Folklore Society, Ipswich.
- (1978) "Mithras and Wodan", Études Mithraïques 4: 99–110, Acta Iranica, Leiden.
- (1979) "Loki and Saxo's Hamlet", The Fool and the Trickster; Studies in Honor of Enid Welsford, ed. P.V.A. Williams (Cambridge) 3–17.
- (1979–80) Saxo Grammaticus, The History of the Danes, Books I-IX [Peter Fisher Translation]: Edited with Commentary by H.E. Davidson, Woodbridge: Boydell.
- (Date unknown, pre-1980) Author of the article "Hero" in Encyclopædia Britannica.
- (1980) "Wit and Eloquence in the Courts of Saxo's Early Kings", "To be published as part of the Saxo Symposium, University of Copenhagen 1979."
- (1980) "Insults and Riddles in the Edda Poems", Published in Edda, A Collection of Essays, 25–46, University of Manitoba Icelandic Series 4, 1983.
- (1981) "The Restless Dead: An Icelandic Story", in H.E. Davidson and W.M.S. Russell's (eds.) The Folklore of Ghosts, Mistletoe Series 15, London Folklore Society.
- (1981) "The Germanic World" in M. Loewe and C. Blacker's Divination and Oracles,115-41, London.
- (1984) "The Hero in Tradition and Folklore: Papers Read at a Conference of the Folklore Society Held at Dyffryn House, Cardiff, July 1982" (World Bibliographical Series), Folklore Society Library.
- (1984) "The Hero as a Fool: The Northern Hamlet", The Hero in Tradition and Folklore, (ed. H.R.E. Davidson) 30–4, (Mistletoe Books, 19, Folklore Soc.) London,
- (1988) Myths and Symbols in Pagan Europe: early Scandinavian and Celtic religions, Manchester University Press, Manchester.
- (1989) The Seer in Celtic and Other Traditions, ed. by Hilda Ellis Davidson, John Donald Publishers, Ltd., Edinburgh, 1989.
- (1989) "Hooded men in Celtic and Germanic Tradition" in G. Davies, Polytheistic Systems, Cosmos 5, 105–124.
- (1989) "The Training of Warriors" in S. C. Hawkes, Weapons and Warfare in Anglo-Saxon England.
- (1990) "Religious Practices of the Northern Peoples in Scandinavian Tradition", Temonos 26:23–24
- (1992) "Human Sacrifice in the Late Pagan Period of North-Western Europe" in M.O.H. Carver's The Age of Sutton Hoo: The Seventh Century in North-Western Europe, 331–40, Woodbridge.
- (1992) "Royal Graves as Religious Symbols" in W. Filmer-Sankey's Anglo-Saxon Studies in Archeology and History 5, 23–31, Oxford.
- (1993) Boundaries and Thresholds: papers from a colloquium of the Katharine Briggs Club (editor).
- (1993) The Lost Beliefs of Northern Europe, Routledge, London.
- (1993) "The Hair and the Dog", Folklore 104: 151–63 by H. E. Davidson and A. Chaudhri.
- (1993) The Seer in Celtic and other traditions
- (1996) Katharine Briggs: Story-teller, Lutterworth Press.
- (1996) "Milk and the Northern Goddess" in S. Billington's and M. Green's The Concept of the Goddess, Routledge, New York. [This work is a tribute to Davidson].
- (1998) Roles of the Northern Goddess, Routledge, London.
- (2001) "The Wild Hunt" in Supernatural Enemies, Edited by H.E. Davidson and Anna Chaudhri. Carolina Academic Press, Durham, N.C.
- (2001) Women and Tradition, Hilda Ellis Davidson and Carmen Blacker, Carolina Academic Press, Durham, N.C.
- (2003) A Companion to the Fairy Tale, Hilda Ellis Davidson and Anna Chaudhri, Boydell & Brewer Ltd.
