= James Grayson =

James Grayson may refer to:

== People ==
- James Grayson (music industry executive) (1897–1980), English music industry executive
- James Grayson (rugby union player) (born 1998), English professional rugby union player
- James H. Grayson (born 1944), American scholar of religions and folklore of Korea
- James Grayson (fl. 2010s–2020s), bass player in the band Trash Boat
- James Grayson (fl. 1860s), a Tennessee politician referenced in the song "Tom Dooley"

== Fictional characters ==
- James Grayson, two characters in the 1916 film The Race
- James Grayson, a character in the 1935 film The Pecos Kid
- James Grayson, a character in the video game series Resistance
