= Wake (ceremony) =

Death-related gathering

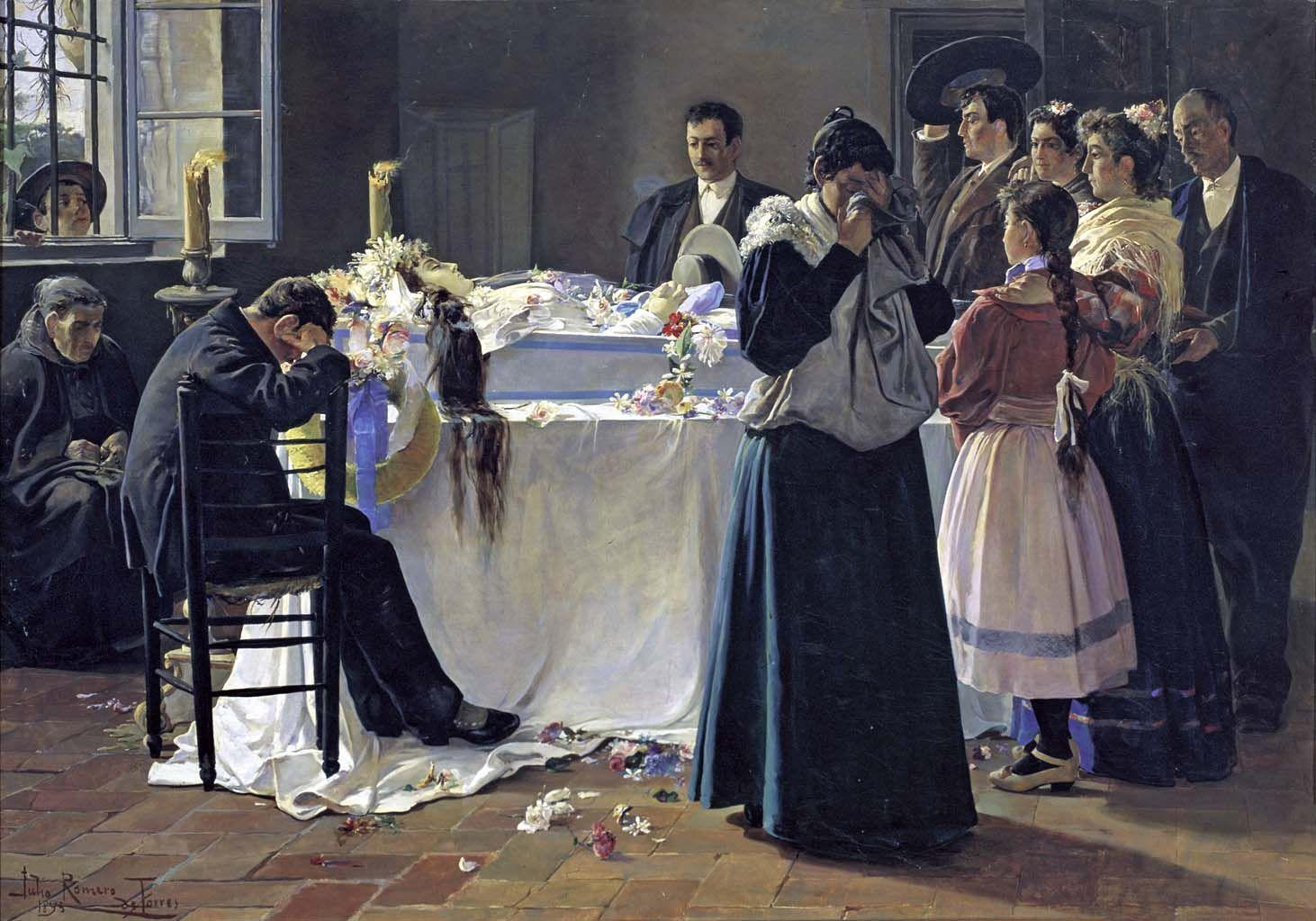
Mira qué bonita era ('Look How Lovely She Was') by Julio Romero de Torres, 1895

A wake or visitation is a social gathering associated with death, held before a funeral. Traditionally, a wake involves family and friends keeping watch over the body of the dead person, usually in the home of the deceased. Some wakes are held at a funeral home or another convenient location. The wake or the viewing of the body is a part of death rituals in many cultures. It allows one last interaction with the dead, providing a time for the living to express their thoughts and feelings with the deceased. It highlights the idea that the loss is borne by the whole community and is a way of honoring the deceased member. The emotional tone of a wake is sometimes seen as more positive than a funeral due to the socially supportive atmosphere and the focus on the life rather than the death of the deceased.

In many cultures a reception is held to celebrate the life of the deceased after the funeral rather than before it.

== Origin ==
The term originally referred to a late-night prayer vigil but is now mostly used for the social interactions accompanying a funeral. While the modern sense of the verb wake is "to cease sleeping", it earlier meant "to remain awake, to keep watch". It is a misconception that people at a wake are waiting in case the deceased should "wake up".

The term wake was originally used to denote a prayer vigil, often an annual event held on the feast day of the saint to whom a parish church was dedicated. Over time the association with prayer has become less important, although not lost completely, and in many countries a wake is now mostly associated with the social interactions accompanying a funeral.

== Ireland ==
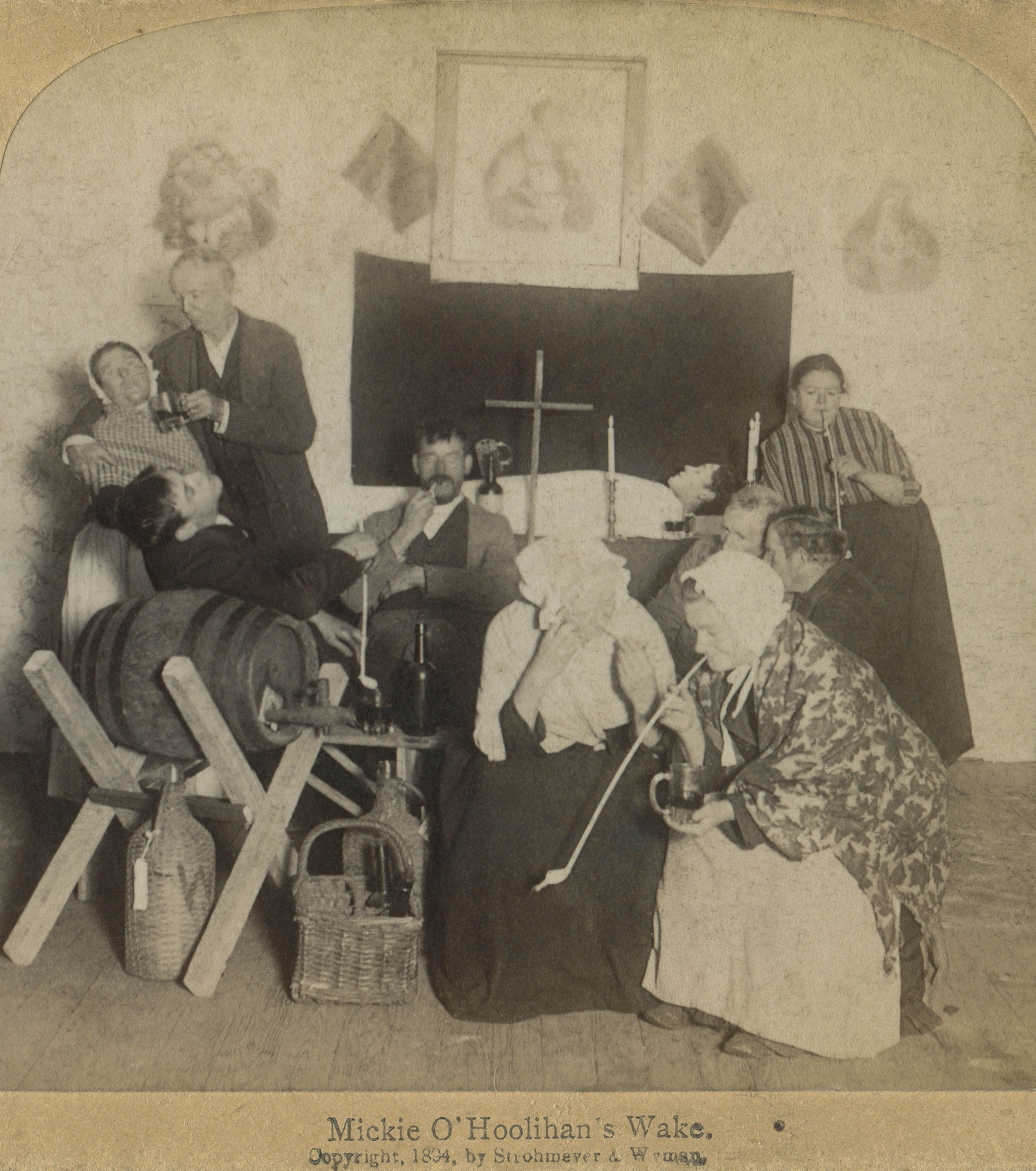
An Irish wake as depicted in the later 19th century

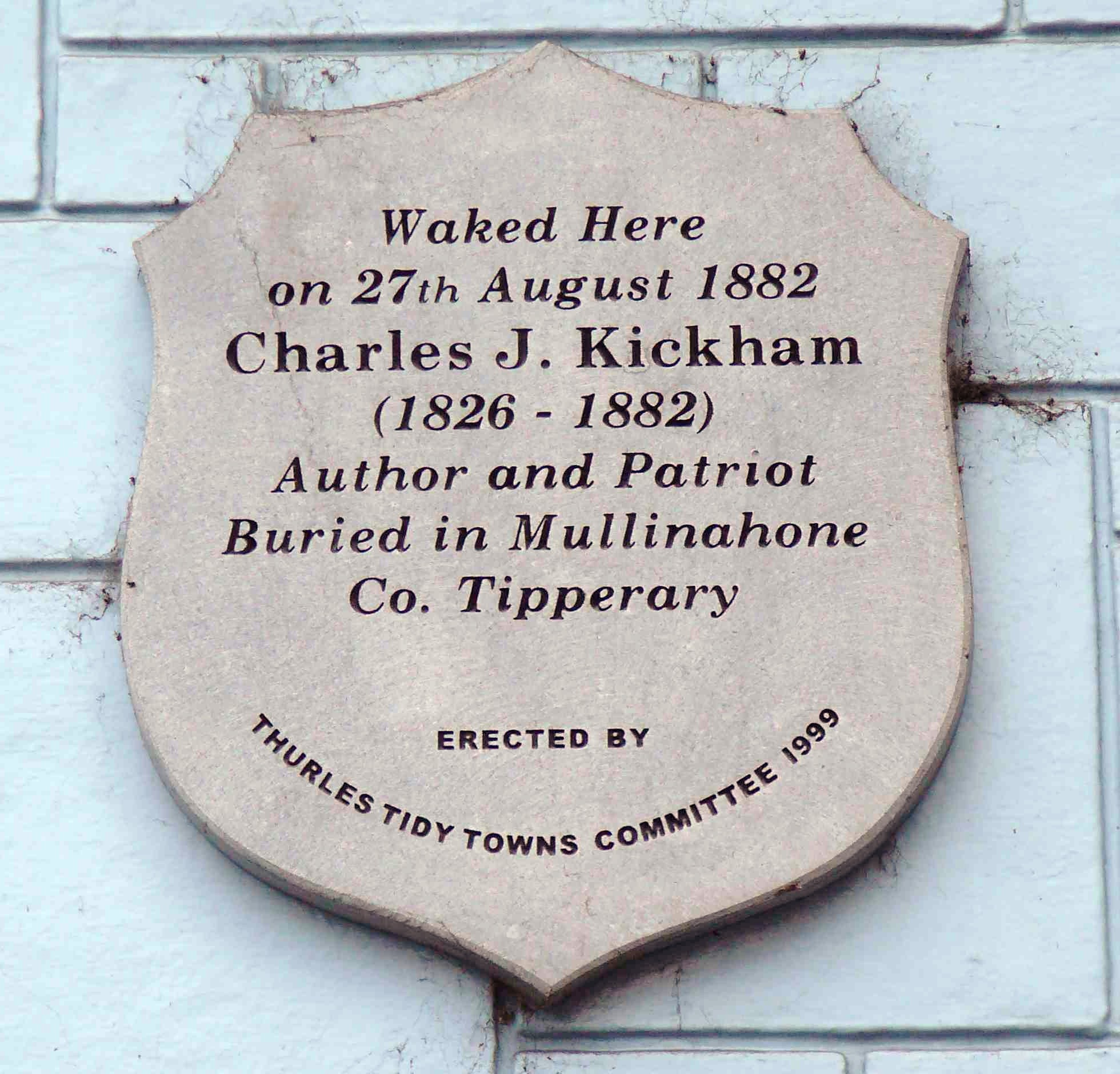
Plaque in Thurles marking the site of the wake of the writer Charles Kickham.

The wake (Irish: tórramh, faire) is a key part of the death customs of Ireland; it is an important phase in the separation of the dead from the world of the living and transition to the world of the dead. Typically lasting one or two days, it is a continuous watch kept over the dead by family and friends, usually in their own home, before burial. Shane McCorristine writes that the original purposes of an Irish wake were to honour the dead, to celebrate their life, to ensure that death had really occurred, to guard the body from evil, and to placate their soul.

Shortly after death, the body is usually prepared and placed in a coffin at a funeral home, then brought to the dead person's home for the wake, which is now referred to as the 'wake house'. Historically, the body was usually washed, groomed and clothed in a white shroud at their own home by local wise women. Traditionally, windows of a wake house are left open to let the soul leave the room, mirrors are covered or turned around, clocks are stopped, and household pets are kept out for the duration of the wake. It is also customary for candles to be kept lit.

Relatives and friends are expected to visit to pay respects to the dead and to their family, who in turn provide hospitality. At intervals, a collective prayer might be said; for Catholics usually the Rosary. Traditionally there is food and drink, as well as storytelling, music, singing and dancing. Historically, wakes were important social gatherings for the young, who sometimes partook in rowdier amusements and courtship. Patricia Lysaght says the traditional revelry at wakes can be seen as a way of reasserting the life of the community in the face of death. However, when a death is particularly tragic, or that of a child, the wake is more private and mournful.

Historically, keening was performed at the wake by a group of women who sat around the body. It was a poetic lament for the dead, addressed directly to the dead person. A leading keening woman (bean chaointe) chanted verses and led a choral death wail, in which the other keeners joined while swaying rhythmically. Sometimes professional keeners were hired to fulfill this obligation to the dead. Lysaght writes, "This communal lamentation is often described as having a cathartic effect on family and community members present".

At the end of the wake, the coffin is carried out of the wake house by male family and friends. Up into the 19th century, mourners would follow the body to the burial ground, continuing the death wail during transit and until burial was complete. The death wail, keening, and the rowdier 'wake games' gradually died out in the late 19th century, due to condemnation from church authorities.

== Wales ==
Historically, there was a custom in Wales to store the coffin in the home until the funeral. Friends and neighbours would volunteer for the ritual of gwylio'r corff ('watching the body'). The wake, known as gwylnos was held the night preceding the funeral and was a time of merriment.

== Other modern wakes ==
Wake customs similar to those of Ireland are still found in North-western Scotland and in Northern England.

Noting the crowd, the emotion, and alcohol, Tom Watson, writing in Forbes, said of The Concert for New York City, "The Garden was the biggest Irish wake in history."

== Japan ==
In Japanese funerals, a wake is known as otsuya (お通夜, lit. 'passing night'). A somber ceremony held the night before the funeral, it typically consists of a Buddhist priest chanting sutras while guests, dressed in black, offer incense to the dead and condolence money to grieving relatives. Only close relatives keep vigil overnight.

The otsuya ceremony is very similar to the funeral proper, and Japanese families are increasingly choosing to skip it entirely.

== See also ==
- Shemira, the custom of "guarding" the body of the deceased in Judaism
- Nine nights
- Month's Mind
- Lying in state
- Memorial service (Orthodox)
- Viewing (funeral)
