= Edward Fletcher Cass =

British Miner, Banker and Historian (1937–2014)

Dr Eddie Cass ACIB
- Born: 12 February 1937; Manchester, England
- Died: 17 September 2014 (aged 77); Manchester, England
- Education: Manchester Metropolitan University, Edge Hill University
- Occupations: Miner; Banker; Historian; Folklorist

Edward Fletcher Cass ACIB (12 February 1937 – 17 September 2014) was a British miner, banker and authority on Lancashire folklore, industrial archaeology and the arts who was President of the Manchester Literary and Philosophical Society, Folklore Society, Lancashire and Cheshire Antiquarian Society and Society for Folk Life Studies.

== Career ==
=== Mining and banking ===
Cass was born in Manchester in 1937. He attended the Central High School (later Sheena Simon College) before starting work in a pharmacy and then as a coal miner at Bradford Colliery, Manchester, where he formed an attachment to the National Union of Mineworkers (though not always its leadership) and became friends with Jim Allen. From there he moved to William Deacon's Bank (later Royal Bank of Scotland), where he became a bank manager and studied part-time at the Manchester College of Commerce. He was later elected an Associate of the Chartered Institute of Bankers.

=== Academia ===
Cass continued his studies with an MA (1992) at Manchester Polytechnic (later Manchester Metropolitan University) with a thesis on ‘A Local Newspaper and Its Community: Literature and The Cotton Factory Times, 1885–1937’ and then studied his PhD (1996) at Edge Hill University (awarded by Lancaster University) on "The Cotton Factory Times, 1885–1937: A Family Newspaper and the Lancashire Cotton Community".

He was a Research Fellow of the National Centre for English Cultural Tradition at the University of Sheffield (1997–2004) and then a Research Fellow in The Elphinstone Institute at the University of Aberdeen (2004–14). Cass was involved with The Folklore Society as a Council Member (from 2001) then President (2008–11) and vice-president (2011–14) and was also involved in The Society for Folk Life Studies first as Council Member (2002–03) then Honorary Secretary (2003–08), vice-president (2008–11) and President (2011–14) and was awarded their Coote Lake Medal for ‘outstanding research in folklore’.

=== Other activities ===
Cass was Chairman of The Portico Library (1988–90) where he was also a curator of exhibitions, Secretary and Trustee of the National Museum of Labour History later the People's History Museum (1989–2002), Treasurer (1982–90) and President (1993–95) of the Manchester Literary and Philosophical Society, President of the Lancashire and Cheshire Antiquarian Society (2009–12) and was also involved with Manchester's Cornerhouse and Museum of Science and Industry. He also collected material relating to folklore, plays, chapbooks and literature. Much of this was donated to the Folklore Society and is now on deposit at the University of Sheffield. A collection of about 600 books of fiction and poetry relating to Lancashire is at Chetham's Library, Manchester.

== Select bibliography ==
- The Lancashire Pace-Egg Play: A Social History (FLS Books, 2001).
- The Pace-Egg Plays of the Calder Valley (FLS Books, 2004)
- (with M. J. Preston and Paul Smith), eds, The English Mumming Play: An Introductory Bibliography (FLS Books, 2000).
- with M. J. Preston and Paul Smith), "The Peace Egg Book: An Anglo-Irish Chapbook Connection Discovered" in Folklore (2003).
- Room, Room, Ladies and Gentlemen...: An Introduction to the English Mummers’ Play (English Folk Dance and Song Society in association with The Folklore Society, 2002).
- Cass, Eddie (2010). "T. Fairman Ordish and the British Folk Play". Folklore. 121: 1–11. doi:10.1080/00155870903481942. S2CID 161571618.
- Cass, Eddie (2011). "Alex Helm (1920–1970) and His Collection of Folk Performance Material". Folklore. 122: 1–15. doi:10.1080/0015587X.2011.537126. S2CID 162003060.
- Cass, Eddie (2012). "The James Madison Carpenter Collection of British Folk Plays". Folklore. 123: 1–22. doi:10.1080/0015587X.2012.642982. S2CID 161966400.

Professional and academic associations
Preceded by Donald Stephen Lowell Cardwell	President of Manchester Literary and Philosophical Society; 1993–95	Succeeded by Alexander Donnachie
Preceded by D. G. Wilson	Treasurer of the Manchester Literary and Philosophical Society; 1982–90	Succeeded by Alison J. Lever
Preceded by William Francis Ryan	President of The Folklore Society; 2008–11	Succeeded by Robert Cripps McDowall
Preceded by Eric Foster	President of Lancashire and Cheshire Antiquarian Society; 2009–12	Succeeded by Morris Garratt
