= Roy Porter (disambiguation) =

Roy Porter (1946–2002) was a British historian of medicine and psychiatry.

Roy Porter may also refer to:

- Roy Porter (drummer) (1923–1998), American jazz drummer
- Roy Porter (footballer) (1917–1998), Australian rules footballer
- Roy Porter (priest) (1921–2006), British Anglican priest, theologian and author

== See also ==
- Ron Porter (born 1945), American football player
- Ray Porter, American actor
