= London Lore =

2008 book by Steve Roud

London Lore: The Legends and Traditions of the World's Most Vibrant City
- Author: Steve Roud
- Language: English
- Subject: History and folklore of London
- Published: London
- Publisher: Arrow Books (Random House)
- Publication date: 2008
- Publication place: United Kingdom
- Media type: Print (paperback)
- Pages: 438
- ISBN: 9780099519867
- Dewey Decimal: 398.209421

London Lore: The Legends and Traditions of the World's Most Vibrant City is a 2008 book by Steve Roud about the folklore and history of London. Another edition was published in 2010.

== Background ==
The book presents various unique stories and traditions to come from historical London, such as Spring-heeled Jack and Pearly Kings and Queens.

== Reception ==
In The Guardian, Nicholas Lezard chose the book as a favourite and wrote "it doesn't matter if you're reading this in London, Glasgow or Smolensk: you're going to find this an enthralling book. Assuming, that is, that you are interested in superstitions, magic, legends, history and the endless parade of human credulity". Londonist described the book as "an excellent tome", while in the London Evening Standard Will Self wrote that he had been "enthralled" by it. The book was also praised by the historian Peter Ackroyd, in the Camden New Journal as "fascinating" and "admirably put together" and "a spellbinding study of our city's folklore" in the Newham Recorder.
