= Jennifer Westwood =

British author, broadcaster and folklorist

Jennifer Westwood (5 January 1940 – 12 May 2008) was a British author, broadcaster and folklorist. She was a Doctor of Philosophy with special interests in English Language, Anglo-Saxon and Old Norse. Her first book, Mediaeval Tales, was published in 1968. An active committee member of The Folklore Society from 1987 until 2003, she undertook a variety of duties including editing its publications and helping other authors. As a broadcaster, she worked on programmes produced for BBC Radio 4 and the corporation's Radio Norfolk. Commonly known as "Jen", after her second marriage she also authored books in the name of Jennifer Chandler.

== Early life and family ==
Born Jennifer Beatrice Fulcher in Norton Subcourse, a small village in Norfolk, on 5 January 1940, her father was employed as a bricklayer and her mother was a school teacher. Her primary school education was at Beccles in Suffolk, some eight miles distant from her home, although she had been taught to read by the time she was three-years-old. She then attended Sir John Leman Grammar School, again in Beccles, where she went on to secure a place at St Anne's College, Oxford to further her education, studying English and Anglo-Saxon Languages.

Following her marriage to Trevor Westwood who was undertaking a course at Loughborough University in Sports Education, she attended Cambridge University studying Old Norse. She travelled to Iceland and Scandinavia to carry out research for her degree. In 1968 she was divorced from her first husband. Her second marriage was to a management consultant, Brian Chandler. She had a son, Jonathan.

== Career ==
In 1968, her first book, Mediaeval Tales, was published; based on the stories she had researched while at Cambridge, the book was produced for the enjoyment of children. A compendium of adapted British medieval stories together with tales from the same era translated from French, Dr Jessie Roderick, the University of Maryland's assistant Professor of Education, felt it would give children in Upper Elementary Schools a good foundation in the topic. Westwood went on to pen several more books in the same genre as well as contributing to Rupert Bear Annuals. Writing in The Observer literary critic Naomi Lewis describes Westwood's next book, Gilgamesh and Other Babylonian Tales, also published in 1968, as providing an "informing scholarly commentary".

Westwood was an active researcher producing a large number of varied publications. Her 1985 book Albion: Guide to Legendary Britain was described by folklorist Jacqueline Simpson as the "first to tackle a representative cross-section [of legends] and offer a full, scholarly analysis of their sources and affiliations." Additionally, she felt it was suitable for general readers and specialists. In later years Simpson frequently worked closely with Westwood and she gave an indication of the methodology and aims the pair used when working together on their 2005 publication The Lore of the Land in her 2007 Katharine Briggs Memorial Lecture.

A series of guidebooks separated into county headings were produced between 1989 and 1992; Westwood contributed three volumes: Gothick Hertfordshire; Gothick Norfolk; and Gothick Cornwall. Juliette Wood, an academic and fellow folklorist, highlighted the sound research undertaken and considered the guides provided a happy medium by appealing to readers with a general interest in folklore as well as those seeking a more scholastic approach. During May 1996 Westwood attended the pilgrimage at Saintes-Maries-de-la-Mer; six months later she returned for the October pilgrimage having authored the 200-page book Sacred Journeys: An Illustrated Guide to Pilgrimages Around the World in the interim.

She became an active member of The Folklore Society committee in 1987. Some of the various duties she undertook for the Society included acting as Publications Officer, co-editor of the journal Folklore and the editing of FLS Books. In 2008 the Society awarded her the Coote Lake medal in recognition of her "outstanding research and scholarship." Only awarded occasionally, previous recipients include the folklorists Iona and Peter Opie, Professor E. O. James and M. M. Banks.

Westwood worked on programmes like "Land Lines" produced for BBC Radio 4 and the corporation's Radio Norfolk.

== Death ==
In 1998 Westwood was diagnosed with breast cancer but carried on her committee work until 2003. She died on 12 May 2008.

== Selected works ==
- Gilgamesh and Other Babylonian Tales (Heroic retellings from history and legend) (1968) ISBN 978-0370011097
- Isle of Gramarye: An Anthology of the Poetry of Magic (1970) ISBN 978-0246973573
- Tales and Legends (1971) ISBN 978-0698201385
- Stories of Charlemagne (1972) ISBN 978-0370012667
- Alfred the Great (Wayland kings and queens) (1978) ISBN 978-0853404200
- Albion: Guide to Legendary Britain (Hardback 1985) (Paperback 1995 ISBN 978-0586084168)
- Going to Squintum's: A Foxy Folk Tale (1985)
- Gothick Hertfordshire (1989) ISBN 978-0747800415
- Gothick Norfolk (1989) ISBN 978-0747800422
- Gothick Cornwall (1992) ISBN 978-0747801849
- Sacred Journeys: An Illustrated Guide to Pilgrimages Around the World (1997) ISBN 978-0805048452
- Mysteries: Lost Atlantis (Mysteries of the Ancient World) (1997) ISBN 978-0297823056
- Sacred Journeys: Paths for the New Pilgrim with Martin Palmer (2000) ISBN 978-1856750042
- The Atlas of Legendary Places with James Harpur (2001) ISBN 978-1568521503
- On Pilgrimage: Sacred Journeys Around the World (2003) ISBN 978-1587680151
- The Lore of the Land: A Guide to England's Legends, from Spring-heeled Jack to the Witches of Warboys with Jacqueline Simpson (2005) ISBN 978-0141007113
- The Penguin Book of Ghosts: Haunted England with Jacqueline Simpson (2008) ISBN 978-1846141010
- The Lore of Scotland: A guide to Scottish legends with Sophia Kingshill (2009) ISBN 978-1905211623
