= J. D. A. Widdowson =

British linguist and folklorist (born 1935)

J.D.A. Widdowson
- Born: 1935 (age 90–91); Sheffield, England
- Occupations: Linguist, folklorist
- Known for: Founding the Centre for English Cultural Tradition and Language (CECTAL), work on the Survey of English Dialects
- Awards: Coote Lake Medal (2000)
- Honors: Honorary degrees from Memorial University of Newfoundland and the University of Edinburgh

Academic background
- Education: University of Oxford; University of Leeds (MA); Memorial University of Newfoundland (PhD)

John David Allison Widdowson (born 1935) is a British linguist and folklorist, recognized for his significant contributions to the study of English language and cultural traditions. He is the founder of the Centre for English Cultural Tradition and Language (CECTAL) at the University of Sheffield, which later became the National Centre for English Cultural Tradition (NATCECT), and he served as its director for four decades.

Widdowson played a crucial role in the Survey of English Dialects, co-editing the Linguistic Atlas of England (1978) and co-authoring its accompanying Dictionary and Grammar (1994). His extensive work also includes the creation of the Bibliography of British Folklore (1996) and the establishment of the Centre for English Traditional Heritage (CETH) in 2000. He is an honorary graduate of Memorial University of Newfoundland and the University of Edinburgh and served as President of the Folklore Society from 1987 to 1990.

== Early life and education ==
Widdowson was born in Sheffield. He was educated at the University of Oxford and the University of Leeds, where he completed his MA dissertation on the dialect of Filey. He later earned his PhD in Newfoundland folklore from Memorial University, Canada.

== Career ==
In 1964 Widdowson founded the Sheffield Survey of Language and Folklore at the University of Sheffield, with the aim of collecting material and providing an academic resource centre. The Survey formed the basis of the Centre for English Cultural Tradition and Language (CECTAL) which was inaugurated in 1975 within the university's Department of English.

From 1975, CECTAL and the Institute of Dialect and Folklife Studies (University of Leeds), were the only two institutions which offered academic courses in Folklore in the UK. This remained the case until the latter's closure in 1984.

In 1997, CECTAL was renamed the National Centre for English Cultural Tradition (NATCECT). Widdowson - who had headed all its previous iterations - remained as director of NATCECT until 2004.

In collaboration with colleagues at the Institute of Dialect and Folklife Studies, Widdowson played a significant role in the Survey of English Dialects, being co-editor of the Survey's Linguistic Atlas of England (1978) and co-author of its Dictionary and Grammar (1994). He was also the lead for sites in England and Wales for the Atlas Linguarum Europae for the initial period of cassette-recorded interviews.

Between 1964 and 1999, Widdowson was editor of Lore and Language, a newsletter created as part of the Sheffield Survey of Language and Folklore, for researchers into the study of language and folklore. The back run of Lore and Language is now digitised and freely available from Memorial University.

In 1996, Widdowson published the Bibliography of British Folklore. It is an alphabetical listing of "British and Irish material [...] its primary focus is on printed books relevant to the study of folklore in England." The titles contained within were drawn primarily from three collections: The Herbert Halpert Folklore Library, Memorial University of Newfoundland; The Kenneth S. Goldstein Collection, Centre for the Study of Southern Culture, University of Mississippi; and The Library of the Folklore Society, University College London. The bibliography is now freely available online.

In 2000 Widdowson founded the Centre for English Traditional Heritage (CETH). One of CETH's research projects is the Survey of English Tradition, which aims to "collect information on all aspects of language and tradition in England and throughout the British Isles". Widdowson and Janet E Alton co-edit the centre's e-journal, Tradition Today.

In 2016, Folklore published an article by Widdowson, 'New Beginnings: Towards a National Folklore Survey', which called for leading organizations to "undertake a comprehensive survey of the rich variety of traditions in our present-day multicultural society".

== Recognition ==
Widdowson holds honorary degrees from Memorial University of Newfoundland and the University of Edinburgh.

Between 1987 and 1990 Widdowson served as President of the Folklore Society. He was awarded the Society's Coote Lake Medal, for outstanding research and scholarship, in 2000.

== Selected publications ==
- Widdowson, J. D. A (1977) If you don't be good: verbal social control in Newfoundland. St. Johns: Institute of Social and Economic Research, Memorial University of Newfoundland. OCLC 903568266.
- Orton, Harold; Sanderson, Stewart; Widdowson, John (1978). The linguistic atlas of England. London: Croom Helm. OCLC 466304700.
- Kirk, John M; Sanderson, Stewart; Widdowson, J. D. A (1985). Studies in linguistic geography: the dialects of English in Britain and Ireland. London: Croom Helm. OCLC 874511439.
- Upton, Clive; Sanderson, Stewart; Widdowson, J. D. A (1987). Word maps: a dialect atlas of England. London: Croom Helm. ISBN 978-0-7099-5409-5. OCLC 1014618497.
- Story, George Morley; Kirwin, William James; Widdowson, J. D. A (1990). Dictionary of Newfoundland English. Toronto: Univ. of Toronto Press. ISBN 978-0-8020-5887-4. OCLC 883390761.
- Upton, Clive; Parry, David; Widdowson, J. D. A (1994). Survey of English dialects: the dictionary and grammar. London [etc.: Routledge. ISBN 978-0-415-02029-9. OCLC 1120227862.
- Widdowson, J. D. A (2002). Little Jack and other Newfoundland folktales. St. John, Nfld.: Memorial University of Newfoundland, Folklore and Language Publications. ISBN 978-0-88901-363-6. OCLC51496439.
- Widdowson, J. D. A; Halpert, Herbert (2016). Folktales of Newfoundland: the resilience of the oral tradition. ISBN 978-1-138-84548-0. OCLC 1062271032.
- Kelsey, N. G. N. (2019). Alton, Janet E.; Widdowson, J. D. A. (eds). Games, rhymes, and wordplay of London children. Palgrave Macmillan. ISBN 978-3-030-02909-8.
