= Gladstone Book Prize =

Literary award

- Description: Debut history book on a non-British subject
- Sponsored by: Gladstone Memorial Trust
- Country: United Kingdom
- Presented by: Royal Historical Society

The Gladstone Book Prize is an annual prize awarded by the Royal Historical Society to debut authors for a history book published in Britain on any topic which is not primarily British history. The prize is named in honour of William Ewart Gladstone and was made possible by a grant by the Gladstone Memorial Trust. It was first awarded in 1998, the centenary of Gladstone's death. In 2025, the prize merged with the Whitfield Prize for debut works on British history to form the Royal Historical Society First Book Prize. In 2025 the combined prize was awarded to Laura Flannigan and Jules Skotnes-Brown.

== List of winners ==
- 1997 – Stuart Clark, Thinking With Demons: The Idea of Witchcraft in Early Modern Europe
- 1998 – Patrick Major, The Death of the KPD: Communism and Anti-Communism in West Germany, 1945-1956
- 1999 – Frances Stonor Saunders, Who Paid the Piper? The CIA and the Cultural Cold War, ISBN 1-86207-029-6
- 2000 – Matthew Innes, State and Society in the Middle Ages: The Middle Rhine Valley, 400-1000
- 2001 – Nora Berend, At the Gate of Christendom: Jews, Muslims and 'Pagans' in Medieval Hungary, c.1000-c.1300
- 2002
  - David Hopkin, Soldier and Peasant in French Popular Culture, 1766-1870
  - Guy Rowlands, The Dynastic State and the Army Under Louis XIV
- 2003
  - Norbert Peabody, Hindu Kingship and Polity in Precolonial India
  - Michael Rowe, From Reich to State: the Rhineland in the Revolutionary Age, 1780-1830
- 2004 – Nikolaus Wachsmann, Hitler’s Prisons: Legal Terror in Nazi Germany
- 2005 – Robert Foley, German Strategy and the Path to Verdun: Erich von Falkenhayn and the Development of Attrition, 1870-1850
- 2006 – James E. Shaw, The Justice of Venice: Authorities and Liberties in the Urban Economy, 1550-1700
- 2007 – Yasmin Khan, The Great Partition: the Making of India and Pakistan
- 2008 – Dr Caroline Dodds Pennock, Bonds of Blood: Gender, Lifecycle and Sacrifice in Aztec Culture (Palgrave Macmillan: 2008)
- 2009 – Alice Rio, Legal Practice and the Written Word in the Early Middle Ages: Frankish Formulae, c.500-1000 (Cambridge University Press: 2009)
- 2010 – Natalie A. Zacek, Settler Society in the English Leeward Islands, c. 1670-1776 (Cambridge University Press: 2010)
- 2011 – Wendy Ugolini, Experiencing War as the ‘Enemy Other’: Italian Scottish Experience in World War II, (Manchester University Press: 2011)
- 2012 – Joel Isaac, Working Knowledge: Making the Human Sciences from Parsons to Kuhn, (Harvard University Press: 2012)
- 2013 – Sean A. Eddie, Freedom’s Price: Serfdom, Subjection, & Reform in Prussia, 1648-1848 (Oxford University Press: 2013)
- 2015
  - Andrew Arsan, Interlopers of Empire: The Lebanese Diaspora in Colonial French West Africa (Hurst, 2014)
  - Lucie Ryzova, The Age of the Efendiyya: Passages to Modernity in National-Colonial Egypt (Oxford University Press, 2014)
- 2016 – Emma Hunter, Political Thought and the Public Sphere in Tanzania (Cambridge University Press, 2015) ISBN 978-1-107-08817-7
- 2017 – Claire Eldridge, From Empire to Exile: History and Memory Within the Pied-Noir and Harki Communities, 1962–2012 (Manchester University Press, 2016)
- 2018 – Matthew S. Champion, The Fullness of Time: Temporalities of the Fifteenth-Century Low Countries (University of Chicago Press, 2017)
- 2019 – Duncan Hardy, Associative Political Culture in the Holy Roman Empire: Upper Germany, 1346-1521 (Oxford University Press, 2018)
- 2020 – Caillan Davenport, A History of the Roman Equestrian Order (Cambridge University Press, 2019)
- 2021 – Tom Stammers, The Purchase of the Past: Collecting Culture in Post-Revolutionary Paris, c.1790-1890 (Cambridge University Press, 2020).
- 2023 - Jennifer Keating, On Arid Ground: Political Ecologies of Empire in Russian Central Asia (OUP, 2022)
- 2024 - Somak Biswas, Passages through India: Indian Gurus, Western Disciples and the Politics of Indophilia, 1890–1940 (Cambridge University Press, 2023)
- 2025
  - Jules Skotnes-Brown, Segregated Species: Pests, Knowledge, and Boundaries in South Africa, 1910–1948 (Johns Hopkins University Press, 2024)
  - Laura Flanagan, Royal Justice and the Making of the Tudor Commonwealth, 1485-1547 (Cambridge University Press, 2024)

== See also ==
- List of history awards
- Prizes named after people
