= Peter Burke (historian) =

British historian and professor (born 1937)

Peter Burke FBA FRHistS
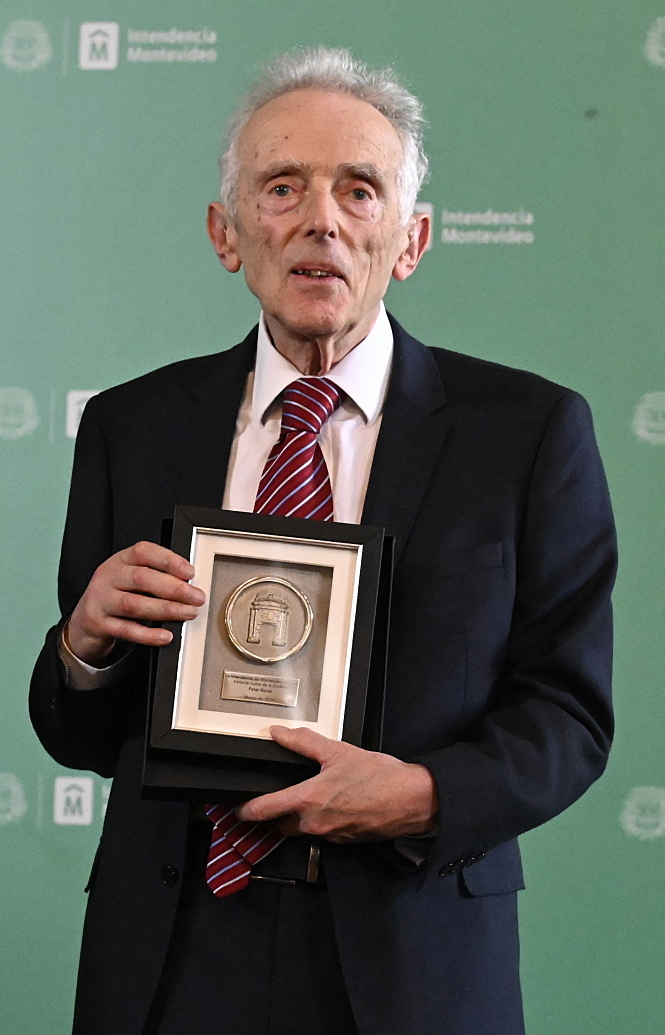
- Burke in 2024
- Born: Ulick Peter Burke; 16 August 1937 (age 89); Stanmore, England
- Spouse: Maria Lúcia Garcia Pallares-Burke

Academic background
- Education: St Ignatius College, Enfield
- Alma mater: St John's College, Oxford; St Antony's College, Oxford

Academic work
- Discipline: History
- Sub-discipline: Cultural history; Early modern Europe; Renaissance
- Institutions: University of Sussex; Emmanuel College, Cambridge
- Doctoral students: David Hopkin

Ulick Peter Burke FBA FRHistS (born 16 August 1937) is a British historian and professor.

== Early life and education ==
Peter Burke was born to a Roman Catholic father and Jewish mother (who later converted to Roman Catholicism). He was educated at St Ignatius College, Enfield, a Jesuit school, before completing his undergraduate and doctoral studies at St John's College and St Antony's College, University of Oxford.

== Career ==
From 1962 to 1979, Burke was a member of the School of European Studies at University of Sussex, before moving to the University of Cambridge, where he holds the title of professor emeritus of cultural history and fellow of Emmanuel College, Cambridge. Burke is celebrated as a historian of the early modern era who emphasizes the relevance of social and cultural history to modern issues.

Burke is not only known for his work on the Modern Age but also for his research on cultural history across its entire spectrum. As a polyglot, he has managed on the one hand to incorporate information from a good part of Europe and has also achieved good diffusion of his books. They have been translated into more than thirty languages. In 1998, he was awarded the Erasmus Medal of the European Academy, and he holds honorary doctorates from the Universities of Lund, Copenhagen and Bucharest.

== Personal and family ==
Burke is married to the Brazilian historian Maria Lúcia Garcia Pallares-Burke who is the author of two books (in one of which she collaborated with her husband).

== Selected publications ==
Among his most important works are:

- The Italian Renaissance (1972)
- Tradition and Innovation in Renaissance Italy (1974)
- Popular Culture in Early Modern Europe (1978)
- Sociology and History (1980)
- Montaigne (1981)
- The Renaissance (1987)
- The French Historical Revolution: The Annales School 1929–89 (1990)
- History and Social Theory (1991)
- New Perspectives on Historical Writing (1991) (editor and contributor)
- The Fabrication of Louis XIV (1992)
- The Art of Conversation (1993)
- The Fortunes of the Courtier: The European Reception of Castiglione's Cortegiano (1995)
- Varieties of Cultural history (1997)
- The European Renaissance: Centres and Peripheries (1998)
- A Social History of Knowledge (2000)
- Eyewitnessing (2000)
- A Social History of the Media: From Gutenberg to the Internet (2002) (with Asa Briggs)
- New Perspectives on Historical Writing (2001)
- History and Historians in the Twentieth Century (2002)
- What is Cultural History? (2004)
- Languages and Communities in Early Modern Europe (2004)
- Gilberto Freyre: Social Theory in the Tropics (2008) (with Maria Lúcia Garcia Pallares-Burke)
- Cultural Hybridity (2009)
- A Social History of Knowledge Volume II: From the Encyclopédie to Wikipedia (2012)
- What is the History of Knowledge? (2015)
- The Polymath: A Cultural History from Leonardo da Vinci to Susan Sontag (2020)
- Ignorance: A Global History (Yale University Press 2023)
