= Yasmin Khan =

Historian

Professor Yasmin Khan
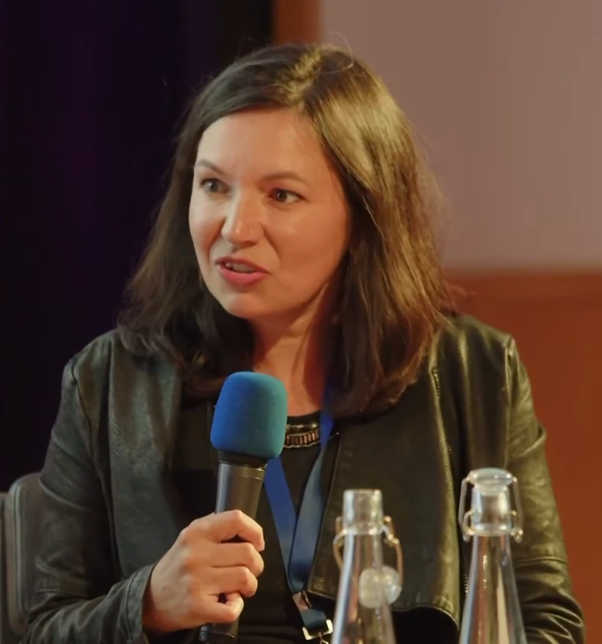
- Khan in 2022
- Born: 1977 (age 48–49)
- Other name: Yasmin Cordery Khan
- Occupations: Historian, novelist and broadcaster
- Awards: Gladstone Book Prize

Academic background
- Education: St Peter's College, Oxford (BA); St Antony's College, Oxford (DPhil)

Academic work
- Discipline: History
- Sub-discipline: Colonial history; History of the British Empire; Colonial India; History of Pakistan
- Institutions: University of Edinburgh; Royal Holloway, University of London; Kellogg College, Oxford
- Notable works: The Great Partition: The Making of India and Pakistan

Yasmin Cordery Khan is a British historian, novelist and broadcaster whose work focuses on the British Empire, Colonial India and the decolonisation of South Asia. She is a Fellow of Kellogg College, Oxford and Professor of Modern History based in the Oxford University Department for Continuing Education.

== Life and education ==
Khan is from London and of Pakistani and Irish descent. Khan completed her BA in History at St Peter's College, Oxford. Khan completed her DPhil at St Antony's College, Oxford in 2005 in Imperial and Commonwealth History.

== Career ==
Khan held positions at the University of Edinburgh and Royal Holloway, University of London before joining Kellogg College in 2012. Khan's work focuses on decolonisation, British migration histories, British Indian history, the Second World War and the End of Empire. In October 2024 she was awarded the Title of Distinction of Professor of Modern History by the University of Oxford.

Khan is a member of the editorial board of History Workshop Journal and a trustee of the Charles Wallace India Trust. She served as Kellogg College's senior tutor between 2019 and 2022. Khan was a judge of the 2022 Cundill History Prize administered by McGill University.

Khan's publications include The Great Partition: The Making of India and Pakistan (2007), which won the Gladstone Book Prize from the Royal Historical Society and was long-listed for the Orwell Prize, and The Raj at War: A People's History of India's Second World War (2015). She has written for the Guardian newspaper, and appeared on Channel 4 News and BBC Radio.

Her first work of fiction, Edgware Road, was published in 2022. A second novel, Overland, was published in 2024.

=== Radio appearances ===
Khan appeared on a In Our Time in 2012 discussing the life and work of Annie Besant.

Khan presented a three-part series for BBC 2 in 2018 tracing the stories of ship passengers going between Britain and India based on ships' passenger lists during the three decades before Indian independence in 1947. The first episode, based on the passenger list of the Viceroy of India, included the story of Mulk Raj Anand.

In 2020, Khan presented a three-part series with Alice Roberts for BBC 2 on two major archeological digs carried out in London and Birmingham in preparation for building terminals for the HS2 high-speed railway.

== Selected publications ==
- The Great Partition: The Making of India and Pakistan. Yale University Press. 2007. ISBN 978-0-300-12078-3.
- The Raj at War: A People's History of India's Second World War. London: The Bodley Head. 2015. ISBN 978-1-84792-120-8.
- Edgware Road. London: Head of Zeus. 2022. ISBN 9781801107341.
