= Ian Russell (folklorist) =

British folklorist (1947–2026)

Ian Russell, MBE (17 February 1947 – 16 May 2026) was a British folklorist, most noted for his research into singing traditions in the English Pennines.

== Background ==
Ian Russell was born in Aberdeen, Scotland on 17 February 1947, to William and Joan Russell. He died on 16 May 2026, aged 79.

== Research ==
Beginning in 1969, Russell conducted extensive fieldwork in South Yorkshire and North Derbyshire, particularly on regional folksong and traditional drama.

Whilst working as a teacher, Russell undertook a part-time PhD through the Institute of Dialect and Folklife Studies, at the University of Leeds. His thesis was titled Traditional Singing in West Sheffield, 1970-2 and was completed in 1977.

Russell has made a particular study of village carolling in the Pennines. The emergence of carol singing in this part of England has been dated to the 18th century and consists of a style and repertoire very different to the conception of carols which emerged in the Victorian period.

Copies of Russell's recordings have been placed in the British Library Sound Archive. Russell has also compiled edited volumes of carols and compiled CDs of carolling from the Pennines.

From 1994, Russell directed a biennial Festival of Village Carols at Sheffield.

Between 1980 and 1993, Russell was editor of Folk Music Journal, published by the English Folk Dance and Song Society (EFDSS). His editorship was praised for "raising the stature of the Journal": widening the range of its contributors and increasing in size its reviews section.

In July 1998, Russell was one of the convenors of Folksong: Tradition and Revival, a conference at the University of Sheffield, organised by the National Centre for English Cultural Tradition, which marked the centenary of the founding of the Folk Song Society (later EFDSS).

== Elphinstone Institute ==
Russell became Director of the Elphinstone Institute at the University of Aberdeen in 1999, a post he held until retirement in 2014.

During Russell's time as Director of the Institute, he convened conferences for the British Forum for Ethnomusicology in Aberdeen in 2004 and 2008 and the 27th meeting of the European Seminar in Ethnomusicology (ESEM) in September 2011. In 2013, Russell co-edited a published collection of papers from this conference, Taking Part in Music: Case Studies in Ethnomusicology.

He was also key to the creation of the North Atlantic Fiddle Convention, conferences of which were held at the Elphinstone Institute, with proceedings from them appearing in print, co-edited by Russell.

The Elphinstone Institute "specialises in the ethnology and folklore of Northern Scotland" and whilst Director, Russell's broadened his research interests into the traditional cultures of North East Scotland, including sacred singing, flute bands in coastal communities and notions of festivalisation relating to community practice.

== Recognition ==
The Folklore Society awarded Russell its Coote Lake Medal in 1987, for "outstanding research and scholarship". In 1998, he was awarded the Gold Badge of the English Folk Dance and Song Society, the Society's highest honour.

In 2016, Russell was named a Point of Light, by British Prime Minister Theresa May in recognition of his work with Village Carols. The Points of Light award "recognises outstanding individual volunteers who make a positive change in their community and inspire others".

In 2020, Russell was awarded an MBE in the Queen's Birthday honours.

== Selected publications ==
- Russell, Ian (1979). "'Here Comes Me and Our Old Lass, Short of Money and Short of Brass': A Survey of Traditional Drama in North East Derbyshire 1970-8". Folk Music Journal. 3 (5): 399-478. JSTOR 4522053
- Russell, Ian (1987). “Stability and Change in a Sheffield Singing Tradition.” Folk Music Journal. 5 (3): 317–58. JSTOR 4522241
- Russell, Ian (2003). "The Singer’s the Thing: The Individual and Group Identity in a Pennine Singing Tradition". Folk Music Journal. 8 (3): 266-281. JSTOR 4522687
- Russell, Ian and Atkinson, David (eds). (2004). Folk Song: Tradition, Revival, and Re-Creation. Aberdeen: The Elphinstone Institute, University of Aberdeen. ISBN 978-0-9545682-0-7. OCLC 55524402.
- Russell, Ian (2006). "Working with Tradition: Towards a Partnership Model of Fieldwork". Folklore, 117 (1): 15-32, doi:10.1080/00155870500479877.
- Russell, Ian and Alburger, Mary Anne. (eds.) (2006) Play It Like It Is: Fiddle and Dance Studies from around the North Atlantic. Aberdeen: The Elphinstone Institute, University of Aberdeen. ISBN 978-0-9545682-3-8. OCLC 156780603.
- Russell, Ian (2006). "Competing with Ballads (and Whisky?): The Construction, Celebration, and Commercialization of North-East Scottish Identity". Folk Music Journal. 9 (2): 170-191. JSTOR 4522806
- Russell, Ian (2009). "Scotland's Traditional Music and Song as Cultural, Social, and Economic Assets". Journal of Irish and Scottish Studies. 2 (2): 123-137. https://www.abdn.ac.uk/riiss/content-images/JISSv2.2_OpenAccess.pdf
- Russell, Ian (2010). "Songs for the Bothy: Re-Creating Realities for a Fictive World". Folklore Historian, vol. 27, pp. 27–50
- Russell, Ian (2011). "Negotiating the Sacred and the Secular: Vernacular Performance in a North-East Scottish Coastal Community", Musiké: International Journal of Ethnomusicological Studies. 3 (5-6): 165-180.
- Russell, Ian (2011, new edn 2018) The Sheffield Book of Village Carols. Sheffield: Village Carols. ISBN 978-0-9524871-3-5, OCLC 1153716957.
- Russell, Ian (2012, new edn 2020) The Derbyshire Book of Village Carols. Sheffield: Village Carols. OCLC 1246517899.
- Russell, Ian and Ingram, Catherine (eds.) (2013) Taking part in music: case studies in ethnomusicology. Aberdeen: Aberdeen University Press. ISBN 978-1-85752-001-9. OCLC 941305019.

== Related material ==
Benjamin Botkin folklife lecture, American Folklife Center, Library of Congress, 'The "Hidden" carols: a Christmas singing tradition in the English Pennines', 7 January 2014
