= Sandra Billington =

Academic, author and actress

Sandra Billington is an academic, author and actress who was first a lecturer and then a reader in Renaissance Theatre at the University of Glasgow between 1979 and 2003. She became a Fellow of the Royal Society of Edinburgh in 1998. She is a graduate of the University of Cambridge (Lucy Cavendish 1972). She is most noted for her work A Social History of the Fool which, in 1984, won the Folklore Society's Katharine Briggs Folklore Award.

== Selected publications ==
- Billington, Sandra. 1984. A Social History of the Fool. New York: Harvester Press
- Billington, S., & Aldhouse-Green, M. J. (Eds.). (1996). The concept of the goddess. Psychology Press.
- Billington, S. (1990). Butchers and fishmongers: their historical contribution to London's festivity. Folklore, 101(1), 97–103.
