= Marion Bowman =

British academic (born 1955)

Marion Bowman (born 1955) is a British academic working on the borders of religious studies and folklore and ethnology. She is Professor Emerita in Religious Studies, The Open University where she was previously Professor of Vernacular Religion.

Bowman is a long-standing researcher into New Age and alternative spiritualities. Her research focus is predominantly contemporary spirituality in the UK and Europe, particularly "the practices and beliefs of individuals both within and on the margins of institutional religion".

== Education ==
Bowman began her university education at Glasgow University but moved to Lancaster University to study under Prof Ninian Smart.

Bowman completed her MA in Folklore at Memorial University, Newfoundland: her dissertation was on devotion to St Gerard Majella in Newfoundland. She completed her PhD at the University of Glamorgan in 1998 on 'Vernacular Religion and Contemporary Spirituality: Studies in Religious Experience and Expression'.

== Career ==
From 1990 to 2000 Bowman was based at Bath Spa University in the department of Study of Religions.

In 2000 Bowman joined the Religious Studies department at The Open University. She was Head of Department between 2010 and 2013.

Bowman has carried out a long term study of Glastonbury, seeing it as a sight of "significant pilgrimage destination and microcosm of contemporary spirituality and vernacular religiosity".

Bowman is a member of the Steering Committee of the Baron Thyssen Centre for the Study of Ancient Material Religion, based in the Classical Studies Department at the Open University. She was also a Co-Investigator on the Arts Humanities Research Council (AHRC) funded project Pilgrimage and England’s Cathedrals, Past and Present, which ran from 2014-2018.

The research of Bowman and Open University colleagues into alternative religions has been seen to have a number of impacts: both at an academic level in influencing research agendas but also in influencing a more positive public awareness of practitioners of alternative religions.

== Recognition ==
Bowman has been a visiting lecturer or professor at a number of European universities, including the University of Oslo, Norway; University of Bayreuth, Germany; University of Pecs, Hungary and University of Tartu, Estonia.

She is a former president of the British Association for the Study of Religions and a former Vice-President of both the European Association for the Study of Religions and Theology and Religious Studies UK.

Between 2002 and 2005, Bowman served as president of the Folklore Society: her Presidential Lectures derived from her research into Glastonbury and Newfoundland. She is an International Fellow of the American Folklore Society.

== Selected publications ==
- Bowman, Marion (April 1993). "Reinventing the celts". Religion. 23 (2): 147–156. doi:10.1006/reli.1993.1013.
- Bowman, Marion (1995). "The commodification of the Celt: New Age/Neo-pagan consumerism". In Brewer, Teri (ed.). The Marketing of Tradition: Perspectives on Folklore, Tourism and the Heritage Industry. Hisarlik. ISBN 978-1-874312-21-5. OCLC 35555136.
- Bowman, Marion (May 1995). "The noble savage and the global village: Cultural evolution in new age and neo‐pagan THOUGHT". Journal of Contemporary Religion. 10 (2): 139–149. doi:10.1080/13537909508580734.
- Bowman, Marion (January 1998). "Belief, Legend and Perceptions of the Sacred in Contemporary Bath". Folklore. 109 (1–2): 25–31. doi:10.1080/0015587X.1998.9715958.
- Sutcliffe, Steven; Bowman, Marion, eds. (2000). Beyond New Age: Exploring Alternative Spirituality. Edinburgh University Press. ISBN 978-0-7486-0998-7. OCLC 43969544.
- Bowman, Marion (2001). "The People's Princess: Religion and Politics in the Mourning for Diana". In Barna, Gábor (ed.). Politics and Folk Religion. Department of Ethnology, University of Szeged. ISBN 978-963-482-400-8. OCLC 61726708.
- Bowman, Marion (2002). "Contemporary Celtic spirituality". In Pearson, Joanne (ed.). Belief Beyond Boundaries: Wicca, Celtic Spirituality and the New Age. Ashgate. ISBN 978-0-7546-0744-1. OCLC 48098557.
- Bowman, Marion (March 2003). "Vernacular religion and nature: The 'Bible of the Folk' tradition in Newfoundland". Folklore. 114 (3): 285–295. doi:10.1080/0015587032000145333. S2CID 144203410.
- Bowman, Marion (December 2004). "Presidential address given to the Folklore society, March 2004[1]: Procession and possession in glastonbury: continuity, change and the manipulation of tradition". Folklore. 115 (3): 273–285. doi:10.1080/0015587042000284266. S2CID 216643691.
- Bowman, Marion (August 2006). "The Holy Thorn Ceremony: Revival, Rivalry and Civil Religion in Glastonbury: Presidential Address Given To the Folklore society, March 2005". Folklore. 117 (2): 123–140. doi:10.1080/00155870600707805. S2CID 161605141.
- Bowman, Marion (June 2009). "Learning from experience: The value of analysing Avalon". Religion. 39 (2): 161–168. doi:10.1016/j.religion.2009.01.016. S2CID 144329975.
- Bowman, Marion; Valk, Ulo (2014). Vernacular Religion in Everyday Life: Expressions of Belief. Routledge. ISBN 978-1-317-54354-1. OCLC 893333268.
- Bowman, Marion (27 June 2014). "Far from the madding crowd: Glastonbury's spiritual side". The Conversation.
- Bowman, Marion (27 July 2016). "The contented collector: materiality, relationality and the power of things". Material Religion. 12 (3): 384–386. doi:10.1080/17432200.2016.1192159. S2CID 193315973.
- Coleman, Simon; Bowman, Marion (2 January 2019). "Religion in cathedrals: pilgrimage, heritage, adjacency, and the politics of replication in Northern Europe". Religion. 49 (1): 1–23. doi:10.1080/0048721X.2018.1515341. S2CID 149551939.
- Bowman, Marion; Sepp, Tiina (2 January 2019). "Caminoisation and Cathedrals: replication, the heritagisation of religion, and the spiritualisation of heritage". Religion. 49 (1): 74–98. doi:10.1080/0048721X.2018.1515325. S2CID 150171323.
- Bowman, Marion (September 2020). "'Rehabilitating' Pilgrimage in Scotland: Heritage, Protestant Pilgrimage, and Caledonian Caminos". Numen. 67 (5–6): 453–482. doi:10.1163/15685276-12341598. S2CID 225314281.
