= David Hopkin (historian) =

English historian and academic

David Hopkin FRHistS
- Born: David Matthew Hopkin; 1966 (age 59–60)
- Occupations: Historian and academic
- Title: Professor of European Social History
- Children: 3

Academic background
- Education: Churchill College, Cambridge (BA, PhD)
- Doctoral advisor: Peter Burke; Robert Scribner

Academic work
- Discipline: History
- Sub-discipline: France in the long nineteenth century; Social history; Folklore
- Institutions: Churchill College, Cambridge; University of Glasgow; Hertford College, Oxford

David Matthew Hopkin FRHistS (born 1966) is an English historian, who specialises in European social history and folklore in the eighteenth and nineteenth centuries. He is Professor of European Social History at the University of Oxford and Fellow and Tutor in History at Hertford College.

Hopkin has called for historians to engage more with the subjects of folklore, writing in 2004 that historians should pay “…due attention not just to folklore collections, but to folklorists’ ideas and methods”.

== Education ==
Hopkin studied history at Churchill College, University of Cambridge, from 1985 to 1988.

From 1994 to 1997 he undertook a PhD, supervised by Peter Burke and Robert Scribner, before a spell as a Junior Research Fellow at Churchill College.

== Career ==
From 1999 to 2005, Hopkin was based at the Department of Economic and Social History, University of Glasgow, as first a lecturer then senior lecturer.

Hopkin joined Hertford College, University of Oxford, as Fellow and Tutor in History in 2005. He was made Professor of European Social History in 2017.

== Research ==
Hopkin has authored and edited five books and numerous research articles. He has been a key collaborator in a number of large-scale historical research projects, including the BEROSE International Encyclopaedia of the Histories of Anthropology.

Hopkins's first monograph, Soldier and Peasant in French Popular Culture was praised as the “product of meticulous research and high intelligence, expressed in superb prose” and was jointly awarded the Gladstone Book Prize in 2002.

His second monograph, Voices of the People in Nineteenth-Century France, was awarded the Folklore Society's Katharine Briggs Prize in 2012.

In 2016, Hopkin was awarded a Leverhulme Trust Fellowship for the project ‘Lacemakers – Poverty, Religion and Gender in a Transnational Work Culture’, which sought to "provide the first full length study of the shared work culture of lacemakers across nineteenth-century Europe; a history of women's experience of poverty constructed from folk songs and stories".

== Recognition ==
In 2023, Hopkin was elected President of the Folklore Society. Hopkin is also a Fellow of the Royal Historical Society.

== Personal life ==
Hopkin is married and has three children.

== Selected publications ==
- Hopkin, David (2003). "Female Soldiers and the Battle of the Sexes in France: the Mobilization of a Folk Motif". History Workshop Journal. 56 (1): 78–104. doi:10.1093/hwj/56.1.78. ISSN 1477-4569.
- Hopkin, David M. (2003). Soldier and peasant in French popular culture, 1766-1870. Studies in history new series. Woodbridge (GB): Boydell press. ISBN 978-0-86193-258-0.
- Hopkin, David (2004). "Storytelling, fairytales and autobiography: some observations on eighteenth- and nineteenth-century French soldiers' and sailors' memoirs". Social History. 29 (2): 186–198. doi:10.1080/0307102042000207840. ISSN 0307-1022.
- Lagadec, Yann; Perréon, Stéphane; Hopkin, David M. (2009). La bataille de Saint-Cast: Bretagne, 11 septembre 1758 entre histoire et mémoire. Collection Histoire. Rennes [Rennes]: Presses universitaires de Rennes Société d'histoire et d'archéologie de Bretagne. ISBN 978-2-7535-0948-1.
- Hopkin, David M. (2012). Voices of the people in nineteenth-century France. Cambridge Social and cultural histories series. Cambridge New York: Cambridge University Press. ISBN 978-0-521-51936-6.
- Baycroft, Timothy; Hopkin, David M. (2012). Folklore and nationalism in Europe during the long nineteenth century. National cultivation of culture. Leiden Boston: Brill. ISBN 978-90-04-21158-2.
- Hopkin, David (2016). "Intimacies and Intimations: Storytelling between Servants and Masters in Nineteenth-Century France". Journal of Social History. doi:10.1093/jsh/shw094. ISSN 0022-4529.
- Hopkin, David (2018). "Cinderella of the Breton Polders: Suffering and Escape in the Notebooks of a Young, Female Farm-Servant in the 1880s*". Past & Present. 238 (1): 121–163. doi:10.1093/pastj/gtx054. ISSN 0031-2746.
- Guillorel, Eva; Hopkin, David M.; Pooley, William (2018). Rhythms of revolt: European traditions and memories of social conflict in oral culture. Abingdon: Routledge. ISBN 978-1-138-20504-8.
- Hopkin, David (2022). "'My Gunners will burn your houses, my soldiers will pillage them': what French people were singing about when they sang about Napoleon". French History. 36 (1): 100–120. doi:10.1093/fh/crab018. ISSN 0269-1191.
- Hopkin, David; Roper, Jonathan (2023). "The Folklore Buried in Dictionaries". Folklore. 134 (2): 143–154. doi:10.1080/0015587X.2023.2176993. ISSN 0015-587X.
- Hopkin, David (2023). "Broken to the trade: French lacemakers' tools as sources of pride and pain". French History. doi:10.1093/fh/crad042. ISSN 0269-1191.
