= Leslie F. Newman =

British chemist and folklorist

Leslie Frank Newman (1882–1973) was a British chemist and folklorist.

== Early life and education ==
Newman came from a farming family and was educated at Bishop's Stortford College and at Cambridge University.

== Chemist ==
He was a noted agricultural chemist and a Fellow of St. Catherine's, Cambridge. In 1919 he published A Course of Practical Chemistry for Agricultural Students with H.A.D Neville.

== Folklorist ==
Newman had a close knowledge of the East Anglian countryside, and a notable interest in folklore and related areas. He was a member of the Folklore Society, contributing articles to the Society's journal Folklore on a range of topics. He served as the Folklore Society's President between 1943 and 1945.

15 volumes of newspaper cuttings collected by Newman, and dating from the early 1920s to the 1970s, are now housed in the Special Collections of the University of Sheffield Library. The cuttings come from a range of magazines and newspapers, and include articles on topics such as folklore, country customs, witchcraft and ghosts.

== Selected publications ==
- Newman, L.F. (1942). "Some Notes on the Folklore of Poultry". Folklore. 53 (2): 104–111.
- Newman, L.F. (1942). "Some References to the Couvade in Literature". Folklore 53 (3): 148–157.
