= Sona Burstein =

Museum curator, folklorist and historian

Sona Rosa Burstein (1897–1971) was a museum curator, folklorist and historian of gerontology.

== Education ==
Born in 1897, she qualified from the University of Wales in 1920 with an honours degree in Classics. In 1928 she qualified from Oxford University with a postgraduate diploma in Anthropology (with a distinction in Social Anthropology).

== Career ==
Burstein joined the staff of the Wellcome Historical Medical Museum in 1928, where she worked till her retirement in 1957. Her focus was on the cataloguing and display of Wellcome's ethnographic collections.

Burstein also researched topics around gerontology, a research interest which had begun during her time at Oxford.

== Folklorist ==
Burstein was a long-standing member of the Folklore Society, joining the Society in 1923 and later serving as its President between 1956 and 1959. She was also a Fellow of the Royal Anthropological Institute (elected in 1932).

The Presidential Addresses Burstein gave to the Folklore Society showcased the diversity of her interests: 'George Laurence Gomme and the Science of Folklore' (1957), 'Eighty Years of Folklore: Evaluations and Revaluations' (1958) and 'Folklore, Rumour and Prejudice' (1959).

== Selected publications ==
- Burstein, S. R. (1946-07-01). "Gerontology". Postgraduate Medical Journal. 22 (249): 185–190. doi:10.1136/pgmj.22.249.185. ISSN 0032-5473. PMC 2478352. PMID 20276642.
- Burstein, S. R. (1948), 'Care of the Aged in England: From Mediaeval Times to the End of the 16th Century'. Bulletin of the History of Medicine. 22 (6): 738–746. ISSN 0007-5140. JSTOR 44442233.
- Burstein, S. R. (1952-04-16). "Public health and prevention of disease in primitive communities". The Medical Press. 227 (16): 370–375. PMID 14940255.
- Burstein, S. R. (1953-08). "Objectives and techniques in the psychosocial study of old age". Geriatrics. 8 (8): 453–458. ISSN 0016-867X. PMID 13068598.
- Burstein, S. R. (1955-04). "The historical background of gerontology". Geriatrics. 10 (4): 189–193. ISSN 0016-867X. PMID 14366241.
- Burstein, S. R. (1956-03-01). "Demonology and Medicine in the Sixteenth and Seventeenth Centuries". Folklore. 67 (1): 16–33. doi:10.1080/0015587X.1956.9717516. ISSN 0015-587X.
- Burstein, S. R. (1957-08). "The foundations of geriatrics". Geriatrics. 12 (8): 494–499. ISSN 0016-867X. PMID 13448391
- Burstein, S. R. (1961-09-01). "Some Modern Books on Witchcraft". Folklore. 72 (3): 520–534. doi:10.1080/0015587X.1961.9717297. ISSN 0015-587X.
