= Juliette Wood =

British historian and folklorist

Juliette Wood is an American historian and lecturer at Cardiff University. She specializes in Celtic and Medieval history, magic, and folklore. She is a former director of the Folklore Society and an Honorary Fellow of Amgueddfa Cymru – Museum Wales.

Wood received her PhD from the University of Pennsylvania in 1975. Her doctoral thesis was entitled ‘Geographical Themes in Medieval Celtic and Italian Folklore'. She received an MLitt from the University of Oxford, a master's from the University of Pennsylvania, and a master's from Aberystwyth University. Before her studies, Wood was a ballet dancer in New York City.

Wood has written extensively on mythology, magic, folklore and Celtic history. She has provided expert consultation for television and radio, including the BBC. She was a consultant for the film 'Faeries', for the documentary series 'Myths and Monsters', and for the documentary series 'Tony Robinson's Gods & Monsters'. She contributed to BBC Radio Four's In Our Time on The Mabinogion and Faust. Wood is currently Reviews Editor for the Folklore Society.

== Bibliography ==
- Fantastic Creatures in Mythology and Folklore (London: Bloomsbury, 2018)
- The Little Book of Celtic Wisdom (London: Duncan Baird, 2012)
- Eternal Chalice. The Enduring Legend of the Holy Grail (London: Bloomsbury, 2008)
- The Celts: Life, Myth and Art (London: Duncan Baird, 2001)
- The Celtic Book of Living and Dying: The Illustrated Guide to Celtic Wisdom (London: Duncan Baird, 2000)
- A Coven of Scholars: Margaret Murray and Her Working Methods, with Caroline Oates (London: Folklore Society, 1998)
