= Guy Rowlands =

British academic and historian

Guy Rowlands is a British academic and historian specialising in the history of France. In 2002 he was the winner of the Gladstone Book Prize awarded annually by the Royal Historical Society. He serves as Secretary for the Society for the Study of French History and was the Director of the Centre for French History and Culture at the University of St Andrews.

His research has mainly concerned seventeenth- and eighteenth-century France, especially France's mobilisation for war between 1661 and 1783. He is best known for the book The Dynastic State and the Army under Louis XIV: Royal Service and Private Interest, 1661 to 1701 which analysed the growth of the army under Louis XIV and stressed the role of noble families in the organisation of the state.

== Publications ==
- The Third Reign of Louis XIV, c.1682-1715, eds. Julia Prest and Guy Rowlands (Routledge, 2016).
- The Financial Decline of a Great Power: War, Influence, and Money in Louis XIV's France (2012)
- St Andrews Studies in French History and Culture (2010)
- The Dynastic State and the Army under Louis XIV: Royal Service and Private Interest, 1661 to 1701 (Cambridge University Press, 2002)
- "The Ethos of Blood and Changing Values? Robe, Épée and the French Armies, 1661 to 1715" in Seventeenth-Century French Studies, 19 (1997)
- "Louis XIV, Aristocratic Power and the Elite Units of the French Army" in French History, 13 (1999)
- "Louis XIV, Vittorio Amedeo II and French Military Failure in Italy, 1689-1696" in English Historical Review, 115 (2000)
- "Louis XIV et la « stratégie de cabinet ». Mythe et réalité" in Revue historique des Armées, 222 (2001)
- "An Army in Exile: Louis XIV and the Irish Forces of James II in France, 1691-1698" in Royal Stuart Paper, 60 (2001)
- "The Monopolisation of Military Power in France, 1515-1715" in (eds) Ronald G. Asch, Wulf Eckart Voß and Martin Wrede, Frieden und Krieg in der Frühen Neuzeit (Munich, 2001)
- "La guerre et la cour: l’ascension sociale et politique de la famille Le Tellier, 1661-1701" in A. Tartié et al., Combattre, Gouverner, Ecrire. Etudes réunies en l'honneur de Jean Chagniot (Paris, 2003)
- "The Court and the Political Culture of the French Army under Louis XIV" in European History 1477-1715: Court, Culture, Power and Diplomacy, 1 (2004)
- "The King’s Two Arms: French Amphibious Warfare in the Mediterranean under Louis XIV, 1664 to 1697" in (eds) M. Fissel and D. Trim, Amphibious Warfare and European Expansion, 1000-1700: War, Commerce and State-Formation (2005)
