= The Folklore Society =

British scholarly organisation

The Folklore Society (FLS) is a registered charity under English law based in London, England for the study of folklore. Its office is at 50 Fitzroy Street, London home of the Royal Anthropological Institute of Great Britain and Ireland.

It was founded in London in 1878 to study traditional vernacular culture, including traditional music, song, dance and drama, narrative, arts and crafts, customs and belief. The foundation was prompted by a suggestion made by Eliza Gutch in the pages of Notes and Queries.

== Members ==
William Thoms, the editor of Notes and Queries who had first introduced the term folk-lore, seems to have been instrumental in the formation of the society: as was G. L. Gomme, who was for many years a leading member.

Some prominent members were identified as the "great team" in Richard Dorson's now long-outdated 1967 history of British folkloristics, late-Victorian leaders of the surge of intellectual interest in the field, these were Andrew Lang, Edwin Sidney Hartland, Alfred Nutt, William Alexander Clouston, Edward Clodd, and Gomme. Later historians have taken a deeper interest in the pre-modern views of members such as Joseph Jacobs.

A long-serving member and steady contributor to the society's discourse and publications was Charlotte Sophia Burne, the first woman to become editor of its journal and later president (1909–10) of the society. Ethel Rudkin, the Lincolnshire folklorist, was a notable member; her publications included several articles in the journal, as well as the book Lincolnshire Folklore. Classicist Katherine Raleigh was also a member.

== Publications ==
The society publishes, in partnership with Taylor and Francis, the journal Folklore in four issues per year, and, since 1986, a newsletter, FLS News.

The journal began as The Folk-Lore Record in 1878, continued or was restarted as The Folk-Lore Journal, and from 1890 its issues were compiled as volumes with the long title Folk-Lore: A Quarterly Review of Myth, Tradition, Institution, & Custom. Incorporating The Archæological Review and The Folk-Lore Journal. Joseph Jacobs edited the first four annual volumes as the Quarterly Review, succeeded by Alfred Nutt. As the head of publisher David Nutt in the Strand, Alfred Nutt was the publisher of the journal from 1890.

Charlotte Burne edited the journal between 1899 and 1908. The editorship then passed to A. R. Wright (1909–14); William Crooke (1915–23); A. R. Wright (1924–31); E. O. James (1932–55); Christina Hole (1956–78); Jacqueline Simpson (1979–93); Gillian Bennett (1994–2004), Patricia Lysaght (2004-2012) and Jessica Hemming (2013–).

== Collections ==
The Folklore Society Library has around 15,000 books and more than 200 serial titles (40 currently received) and is held at University College London Library and Special Collections. Its major strengths are in folk narrative and English, Irish, Scottish, and Welsh folklore; there are also substantial holdings of east European folklore books, and long runs of Estonian and Basque folklore serials.

The Folklore Society Archives and Collections include folklore-related papers of G. L. Gomme and Lady Gomme, T. F. Ordish, William Crooke, Henry Underhill, Estella Canziani, Denis Galloway, Barbara Aitken, Margaret Murray, Katharine Briggs and others. The society's archives and collections are held at University College London's Special Collections.

== Presidents ==
- 1878–79 James Grimston, 2nd Earl of Verulam
- 1880–85 Frederick Lygon, 6th Earl Beauchamp
- 1885–88 George Byng, 3rd Earl of Strafford
- 1888–92 Andrew Lang
- 1892–95 Laurence Gomme
- 1895–97 Edward Clodd
- 1897–99 Alfred Nutt
- 1899–1901 Edwin Hartland
- 1901–03 Edward Brabrook
- 1903–04 Frederick York Powell
- 1904–07 W H D Rouse
- 1907–09 Moses Gaster
- 1909–11 Charlotte Burne
- 1911–13 William Crooke
- 1913–18 Robert Ranulph Marett
- 1918–20 Alfred Cort Haddon
- 1920–22 W H R Rivers
- 1922–24 Henry Balfour
- 1924–26 J L Myres
- 1926–28 A R Wright
- 1928–30 R M Dawkins
- 1930–32 E O James
- 1932–35 H J Rose
- 1935–37 S H Hooke
- 1937–39 Mary MacLeod Banks
- 1939–43 John Henry Hutton
- 1943–45 L F Newman
- 1945–47 FitzRoy Somerset, 4th Baron Raglan
- 1947–48 H J Fleure
- 1948–51 Walter Leo Hildburgh
- 1951–53 Arthur Allan Gomme
- 1953–55 Margaret Murray
- 1955 T W Bagshawe
- 1956 (No president)
- 1956–59 Sona Rosa Burstein
- 1959–61 Sir Arthur Waugh
- 1961–63 Mary Williams
- 1963–64 Peter Opie
- 1964–67 Douglas Kennedy
- 1967–70 Katharine Briggs
- 1970–73 Stewart Sanderson
- 1973–76 Hilda Ellis Davidson
- 1976–79 J R Porter
- 1979–82 W M S Russell
- 1982–84 Carmen Blacker
- 1984–87 Venetia Newall
- 1987–90 John Widdowson
- 1990–93 Roy Judge
- 1993–96 Jacqueline Simpson
- 1996–99 Juliette Wood
- 1999–2002 W. F. H. Nicolaisen
- 2002–05 Marion Bowman
- 2005–08 W. F. Ryan
- 2008–11 Eddie Cass
- 2011–14 Robert McDowall
- 2014–17 James H. Grayson
- 2017–20 Patricia Lysaght
- 2020–23 Owen Davies
- 2023-2026 David Hopkin
- 2026- Jeremy Harte

== Katharine Briggs Award ==
The Katharine Briggs Award is an annual book prize awarded by the Society in honour of Katharine Mary Briggs (who was the society's president from 1969 to 1972). The prize has been awarded every year since it was first announced in 1982. Notable winners include Israeli historian of social memory Guy Beiner (2019), American scholar of fairy tales Jack Zipes (2007), English mythographer Marina Warner (1999), British radical historian E. P. Thompson (1992), English married team of folklorists Iona and Peter Opie (1986) and Soviet folklorist Vladimir Propp (1985).

Winners of the award are:

- 1982: Samuel Pyeatt Menefee, Wives for Sale: an Ethnographic Study of British Popular Divorce (Basil Blackwell)
- 1983: Michael Pickering, Village Song and Culture (Croom Helm)
- 1984: Sandra Billington, A Social History of the Fool (Harvester Press)
- 1985: Vladimir Propp, Theory and History of Folklore, edited by Anatoly Liberman (Manchester University Press)
- 1986: Iona and Peter Opie, The Singing Game (Oxford University Press)
- 1987: Amy Shuman, Storytelling Rights (Cambridge University Press)
- 1988: Hilda Ellis Davidson, Myths and Symbols in Pagan Europe (Manchester University Press)
- 1989: J. P. Mallory, In Search of the Indo-Europeans Language, Archaeology and Myth (Thames & Hudson)
- 1990: Paul Oliver, Blues Fell This Morning (Cambridge University Press)
- 1991: Simon Charsley, Rites of Marrying: The Wedding Industry in Scotland (Manchester University Press)
- 1992: E. P. Thompson, Customs in Common (Merlin Press)
- 1993: Georgina Boyes, The Imagined Village: Culture, Ideology, and the English Folk Revival (Manchester University Press)
- 1994: Claudia Kinmonth, Irish Country Furniture 1700-1950 (Yale University Press)
- 1995: Timothy Mitchell, Flamenco Deep Song (Yale University Press)
- 1996: Mary-Ann Constantine, Breton Ballads (CMCS Publications)
- 1997: Neil Jarman, Parading Culture: Parades and Visual Displays in Northern Ireland (Berg)
- 1998: Joseph Falaky Nagy, Conversing with Angels and Ancients: The Literary Myths of Medieval Ireland (Four Courts)
- 1999: Marina Warner, No Go the Bogeyman: Scaring, Lulling and Making Mock (Chatto and Windus)
- 2000: Diarmuid Ó Giolláin, Locating Irish Folklore: Tradition, Modernity, Identity (Cork University Press)
- 2001: Adam Fox, Oral and Literate Culture in England, 1500-1700 (Clarendon Press)
- 2002: Elizabeth Hallam and Jenny Hockey, Death, Memory and Material Culture (Berg)
- 2003: Malcolm Jones, The Secret Middle Ages (Sutton)
- 2004: Steve Roud, The Penguin Guide to the Superstitions of Britain and Ireland (Penguin)
- 2005: Jeremy Harte, Explore Fairy Traditions (Heart of Albion Press)
- 2006: Catherine Rider, Magic and Impotence in the Middle Ages (Oxford University Press)
- 2007: Jack Zipes, Why Fairy Tales Stick (Routledge)
- 2008: Richard Bebb, Welsh Furniture 1250-1950: a Cultural History of Craftsmanship and Design (Saer Books)
- 2009: Kathryn Marsh, The Musical Playground: Global Tradition and Change in Children's Songs and Games (Oxford University Press)
- 2010: Arthur Taylor, Played at the Pub: the Pub Games of Britain (English Heritage Publications)
- 2011: Herbert Halpert, edited by John Widdowson, Folk Tales, Trickster Tales and Legends of the Supernatural from the Pinelands of New Jersey (Edwin Mellen Press)
- 2012: David Hopkin, Voices of the People in Nineteenth-Century France (Cambridge University Press)
- 2013: Karl Bell, The Legend of Spring-Heeled Jack: Victorian Urban Folklore and Popular Cultures (Boydell Press)
- 2014: David Atkinson, The Anglo-Scottish Ballad and its Imaginary Contexts (OpenBook Publishers)
- 2015: Richard Jenkins, Black Magic and Bogeymen (Cork University Press)
- 2016: Lizanne Henderson, Witchcraft and Folk Belief in the Age of Enlightenment: Scotland, 1670-1740 (Palgrave)
- 2017: Christopher Josiffe, Gef! The Strange Tale of an Extra-Special Talking Mongoose (Strange Attractor)
- 2018: Martin Graebe, As I Walked Out: Sabine Baring Gould and the Search for the Folk Songs of Devon and Cornwall (Signal Books)
- 2019: Guy Beiner, Forgetful Remembrance: Social Forgetting and Vernacular Historiography of a Rebellion in Ulster (Oxford University Press)
- 2020: William G. Pooley, Body and Tradition in Nineteenth-Century France: Félix Arnaudin and the Moorlands of Gascony, 1870-1914 (Oxford University Press)
- 2021: Jonathan Y. H. Hui (ed. and trans.), Vilmundar saga viðutan. The Saga of Vilmundur the Outsider (Viking Society for Northern Research)
- 2022: Marina Montesano (ed.) Folklore, Magic, and Witchcraft: Cultural Exchanges from the Twelfth to Eighteenth Century (Routledge)
- 2023: Una McIlvenna, Singing the News of Death: Execution Ballads in Europe 1500-1900 (Oxford University Press)
- 2024: Tabitha Stanmore, Cunning Folk: Life in the Era of Practical Magic (The Bodley Head).
- 2025: Ann Schmiesing, The Brothers Grimm: A Biography (Yale University Press)
- 2026: Christopher Bader, Joseph O. Baker, and Tom Clark, Paranormal Britain: Belief in the Uncanny in England, Scotland, and Wales (Bloomsbury Publishing)

== Coote Lake Medal ==
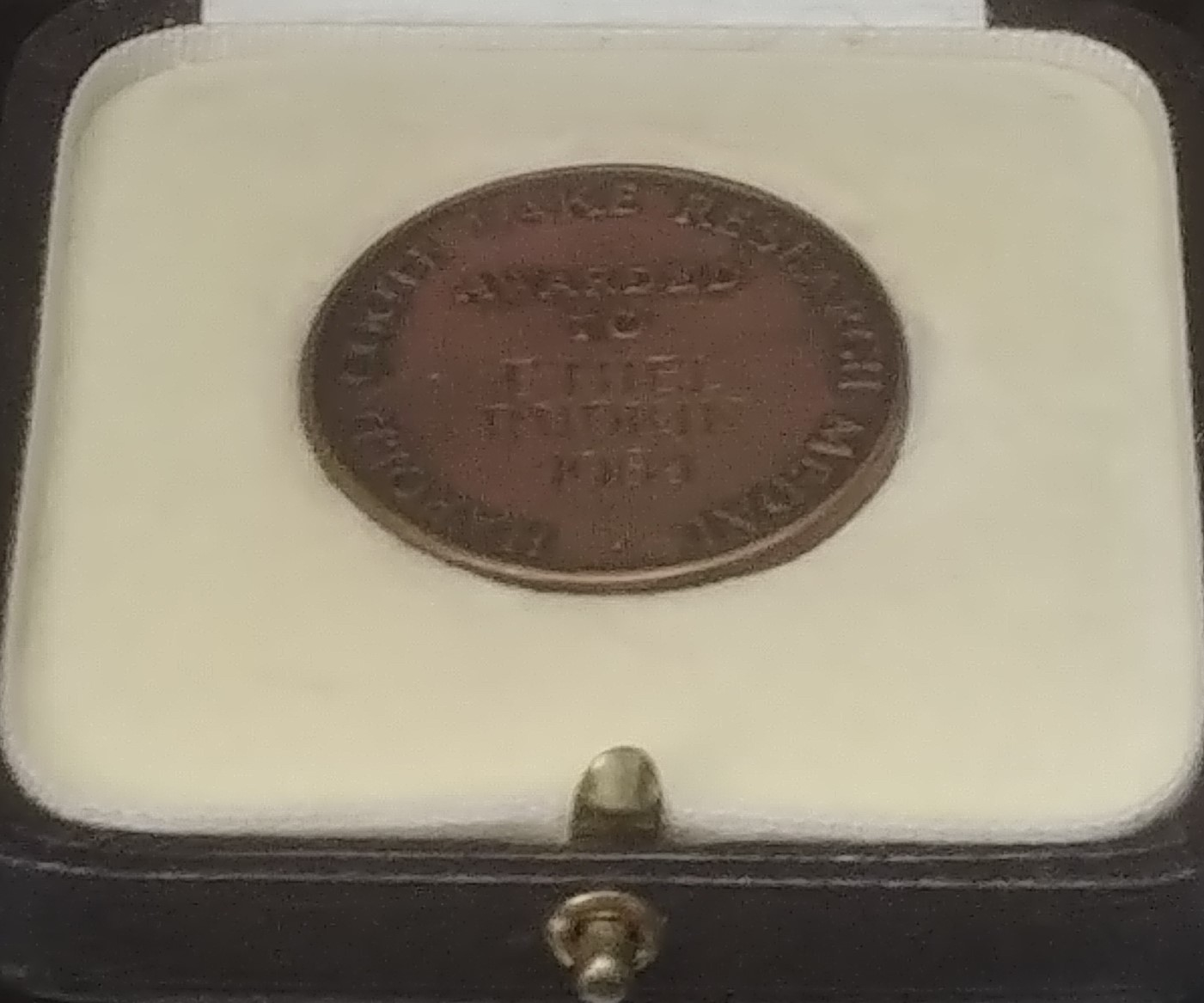
Coote Lake Medal awarded to Ethel Rudkin (North Lincolnshire Museum)

The Coote Lake medal is awarded by the Committee of the Folklore Society for "outstanding research and scholarship" in the field of Folklore Studies.

The award is named in honour of Harold Coote Lake (1878-1939), an active member of the Folklore Society in the 1920s and 1930s (who served as both Treasurer and Secretary of the Society at points in that period).

The recipients have been:

- 1940 Mary MacLeod Banks
- 1941 Dr T. E. Lones
- 1952 Dr Walter Leo Hildburgh
- 1955 Professor Edward Oliver James
- 1960 Iona and Peter Opie
- 1968 Alex Helm and Enid Porter
- 1979 Christina Hole
- 1983 Theo Brown and Stewart Sanderson
- 1984 Ethel Rudkin and Dr Hilda Davidson
- 1987 Dr Emily Lyle and Dr Ian Russell
- 2000 Professor John Widdowson and Dr Roy Judge
- 2006 Dr Venetia Newall
- 2007 Dr Jaqueline Simpson and Dr 'Doc' Rowe
- 2008 Jennifer Westwood
- 2013 Professor Patricia Lysaght
- 2014 Malcolm Taylor and Dr Eddie Cass
- 2018 Dr Gillian Bennett and Dr Caroline Oates
- 2024 Steve Roud and Professor Ronald Hutton
