= Steve Roud =

British historian of folklore (born 1949)

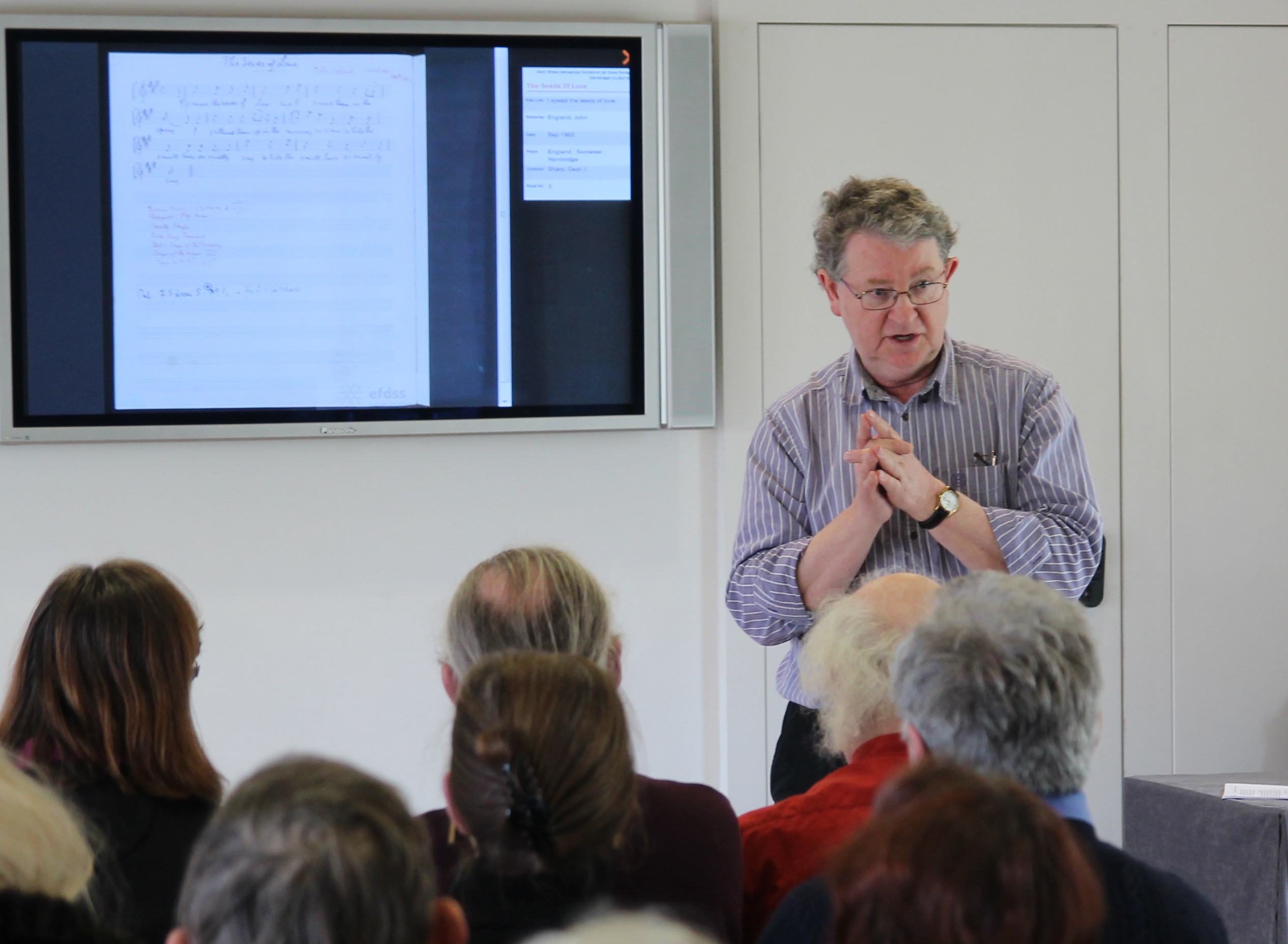
- Roud at Clare College, Cambridge in 2014
- Born: 1949 (age 76–77); Streatham, London, England

Steve Roud (/raʊd/; born 1949) is the creator of the Roud Folk Song Index and an expert on folklore and superstition. He was formerly Local Studies Librarian for the London Borough of Croydon and Honorary Librarian of the Folklore Society.

== Life and career ==
=== Roud Folk Song Index ===
The Roud Folk Song Index is a database of over 240,000 references to nearly 25,000 songs collected from oral tradition in the English language from all over the world. It began in around 1970 as a personal project, listing the source singer (if known), their locality, the date of noting the song, the publisher (book or recorded source), plus other fields, and crucially assigning a number to each song, including all variants (now known as the 'Roud number'). The system initially used 3x5-inch filing cards in shoeboxes. In 1993, Roud implemented his record system on a computer database, which he continues to expand and maintain and which is now hosted on the website of the Vaughan Williams Memorial Library.

As of 2011, the numbers have become increasingly adopted in academic circles.

=== Writings ===
Since 2000, Roud has written a range of volumes on folklore, calendar customs and folk music. A number of these have met with substantial acclaim; 2003's The Penguin Guide to the Superstitions of Britain and Ireland was awarded the Folklore Society's prestigious Katharine Briggs Award for the outstanding folklore-related book of the year. 2006's The English Year, which summarises the calendar customs of the British ritual year, was hailed by The Independent as "a rich and wonderful compendium." The Lore of the Playground, Roud's 2010 exploration of the way children's games evolve and transmit through an oral tradition, was praised in publications including The Spectator and The Yorkshire Post, with The Sunday Times describing it as "a delightful compendium".

Roud's later works on folk music, which build upon the deep research embodied in the Roud Index, have also met with strong reviews. The Daily Telegraph called 2012's The New Penguin Book of English Folk Songs (co-edited with music specialist Julia Bishop) "(a)n impressive and nourishing book, with an appeal far beyond the folk aficionado", with similar praise coming from The Times, Record Collector and The Independent. Writing in The Guardian, Kathryn Hughes described Folk Song in England (2017) as a "monumental history of the English folk song".

=== Awards ===
In 2004, Roud was the winner of the Folklore Society's Katharine Briggs Folklore Award for The Penguin Guide to the Superstitions of Britain and Ireland.

In 2009, Roud was one of five people to be awarded the Gold Badge of the English Folk Dance and Song Society. This award recognises "those who have made unique or outstanding contributions to the art or science of folk dance, music or song, and/or those who have given exceptional support in furthering the aims of the Society".

In 2014, Roud was given the Walford Award by the Chartered Institute of Library and Information Professionals' Information Services Group. His 2012 book with Julia Bishop, The New Penguin Book of English Folk Songs, had won the Reference Award the previous year.

=== Personal life ===
Roud lives and works with his wife in Somersham, Cambridgeshire, England.

== Books ==
- (with Jacqueline Simpson) A Dictionary of English Folklore. Oxford: Oxford University Press. 2000. ISBN 019210019X.
- (with Eddie Cass) Room, Room, Ladies and Gentlemen: an introduction to the English Mummers' play. London: English Folk Dance and Song Society/Folklore Society. 2002. ISBN 9780854181858.
- The Penguin Guide to the Superstitions of Britain and Ireland. London: Penguin. 2003. ISBN 0141006730.
- A Pocket Guide to Superstitions of the British Isles. London: Penguin. 2004. ISBN 9780140515497. OCLC 59266481.
- The English Year: a month-by-month guide to the nation's customs and festivals, from May Day to Mischief Night. London: Penguin. 2006. ISBN 9780140515541.
- London Lore: the legends and traditions of the world's most vibrant city. London: Random House. 2008. ISBN 9781847945112.
- Monday's Child is Fair of Face: ... and other traditional beliefs about babies and motherhood. London: Random House. 2008. ISBN 9781905211524.
- The Lore of the Playground : one hundred years of children's games, rhymes and traditions. London: Random House. 2010. ISBN 9781905211517.
- (with Julia Bishop) The New Penguin Book of English Folk Songs. London: Penguin Classics. 2012. ISBN 9780141194615.
- (with David Atkinson) Street ballads in nineteenth-century Britain, Ireland, and North America : the interface between print and oral traditions. London: Routledge. 2016. ISBN 978-1-315-61104-4. OCLC 950004851.
- Folksong in England. London: Faber. 2017. ISBN 9780571309719. OCLC 920720540.
- (with David Atkinson) Street Literature of the Long Nineteenth Century. Newcastle: Cambridge Scholars Publishing. 2017. ISBN 9781443894999.
