= James H. Grayson =

British Koreanist (born 1944)

James Huntley Grayson (born 1944) is a scholar of the religions and folklore of Korea. He is Emeritus Professor of Modern Korean Studies in the School of East Asian Studies at The University of Sheffield. He also has the Korean name Kim Chŏnghyŏn (Korean: 김정현; Hanja: 金正玄) and published some articles under this name as well.

== Education ==
Grayson earned a BA in Anthropology from Rutgers University (1962–66), an MA in Anthropology from Columbia University (1966–68), an MDiv in Systematic Theology from Duke University (1968–71), and a PhD in the History of Religion from University of Edinburgh (1976–79).

== Career ==
Grayson served as a missionary of the United Methodist Church (USA) to South Korea between 1971 and 1987. During this time he taught religion at Kyungpook National University and Keimyung University.

In 1987 he moved to the University of Sheffield, where at the School of East Asian Studies, he taught Korean history and culture, and East Asian philosophy and religion. as first Lecturer, then Senior Lecturer, Reader and finally Professor. He retired in 2009.

Grayson's research has focused on topics such as traditional Korean religion, Korean Christianity and Korean oral folklore and has been summarised as being focused on both "the diffusion of religion across cultural boundaries, and an analysis of the religious and intellectual conceptual framework of the Korean and East Asian peoples". His research is informed by his anthropological training and has been aided by fieldwork in Korea, Japan, and Okinawa.

A collection of Grayson's research notes and correspondence, from the time he spent in East Asia, is kept in the Special Collections of the University Library, University of Sheffield.

Grayson is also known for strongly supporting the McCune–Reischauer romanization system and disapproving of Revised Romanization of Korean.

== Recognition ==
Grayson has served as President of the British Association for Korean Studies (BAKS), and Vice-President of the Association for Korean Studies in Europe (AKSE).

Grayson was also President of The Folklore Society from to 2014 to 2017.

== Selected publications ==
- Grayson, James H. (1985). Early Buddhism and Christianity in Korea: a Study in the Emplantation of Religion. Boston: BRILL. ISBN 978-90-04-37866-7. OCLC 1111949448.
- Grayson, James H. (1994-07-01). "Ideology, religion, and the roots of nationalism: Two case studies of revitalization in late Koryo and Late Choson times". Religion. 24 (3): 235–251. doi:10.1006/reli.1994.1021. ISSN 0048-721X.
- Grayson, James H. (2001). Myths and legends from Korea: an annotated compendium of ancient and modern materials. London: Routledge. ISBN 978-0-203-35838-2. OCLC 847599502.
- Grayson, James H. (2002). Korea: a religious history (Revised edition ed.). New York. ISBN 978-1-136-86918-1. OCLC 863157386.
- Grayson, James H. (2002-01-01). "Susa-no-o: a culture hero from Korea". Japan Forum. 14 (3): 465–487. doi:10.1080/0955580022000008718. ISSN 0955-5803.
- Grayson, James H. and Park, Chang-Won (2010). "An Interview with Professor James H. Grayson". Journal of Korean Religions. 1 (1–2): 189–197. doi:10.1353/jkr.2010.0008. ISSN 2167-2040.
- Grayson, James H. (2011-07-01). "The Empire of Mt. Sion: A Korean Millenarian Group Born in a Time of Crisis". Transformation. 28 (3): 161–171. doi:10.1177/0265378811404772. ISSN 0265-3788.
- Grayson, James H. (2015-09-02). "Tan'gun and Chumong: The Politics of Korean Foundation Myths". Folklore. 126 (3): 253–265. doi:10.1080/0015587X.2015.1093391. ISSN 0015-587X.
- Grayson, James H. (2017-01-02). "Invading Mongols and the Preservation of Korean Traditions: The Monk Iryŏn and the Memorabilia of the Three Kingdoms". Folklore. 128 (1): 1–15. doi:10.1080/0015587X.2016.1224147. ISSN 0015-587X.
- Grayson, James H. (2018-01-02). "Son Chint'ae and the Foundations of Modern Korean Folklore Studies". Folklore. 129 (1): 1–17. doi:10.1080/0015587X.2017.1388020. ISSN 0015-587X.
