= Patricia Lysaght =

Irish folklorist

Patricia Lysaght (born 1948) is an Irish folklorist. She is Professor Emerita of European Ethnology, University College Dublin, Ireland.

== Education ==
Lysaght was born in County Clare. Lysaght's academic background was firstly in Law, before qualifications in Irish Language and Literature, and Irish and European Folklore and Ethnology. She completed her PhD at the National University of Ireland in 1982.

== Career ==
Published in 1985, Lysaght's book The banshee: a study in beliefs and legends about the Irish supernatural death-messenger was based on her PhD thesis. It was hailed by one reviewer "as an outstanding achievement in Irish and international folklore studies".

Over her career, Lysaght has authored and edited ten books and over one hundred research articles. Her research has focused around the supernatural folklore of Ireland and on food and foodways. She is the current Chair of the International Society for Ethnology and Folklore's Working Group on Food Research.

Lysaght has also served as Editor of both Folklore (Journal of the Folklore Society, London) and Béaloideas (Journal of The Folklore of Ireland Society, Dublin).

== Recognition ==
Lysaght has been awarded scholarships and guest professorships at a number of international universities and institutes, such as Westfälische Wilhelms-Universität, Münster, and the Russian Academy of Sciences, Moscow.

Lysaght was elected to the Royal Irish Academy in 2006. She is also an elected member of the Royal Gustavus Adolphus Academy for Swedish Folk Culture, who, In 2013, awarded her the Torsten Janckes minnesfond prize for her "outstanding contribution to folkloristic and ethnological scholarship". In 2013 Lysaght was also awarded the Coote Lake Medal of the Folklore Society, "for outstanding research and scholarship".

Lysaght served as President of the Folklore Society from 2017 to 2020. Her Presidential Lectures were on topics relating to the collection of Irish folklore: the contribution of Robin Flower, a comparison of the Folklore of Ireland Society and the Irish Folklore Commission and the work of the artist Simon Colman for the Irish Folklore Commission.

== Select publications ==
- Lysaght, Patricia (1985). The banshee: a study in beliefs and legends about the Irish supernatural death-messenger. Dun Laoghaire: Glendale. ISBN 978-0-907606-29-1. OCLC \469534540.
- Lysaght, Patricia (editor) (1994). Milk and milk products from medieval to modern times: proceedings of the Ninth International Conference on Ethnological Food Research, Ireland, 1992. Edinburgh: Published by Canongate Academic in association with the Dept. of Irish Folklore, University College Dublin and the European Ethnological Research Centre, Edinburgh. ISBN 978-1-898410-12-6. OCLC1157750852.
- Lysaght, Patricia (1995). "Traditional Beliefs and Narratives of a Contemporary Irish Tradition Bearer" in Folk belief today. Mare Kõiva, Kai Vassiljeva (editors), Eesti Keele Instituut, Fr. R. Kreutzwaldi nimeline Kirjandusmuuseum. Tartu: Estonian Academy of Sciences, Institute of the Estonian Language & Estonian Museum of Literature. 1995. ISBN 9985-851-11-0. OCLC 34287090.
- Lysaght, Patricia; Ó Catháin, Séamas; Ó hÓgáin, Dáithí (editors). (1999). Islanders and water-dwellers: proceedings of the Celtic-Nordic-Baltic Folklore Symposium held at University College Dublin, 16–19 June 1996. Dublin: DBA Publications Ltd. ISBN 978-0-9519692-7-4. OCLC 43395588.
- Lysaght, Patricia (1997-01-01). "Caoineadh os Cionn Coirp: The Lament for the Dead in Ireland". Folklore. 108 (1–2): 65–82. doi:10.1080/0015587X.1997.9715938. ISSN 0015-587X.
- Lysaght, Patricia (1998). "Seán Ó Súilleabháin (1903-1996) and the Irish Folklore Commission". Western Folklore. 57 (2/3): 137–151. doi:10.2307/1500217. ISSN 0043-373X.
- Lysaght, Patricia (1998). A pocket book of the banshee. Dublin; Boulder, Colo.: O'Brien Press; Irish American Book Co. ISBN 978-0-86278-501-7. OCLC 39451498.
- Lysaght, Patricia (2003). "Hospitality at wakes and funerals in Ireland from the seventeenth to the nineteenth century: Some evidence from the written record". Folklore. 114 (3): 403–426. doi:10.1080/0015587032000145405. ISSN 0015-587X.
- Lysaght, Patricia (2017-07-03). "From the British Museum to the Great Blasket: Robin Flower and the Western Island". Folklore. 128 (3): 219–243. doi:10.1080/0015587X.2017.1336002. ISSN 0015-587X.
- Lysaght, Patricia (2019-01-02). "From 'Collect the Fragments …' to 'Memory of the World'—Collecting the Folklore of Ireland 1927–70: Aims, Achievement, Legacy". Folklore. 130 (1): 1–30. doi:10.1080/0015587X.2018.1553333. ISSN 0015-587X.
- Lysaght, Patricia (2020-01-02). "An Artist on Inis Oírr and Inis Meáin: Simon Coleman's Visit to the Aran Islands in 1959 on Behalf of the Irish Folklore Commission". Folklore. 131 (1): 1–33. doi:10.1080/0015587X.2019.1658380. ISSN 0015-587X.
- Lysaght, Patricia (2021-01-02). "Collecting the Folklore of Ireland: The Schoolchildren's Contribution". Folklore. 132 (1): 1–33. doi:10.1080/0015587X.2020.1841461. ISSN 0015-587X.
