= The Society for Folk Life Studies =

The Society for Folk Life Studies is a British organization which fosters interdisciplinary studies of regional cultures and traditions, concentrating mainly but not exclusively on the British Isles. The society is part of the wider folklore studies community.

The society was formed in 1961, based in part on pre-war Scandinavian folk studies models, and fostered by discussion in a late-1950s journal, Gwerin. It has a membership of about 500 individuals and organisations, mainly drawn from museum professionals. The society organises conferences, study days, and has since 1963 published an annual journal, Folk Life. The work of the society tends towards rigorous descriptive scholarship mainly concerned with physical aspects of traditional societies.
