= E. O. James =

British anthropologist (1888-1972)

Edwin Oliver James (30 March 1888 – 6 July 1972) was an anthropologist in the field of comparative religion. He was Professor Emeritus of the History and Philosophy of Religion in the University of London, Fellow of University College London and Fellow of King's College London. During his long career he had been Professor of History and Philosophy of Religion at the University of Leeds, Lecturer at the University of Amsterdam and Wilde Lecturer at the University of Oxford.

James received his education at Exeter College, Oxford and at University College London, where he studied under the noted egyptologist Sir William Matthew Flinders Petrie.

James was also a member of the Folklore Society, serving as its president from 1930 to 1932.

== Works ==
- Evolution and the Fall (1923)
- The Beginnings of Man (1928)
- The Christian Faith in the Modern World. A Study in Scientific Theology.
- A History of Christianity in England
- Christian Myth And Ritual: A Historical Study (1933)
- Origins of Sacrifice: A Study in Comparative Religion (1933)
- Thieves of Mercy (1934) poems
- The Old Testament in the Light of Anthropology (1935)
- The Origins of Religion (1937)
- Comparative Religion: An Introductory and Historical Study (1938)
- Primitive Belief and Ritual
- The Social Function of Religion (1948)
- The Concept of Deity. The Wilde Lectures (1950)
- Marriage and Society (1952)
- History of Religions (1956)
- Prehistoric Religion: A Study in Prehistoric Archaeology (1957)
- Myths and Ritual in the Ancient Near East (1958)
- The Beginnings of Religion: An Introductory & Scientific Study (1958)
- The Cult of the Mother Goddess: An Archaeological and Documentary Study (1959)
- The Comparative Study of Religions of the East (Excluding Christianity and Judaism).
- The Ancient Gods: The History and Diffusion of Religion in the Ancient Near East and the Eastern Mediterranean (1960)
- Nature and Function of Priesthood: A Comparative and Anthropological Study (1961)
- Seasonal Feasts and Festivals (1961)
- Sacrifice and Sacrament (1962)
- The Worship of the Sky-God, A Comparative Study in Semitic and Indo-European Religion (1963)
- Marriage Customs Through the Ages (1965)
- From Cave to Cathedral : Temples and Shrines of Prehistoric, Classical and Early Christian Times (1965)
- The Tree of Life: An Archaeological Study (1966)
- Christianity and other religions (1968)
- Creation and Cosmology: a historical and comparative inquiry (1969)
