= Roy Porter (priest) =

The Reverend Canon Roy Porter
- Born: Joshua Roy Porter; 7 May 1921; Macclesfield, Cheshire, England
- Died: 31 December 2006 (aged 85)

Academic background
- Education: Merton College, Oxford; St Stephen's House, Oxford

Academic work
- Discipline: Theologian
- Sub-discipline: Old Testament studies
- Institutions: Oriel College, Oxford; University of Exeter

Joshua Roy Porter (7 May 1921 – 31 December 2006) was a British Anglican priest, theologian and author. Having been chaplain and fellow of Oriel College, Oxford, from 1949 to 1962, he was Professor of Theology at the University of Exeter from 1962 to 1986.

== Early life and education ==
Porter was born on 7 May 1921 in Macclesfield, Cheshire, to Joshua Porter and Bessie Evelyn (nee Earlam). He attended King's School, Macclesfield, before studying at Merton College, Oxford, where he graduated with a double first in Modern History and Theology in 1942.

== Career ==
=== Church of England ===
Porter trained for ordained ministry at St Stephen's House, Oxford. He was ordained in the Church of England as a deacon in 1945 and as a priest in 1946. He went on to become curate at St Mary's Church, Portsea between 1945 and 1947. He was resident chaplain to the Bishop of Chichester (George Bell) from 1947 to 1949: he would then be honorary chaplain from 1949 to 1950, and an examining chaplain from 1950 to 2002.

Porter served as a member of the General Synod of the Church of England from 1970 to 1990. A conservative thinker, he opposed liberalising changes to the Church of England (such as the ordination of women), often working in tandem with fellow Exonian Margaret Hewitt.

=== Academic career ===
In 1949 Porter returned to Oxford, to Oriel College, where for the next thirteen years he held positions as Fellow, Chaplain and lecturer. In 1962 Porter joined the University of Exeter, to the newly created Chair of Theology. Porter served as Professor until 1986 (and also as Dean of Arts from 1968 to 1971). As a scholar, Porter’s focus was the Old Testament.

Porter also had an interest in folklore and served as President of the Folklore Society from 1976 to 1979. His three Presidential addresses were titled, 'Two Presidents of the Folklore Society: S. H. Hooke and E. O. James' (1977), “The Daughters of Lot' (1978), and 'Folklore Between the Testaments' (1979)

== Selected works ==
- Porter, J. R. (1963). Moses and monarchy: a study in the Biblical tradition of Moses. Inaugural lecture of the Chair of Theology in the University of Exeter delivered on 26 February 1963. Oxford: Blackwell. OCLC 1152653198.
- Porter, J. R. (1976).The Book of Leviticus. Cambridge: Cambridge University Press. ISBN 978-0-521-09773-4. OCLC 59166428.
- Porter, J. R. (1999) Jesus Christ: The Jesus of History, the Christ of Faith. New York: Oxford University Press. ISBN 978-0-19-521429-1. OCLC 232163064.
- Porter, J. R. (2001) The Lost Bible: forgotten scriptures revealed. Chicago: University of Chicago Press. ISBN 978-0-226-67579-4
- Porter, J. R. (2003) The new illustrated companion to the Bible: Old Testament, New Testament, the life of Jesus, early Christianity, Jesus in art. London: Duncan Baird.ISBN 978-1-904292-68-5. OCLC 52784359.
- Service delivered by Porter at the Southeastern Baptist Theological Seminary in 1964.
