= Stewart Sanderson =

Folklorist and linguist

Stewart Forson Sanderson (1924–2016) was a Scottish folklorist and linguist.

== Early life ==
Sanderson was born in Blantyre, Malawi (then Nyasaland) in 1924. He returned to Scotland for schooling at Madras College, St Andrews and George Watson’s College in Edinburgh.

From 1943-46 he served in the Royal Navy Volunteer Reserve, initially as a sub-lieutenant, in the Mediterranean. Following the end of the Second World War, he resumed his studies graduating at the University of Edinburgh in 1951 with a 1st class honours MA in English Language and Literature.

== Career ==
Upon graduation, Sanderson travelled to Italy on scholarships, but he returned to Edinburgh in 1952 to take up a position as Secretary-Archivist at the newly established School of Scottish Studies.

Sanderson's work at the School was amidst a period of intense collecting of oral history, folk music and folk song and his work was key to establishing the School’s collecting policies and regulations. Stewart’s own research included studies of oral traditions of gypsies, material culture, fishing communities and folk beliefs, and he participated in field collection when possible.

In 1957 he became a Senior Research Fellow at the School and in the same year, became an Assistant Editor of the newly founded journal Scottish Studies.

Moving to Leeds University in 1960 as a Lecturer in Folk Life Studies within the School of English, Stewart became Director of the newly created Institute of Dialect and Folklife Studies in 1964. There, he established both undergraduate and postgraduate programmes in Folk Life Studies - the first such courses in a UK university.

At Leeds University, a linguistic survey of England had been begun by Harold Orton in 1950. In 1968, Sanderson agreed to co-edit with Orton a linguistic atlas based on the English survey, which was seen as the culmination of the project. This work, edited by Orton, Sanderson and John Widdowson, was finally published as The Linguistic Atlas of England (1978, with Harold Orton and Prof John Widdowson). Further publications from the project edited by Sanderson followed, including Studies in Linguistic Geography (1985) with Widdowson and John M Kirk and Word Maps: A Dialect Atlas of England (1987) with Widdowson and Clive Upton.

Sanderson was also chairman of the School of English in Leeds from 1980-1983. During this time he arranged the transfer the archives of the Institute of Dialect and Folklife Studies for preservation in the special collections of the Brotherton Library, at the University of Leeds. The Institute closed as a result of budget cuts in 1983.

== Recognition and later years ==
Sanderson was a Trustee of the Folklore Society from 1968-1979 and served as its President from 1970-1973. In 1981 he gave the Society’s inaugural Katharine Briggs Lecture on ‘The Modern Urban Legend’ and was awarded the Society’s Coote-Lake Research Medal in 1982.

Sanderson was a member of the committees of the International Commission for the Atlas of European Folk Culture and the International Society for Folk Narrative Research. He was a governor of the British Institute for Recorded Sound from 1979-1983.

After retirement from academia, Sanderson remained active in Scottish literature circles. From 1983 to 1988 he chaired the Scottish Arts Council literature panel and also its grants to publishers panel, during a period which saw a significant revival of literature in Scotland.

== Selected works ==
- Orton, Harold; Sanderson, Stewart; Widdowson, J. D. A (1977). The Linguistic atlas of England. London; Atlantic Highlands, N.J.: Croom Helm; Humanities Press. ISBN 978-0-391-00759-8. OCLC 5029407.
- Kirk, John M; Sanderson, Stewart; Widdowson, J. D. A (1985). Studies in linguistic geography: the dialects of English in Britain and Ireland. London: Croom Helm. OCLC 874511439.
- Upton, Clive; Sanderson, Stewart; Widdowson, John (1987). Word maps: a dialect atlas of England. London: Croom Helm. ISBN 978-0-7099-5409-5. OCLC 1014618497.
