= Jacqueline Simpson =

British researcher and author on folklore

Jacqueline Simpson (born 1930) is a British researcher and author on folklore.

== Career ==
Simpson studied English Literature and Medieval Icelandic at Bedford College, University of London. She has been, at various times, Editor, Secretary, and President of the Folklore Society. She was awarded the Society's Coote Lake Research Medal in 2008. In 2010, she was appointed visiting professor of folklore at the Sussex Centre of Folklore, Fairy Tales and Fantasy at the University of Chichester, West Sussex. She has a particular interest in local legends (as opposed to international fairy tales), and has published collections of this genre from Iceland, Scandinavia in general, and England (the latter in collaboration with the late Jennifer Westwood). She has also written on the folklore of various English regions, and was co-author with Steve Roud of the Penguin Dictionary of English Folklore.

She has been a point of reference for Terry Pratchett since he met her at a book signing in 1997. Pratchett, who was then researching his novel Carpe Jugulum, was asking everyone in the queue how many "magpie" rhymes they knew; and while most people gave one answer – the theme from the TV series Magpie – Simpson was able to supply considerably more. According to Pratchett's version of their conversation, there were "about nineteen", but she suspects this is creative embroidery. Their encounter eventually led to collaboration.

== Personal life ==
Simpson lives in West Sussex, England.

== Selected publications ==
=== Articles ===
- Simpson, Jacqueline (1966-03-01). "Otherworld Adventures in an Icelandic Saga". Folklore. 77 (1): 1–20. doi:10.1080/0015587X.1966.9717025. ISSN 0015-587X.
- Simpson, Jacqueline (1967-09-01). "Some Scandinavian Sacrifices". Folklore. 78 (3): 190–202. doi:10.1080/0015587X.1967.9717093. ISSN 0015-587X.
- Simpson, Jacqueline (1969-06-01). "Legends of Chanctonbury Ring". Folklore. 80 (2): 122–131. doi:10.1080/0015587X.1969.9716625. ISSN 0015-587X.
- Simpson, Jacqueline (1973-09-01). "Sussex Local Legends". Folklore. 84 (3): 206–223. doi:10.1080/0015587X.1973.9716515. ISSN 0015-587X.
- Simpson, Jacqueline (1974-03-01). "The Function of Folklore in 'Jane Eyre' and 'Wuthering Heights'". Folklore. 85 (1): 47–61. doi:10.1080/0015587X.1974.9716534. ISSN 0015-587X.
- Simpson, Jacqueline (1975-09-01). "Nixon's Prophecies in Their Historical Setting". Folklore. 86 (3–4): 201–207. doi:10.1080/0015587X.1975.9716023. ISSN 0015-587X.
- Simpson, Jacqueline (1978-01-01). "Fifty British Dragon Tales: An Analysis". Folklore. 89 (1): 79–93. doi:10.1080/0015587X.1978.9716092. ISSN 0015-587X.
- Simpson, Jacqueline (1979-01-01). "'Wændel' and the Long Man of Wilmington". Folklore. 90 (1): 25–28. doi:10.1080/0015587X.1979.9716120. ISSN 0015-587X.
- Simpson, Jacqueline (1981-01-01). "Rationalized Motifs in Urban Legends". Folklore. 92 (2): 203–207. doi:10.1080/0015587X.1981.9716207. ISSN 0015-587X.
- Simpson, Jacqueline (1982-01-01). "Obituary: Peter Mason Opie, M.A. (1918–1982)". Folklore. 93 (2): 223–223. doi:10.1080/0015587X.1982.9716243. ISSN 0015-587X.
- Simpson, Jacqueline (1983-01-01). "Obituary: Professor William R. Bascom (1912–1981)". Folklore. 94 (2): 251–251. doi:10.1080/0015587X.1983.9716285. ISSN 0015-587X.
- Simpson, Jacqueline (1985-01-01). "Obituary: Georges Henri Rivière, 1897–1985". Folklore. 96 (2): 255–255. doi:10.1080/0015587X.1985.9716357. ISSN 0015-587X.
- Simpson, Jacqueline (1986-01-01). "God's visible judgements: the Christian dimension of landscape legends". Landscape History. 8 (1): 53–58. doi:10.1080/01433768.1986.10594397. ISSN 0143-3768.
- Simpson, Jacqueline (1989-01-01). "Folklore in Folklore: Trends Since 1959". Folklore. 100 (1): 3–8. doi:10.1080/0015587X.1989.9715746. ISSN 0015-587X.
- Simpson, Jacqueline (1991-01-01). "'Be Bold, but not Too Bold': Female Courage in Some British and Scandinavian Legends". Folklore. 102 (1): 16–30. doi:10.1080/0015587X.1991.9715802. ISSN 0015-587X.
- Simpson, Jacqueline (1994-01-01). "Margaret Murray: Who Believed Her, and Why?". Folklore. 105 (1–2): 89–96. doi:10.1080/0015587X.1994.9715877. ISSN 0015-587X.
- Simpson, Jacqueline (1995-01-01). ""The Weird Sisters Wandering": Burlesque Witchery in Montgomerie's Flyting". Folklore. 106 (1–2): 9–20. doi:10.1080/0015587X.1995.9715888. ISSN 0015-587X.
- Simpson, Jacqueline (1995-01-01). "Ellen Ettlinger, 1902–1994". Folklore. 106 (1–2): 86–86. doi:10.1080/0015587X.1995.9715896. ISSN 0015-587X.
- Simpson, Jacqueline (1996-01-01). "Witches and Witchbusters". Folklore. 107 (1–2): 5–18. doi:10.1080/0015587X.1996.9715910. ISSN 0015-587X.
- Simpson, Jacqueline (1997-01-01). ""The Rules of Folklore" in the Ghost Stories of M.R. James". Folklore. 108 (1–2): 9–18. doi:10.1080/0015587X.1997.9715931. ISSN 0015-587X.
- Simpson, Jacqueline (2006-01-01). "Boundaries for Ghosts: A Technique in Folk Exorcism". Folk Life. 45 (1): 70–76. doi:10.1179/flk.2006.45.1.70. ISSN 0430-8778.
- Simpson, Jacqueline (2003-03-01). "Repentant soul or walking corpse? Debatable apparitions in medieval England". Folklore. 114 (3): 389–402. doi:10.1080/0015587032000145397. ISSN 0015-587X.
- Simpson, Jacqueline (2005-08-01). "The Miller's Tomb: Facts, Gossip, and Legend". Folklore. 116 (2): 189–200. doi:10.1080/00155870500140230. ISSN 0015-587X.
- Simpson, Jacqueline (2006-08-01). "Hilda Ellis Davidson (1914–2006)". Folklore. 117 (2): 215–216. doi:10.1080/00155870600707938. ISSN 0015-587X.
- Simpson, Jacqueline (2008-08-01). "Seeking the Lore of the Land". Folklore. 119 (2): 131–141. doi:10.1080/00155870802056936. ISSN 0015-587X.
- Simpson, Jacqueline (2011-04-01). "On the Ambiguity of Elves". Folklore. 122 (1): 76–83. doi:10.1080/0015587X.2011.537133. ISSN 0015-587X.
- Simpson, Jacqueline (2015-05-04). "Sir Terry Pratchett OBE (1948–2015)". Folklore. 126 (2): 232–234. doi:10.1080/0015587X.2015.1042722. ISSN 0015-587X.
- Simpson, Jacqueline (2017-07-03). "Venetia Newall (1935–2017)". Folklore. 128 (3): 316–317. doi:10.1080/0015587X.2017.1334329. ISSN 0015-587X.

=== Books ===
- Simpson, Jacqueline (1965). The Northmen Talk. A Choice of Tales from Iceland, Phoenix House/Dent, & University of Wisconsin Press
- Simpson, Jacqueline (1965). The Northmen talk. A choice of tales from Iceland. Translated and with introduction by Jacqueline Simpson, with a foreword by Eric Linklater. London; Madison: Phoenix House; University of Wisconsin Press. OCLC 854594779.
- Garmonsway, George Norman; Simpson, Jacqueline (1968). Beowulf and its analogues. Translated by G. N. Garmonsway and Jacqueline Simpson. Including Archaeology and Beowulf by Hilda Ellis Davidson. With plates. London; New York: J. M. Dent & Sons; E. P. Dutton & Co. OCLC 854579522.
- Partridge, Eric; Simpson, Jacqueline (1972). The Penguin dictionary of historical slang. Harmondsworth. Penguin Books. ISBN 978-0-14-051046-1. OCLC 1055222502.
- Simpson, Jacqueline; Galsworthy, Gay (1973). The folklore of Sussex. London: Batsford. ISBN 978-0-7134-0240-7. OCLC 696765.
- Simpson, Jacqueline (1976). The folklore of the Welsh border. London: B.T. Batsford. ISBN 978-0-7134-3163-6. OCLC 2817771.
- Simpson, Jacqueline (1980). British dragons. London: Batsford. ISBN 978-0-7134-2559-8. OCLC 925252186.
- Simpson, Jacqueline; Wilson, Eva (1987). Everyday life in the Viking age. New York: Dorset Press. ISBN 978-0-88029-146-0. OCLC 878615912.
- Simpson, Jacqueline (1987). European mythology. New York: P. Bedrick Books. ISBN 978-0-87226-044-3. OCLC 14214952.
- Simpson, Jacqueline; Gowdy, Caroline (1989). Scandinavian Folktales (Penguin Folklore Library / Puffin) ISBN 0-14-059505-8
- Simpson, Jacqueline; Roud, Stephen (2003). A dictionary of English folklore. Oxford; New York: Oxford University Press. ISBN 978-0-19-860766-3. OCLC 53193764.
- Simpson, Jacqueline (2004) Icelandic Folktales and Legends (Revealing History) 2nd ed., NPI Media Group, ISBN 0-7524-3045-9
- Simpson, Jacqueline; Westwood, Jennifer. (2005; reissued 2006). The Lore of the Land: a Guide to England's Legends, from Spring-heeled Jack to the Witches of Warboys, Penguin ISBN 0-14-100711-7 ISBN 0-14-102103-9
- The Folklore of Discworld (with Terry Pratchett), Doubleday (2008) ISBN 978-0-385-61100-8. 2nd, enlarged edition. Corgi 2009 ISBN 978-0-55215-493-2. 3rd enlarged edition, Corgi (2014) ISBN 978-0-552-15493-2 (same ISBN as 2nd edition)
- Simpson, Jacqueline (2010). Elves: nasty or nice?. Wincanton, Somerset: Discworld Emporium :. OCLC 1152655117.
- Simpson, Jacqueline (2010). Green Men and White Swans: the Folklore of British Pub Names, Random House Books ISBN 1-84794-515-5
