= W. F. Ryan =

William Francis Ryan (1937–2023), usually known as W.F. Ryan or Will Ryan, was a British librarian and scholar of Russian language and culture, who was described as "one of the world's foremost experts" on Russian magic and witchcraft.

Ryan was Emeritus Professor and Honorary Fellow, School of Advanced Study, The Warburg Institute, University of London. Ryan died in 2023.

== Career ==
Between 1967 and 1976, Ryan was a lecturer in Russian Language and Literature at the School of Slavonic and East European Studies, University of London. In 1976, he was appointed Academic Librarian at the Warburg Institute, University of London, a position he held until 2002.

In 1999, Ryan published The Bathhouse at Midnight: An Historical Survey of Magic and Divination in Russia (1999), which was described by one reviewer as "the most thorough and detailed study to date on the magic and divination of Russian and Eastern Slav peoples".

== Recognition ==
Ryan was elected as Fellow of the British Academy in 2000. In 2005, Ryan delivered the British Library's Panizzi Lectures, on ‘The Magic of Russia’, which were published in 2006. Between 2005 and 2008, Ryan served as President of the Folklore Society.

== Selected publications ==
- Ryan, W. F; Schmitt, Charles B (eds) (1983). Pseudo-Aristotle the secret of secrets: sources and influences. London: The Warburg Institute. ISBN 978-0-85481-062-8. OCLC 848737353.
- Schmitt, Charles Bernard; Ryan, W. F; Kraye, Jill (eds) (1986). Pseudo-Aristotle in the Middle Ages: the theology and other texts. London: Warburg Institute. ISBN 978-0-85481-065-9. OCLC 884261018.
- Ryan, W. F; Norman, Peter (eds) (1995). The Penguin Russian dictionary. London: Penguin. ISBN 978-0-14-051067-6. OCLC 477191306.
- Ryan, W. F (1999). The bathhouse at midnight: an historical survey of magic and divination in Russia. Stroud: Sutton. OCLC 767558870.
- Ryan, W. F (2006). The Panizzi lectures 2005: Russian magic at the British Library: books, manuscripts, scholars, travellers. London: British Library. ISBN 978-0-7123-4983-3. OCLC 506180806.
- Burnett, Charles; Ryan, W. F (eds) (2006). Magic and the classical tradition. London; Turin: The Warburg Institute; Nino Aragno. ISBN 978-0-85481-131-1. OCLC 804851957.
- Kapaló, J. A.; Pócs, Éva; Ryan, W.F. (eds) (2013). The power of words: studies on charms and charming in Europe. Budapest; New York: Central European University Press. ISBN 978-615-5225-10-9. OCLC 903379636.
- Ryan, W. F; Taube, Moshe (eds) (2019). The Secret of Secrets: The East Slavic Version. Introduction, Text, Annotated Translation, and Slavic Index. London: The Warburg Institute. ISBN 978-1-908590-73-2. OCLC 1182800516.
