= Venetia Newall =

English-American folklorist

Venetia Newall (1935–2017) was an English-American folklorist who was elected president of the Folklore Society and fellow of the American Folklore Society.

== Education ==
Venetia Newall was born in London in 1935, to an American father and English mother. During the Second World War she stayed with her paternal grandfather in the United States. In 1953 she went to the University of St Andrews to read English Language and Literature. She would later gain a doctorate from the University for her work on Folklore.

== Career ==
Newall’s practical interest in Folklore developed from travels in central Europe with her husband John Newall, the journalist and publisher. In 1960, she observed peasant women selling elaborately decorated eggs at market stalls. Newall became a collector of such eggs, and explored customs surrounding them in her extensive study, An Egg at Easter (1971), which won the American Folklore Society's Chicago Folklore Prize in its year of publication.

A member of the British Folklore Society from the early 1960s, she served as Secretary of the Society from 1967 to 1980. She was particularly noted for her networking skills, drawing in scholars from overseas to lecture at meetings of the Folklore Society. During this period she also organized two large-scale events for the Society: the Anglo-American Folklore Conference at Ditchley Park in 1969 and the Folklore Society Centenary Conference at Royal Holloway College in 1978. Newall would serve as President of the Folklore Society from 1985 to 1987.

In the 1970s Newall became a research fellow at the School of Oriental and African Studies in London. She was later a visiting professor at Berkeley. Newall was an active editor of folklore publications: from 1973 to 1978, she was General Editor of The Folklore of the British Isles series of books published by Batsford and in 1981, she founded and edited the International Folklore Review, a journal which ran for eight years and contributed to the development of younger folklorists.

== Selected works ==
- Newall, Venetia (1971). An egg at Easter: a folklore study;. London: Routledge & K. Paul. ISBN 978-0-7100-6845-3. OCLC 204744.
- Newall, Venetia (2008). Discovering the folklore of birds and beasts. Oxford: Shire Publications. ISBN 978-0-85263-126-3. OCLC 671785005.
- Newall, Venetia (1973). The Witch Figure: Folklore Essays Honouring Katharine M. Briggs. London etc.: Routledge & Kegan Paul. OCLC 1205004464.
- Newall, Venetia; Dorson, Richard M (1974). The encyclopedia of witchcraft & magic. New York: A & W Visual library. ISBN 978-0-89104-031-6. OCLC 987274683.
- Newall, Venetia J (1980). Folklore studies in the twentieth century. Woodbridge: Brewer. OCLC 901190803.
