= Gomme =

Gomme is a surname, and may refer to:

- Alan Gomme-Duncan (1893–1963)
- Alice Gomme (1853–1938)
- Andor Gomme (1930–2008)
- Arnold Wycombe Gomme (1886–1959)
- George Gomme (1912–1996)
- (George) Laurence Gomme
- Bernard de Gomme

== See also ==
- Gomme (food)
- Gomme syrup
