= The Case of Lady Camber =

The Case of Lady Camber may refer to:

- The Case of Lady Camber (play), a 1915 British play by Horace Annesley Vachell
- The Case of Lady Camber (film), a 1920 British silent film directed by Walter West

== See also ==
Further adaptations of the play

- Lord Camber's Ladies, a 1932 British film directed by Benn W. Levy
- The Story of Shirley Yorke, a 1948 British film directed by Maclean Rogers
