= Arthur Allan Gomme =

Gomme, Arthur Allan (1882–1955), librarian and historian of technology

- Born: 1882
- Died: 1955 (aged 72–73)

Academic background
- Education: Mercer's School, City and Guilds Central Technical College,

Arthur Allan Gomme (1882-1955) was a British librarian, historian of technology and folklorist.

== Early life and education ==
Arthur Allan Gomme was born in 1882, the third son of Sir (George) Laurence Gomme (1853–1916) and his wife, Alice Bertha Gomme, (1853–1938), both of whom had been pioneering folklorists.

He was educated at Mercer's School from 1895 to 1900 before training in engineering at the City and Guilds Central Technical College (then the Royal College of Science). There Gomme gained a first class diploma and the Siemens Memorial medal for Electrical Engineering.

== Career ==
In 1904 Gomme joined the Patent Office as an Examiner. Gomme served with the 2nd battalion, Royal Fusiliers (university and public schools division) during the First World War. In 1919 he rejoined the Patent Office, and was appointed Librarian to the Patent Office in 1920, a role in which he held until his retirement in 1944. He was awarded the MBE in 1930.

== Interests ==
In 1920 Gomme joined the Newcomen Society, becoming a member of the society's council in 1925. Gomme served for thirty years as a council member was and vice-president in 1953. Gomme contributed papers on the history of patents to Transactions of the Newcomen Society, as well as compiling for the journal, an 'Analytical bibliography of the history of engineering and applied science' (written with E. Wyndham Hume, his predecessor at the Patent Office library).

In 1948 Gomme published Patents of Invention: Origin and Growth of the Patent System in Britain and in 1950 co-compiled a catalogue of the designs of the engineer John Smeaton.

Like his parents, Gomme was active in the field of folklore, served on the council of the Folklore Society from 1911 until his death, and acting as president between 1952 and 1953. As with his mother, Lady Gomme, Allan Gomme was active in Florence White's English Folk Cookery Association, serving from 1928 to 1935 as Chairman of its Advisory Council. In Good Things in England, White recommended that those who might have cookery books and manuscripts in need of a home allow Allan Gomme to acquire them for the Patent Office Library as it "has already the nucleus of a very fine collection of Old English Cookery Books."

Gomme was closely involved in the history of the theatre: he was a member of the British Drama League, the Elizabethan Stage Society and a founder member of the Society for Theatre Research.

== Selected publications ==
- Gomme, Arthur Allan; British Council (1948). Patents of invention: origin and growth of the patent system in Britain. London: Longmans, Green & Co. for British Council and National Book League. OCLC 786350743.
- Newcomen Society (Great Britain); Dickinson, H. W; Gomme, Arthur Allan; Farey, John; Royal Society (Great Britain); Library (1950). A catalogue of the civil and mechanical engineering designs, 1741-1792. London: Printed by the Courier Press. OCLC 28477297.
- Gomme, Allan (1952). "The Folk-Lore Society: Whence and Whither". Folklore. 63 (1): 1–18. doi:10.1080/0015587X.1952.9718086. ISSN 0015-587X.
- Gomme, Allan (1953-06-01). "The Collection of English Folklore : Ways and Means". Folklore. 64 (2): 321–333. doi:10.1080/0015587X.1953.9717356. ISSN 0015-587X.
