= Frumenty =

Porridge of boiled grain in medieval Europe

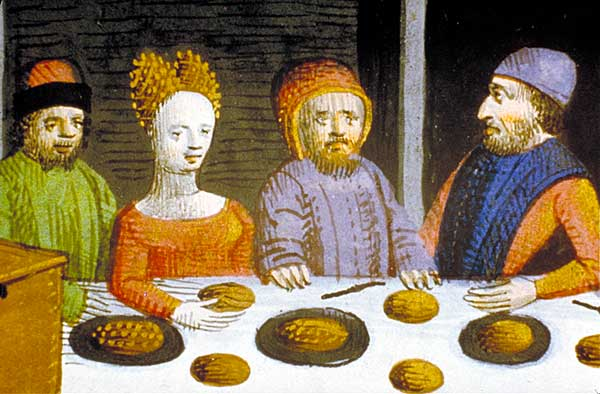
- Diners eating frumenty, Bartholomeus Anglicus
- Alternative names: Frumentee, furmity, furmatree, fromity, fermenty
- Type: Pudding
- Main ingredients: Wheat, milk, eggs or broth

Frumenty (sometimes frumentee, furmity, fromity, or fermenty) is a dish that was popular in Western European medieval cuisine. It is a porridge, a thick boiled grain dish—hence its name, which derives from the Latin word frumentum, "grain". It was usually made with creed wheat boiled with either milk or broth and was a peasant staple. More luxurious recipes included eggs, almonds, currants, sugar, saffron, and orange flower water. Frumenty was served with meat as a pottage, traditionally with venison or even porpoise (considered a "fish" and therefore appropriate for Lent). It was also frequently used as a subtlety, a dish between courses at a banquet.

== In England ==
=== History ===
Florence White, founder of the English Folk Cookery Association, wrote in Good Things in England (1932) that frumenty is England's "oldest national dish". For several centuries, frumenty was part of the traditional Celtic Christmas meal. According to an 1822 Time's Telescope, in Yorkshire, on Christmas Eve:

Supper is served, of which one dish, from the lordly mansion to the humblest shed, is, invariably, furmety; yule cake, one of which is always made for each individual in the family, and other more substantial viands are also added. Poor Robin, in his Almanack for the year 1676, (speaking of the winter quarter,) says, "and lastly, who would but praise it, because of Christmas, when good cheer doth so abound, as if all the world were made of minced pies, plum-pudding, and furmety [sic]."

It was often eaten on Mothering Sunday, the fourth Sunday of Lent, in late spring. On that day many servants were allowed to visit their mothers and were often served frumenty to celebrate and give them a wholesome meal to prepare them for their return journey. The use of eggs would have been a brief respite from the Lenten fast. In Lincolnshire, frumenty was associated with sheep-shearing in June. A diarist recalled of his youth in the 1820s that "almost every farmer in the village made a large quantity of frumenty on the morning they began to clip; and every child in the village was invited to partake of it". A second batch, of better quality, was produced later and taken round in buckets to every house in the village.

Food historian Polly Russell describes one of the first English recipes for it in the 1390 manuscript The Forme of Cury, and how this served as the inspiration for the 2013 Christmas menu at Dinner by Heston Blumenthal, transforming Victorian workhouse food for paupers into modern luxurious dining.

=== Literary references ===
Frumentee is served with venison at a banquet in the mid-14th century North Midlands poem Wynnere and Wastoure: "Venyson with the frumentee, and fesanttes full riche / Baken mete therby one the burde sett", i.e. in modern English, "Venison with the frumenty and pheasants full rich; baked meat by it on the table set". The dish also appears, likewise paired with venison, at the New Year feast in the Middle English poem known as The Alliterative Morte Arthure (c. 1400): "Flesh flourisht of fermison, with frumentee noble."

The dish, described as 'furmity' and served with fruit and a slug of rum added under the counter, plays a role in the plot of Thomas Hardy's novel The Mayor of Casterbridge. It is also mentioned in Lewis Carroll's Through the Looking-Glass as a food that snap-dragon-flies live on. Snap-dragon was a popular game at Christmas, and Carroll's mention of frumenty shows it was known to him as a holiday food. It also appears in a girl's recitation of holiday traditions, in My Lady Ludlow, published 1858, by Elizabeth Gaskell: "furmenty on Mothering Sunday, Violet cakes in Passion Week" (Chapter 2).

=== Recipes ===
Steve Roud, librarian and folklorist, compiled a compendium of The English Year including three recipes for frumenty. They vary considerably by place and time.

1. The typical method of preparation was to parboil whole grains of wheat in water, then strain off and boil in milk, sweeten the boiled product with sugar, and flavour with cinnamon and other spices.
2. Take clean wheat and bray it [beat it into small pieces] in a mortar well that the hulls go all off [this means that the hulls are broken off], and seethe [boil] it till it burst, and take it up [drain it by taking it out of the water] and let it cool; and take fair fresh broth and sweet milk of almonds, or sweet milk of kine [cow's milk] and temper it all, and take yolks of eggs. Boil it a little and set it down and mess it forth ["mess" here in the sense of "plate and serve to table", the same root as naval mess] with fat venison and fresh mutton.
3. Somerset–Wiltshire: About forty years ago [from an unspecified date] country women in shawls and sun bonnets used to come to the market at Weston-super-Mare in little carts carrying little basins of new wheat boiled to a jelly, which was put into a large pot with milk, eggs, and sultanas, and was lightly cooked; the resulting mixture was poured into pie-dishes and served on mid-Lent Sunday and during the ensuing week. Frumenty is still prepared at Devizes for Mothering Sunday.

A healthy dose of spirit is often mentioned as accompanying the frumenty.

== Elsewhere ==
A dish made with boiled cracked wheat and soured milk was made in Ancient Persia and is still used, often as the basis for a soup, in Greece and Cyprus (as trahanas), and in Turkey (tarhana). Kutia is an Eastern European dish with a similar recipe. In Bangladesh, Pakistan and some other South-Asian countries, a dish called kheer is a common milk-based dessert similar to frumenty.

== See also ==
- Wheatberry – Whole wheat kernel without the husk, whole wheat eaten as a food
- List of porridges
