= Santley =

Santley is a surname. Notable people with this name include:

- Sir Charles Santley (1834–1922), English-born opera and oratorio star
- Fred Santley (1887 – 1953), American character actor
- Joseph Santley (1889–1971), American actor, singer, dancer, writer, director and producer
- Kate Santley (c1837–1923), German-born actress, singer and comedian.
