= Lover Come Back =

Lover Come Back may refer to:

- Lover Come Back, a 1940 novel by Clair Blank
- Lover Come Back (1931 film), starring Constance Cummings
- New Moon (1940 film), a musical also known as Lover Come Back, featuring Jeanette MacDonald and Nelson Eddy
- Lover Come Back (1946 film), featuring George Brent and Lucille Ball
- Lover Come Back (1961 film), starring Doris Day and Rock Hudson
- "Lover Come Back", a 1961 song by Doris Day
- "Lover Come Back" (song), a song by City and Colour

== See also ==
- Louvre Come Back to Me!, a 1962 Looney Tunes cartoon directed by Chuck Jones featuring Pepé Le Pew
- "Lover, Come Back to Me", a song written by Sigmund Romberg with lyrics by Oscar Hammerstein II for the 1927 Broadway show The New Moon, also sung in the 1940 film
- "Lover Come Back to Me" (Dead or Alive song), a 1985 single
- "Piya Tu Ab To Aaja" (transl. Lover, Come to Me Now), a song from the 1971 Indian film Caravan
