= The Case of Lady Camber (play) =

Play by Horace Annesley Vachell

The Case of Lady Camber is a play by the British writer Horace Annesley Vachell, which was first performed in 1915. The play was a success in the West End, enjoying a lengthy run at the Savoy Theatre. It was not as well received in New York when it opened at the Lyceum Theatre in 1917.

== Synopsis ==
When Lady Camber, an ex-music hall star, dies in mysterious circumstances, suspicion falls on her young nurse Esther Yorke who is suspected of murdering her so she can marry Lord Camber.

== Film adaptations ==
The play has been turned into films on three occasions:

- A 1920 silent film The Case of Lady Camber, directed by Walter West
- A 1932 film Lord Camber's Ladies, directed by Benn W. Levy and produced by Alfred Hitchcock
- A 1948 film The Story of Shirley Yorke, directed by Maclean Rogers

== Bibliography ==
- Bordman, Gerald. American Theatre: A Chronicle of Comedy and Drama 1914–1930. Oxford University Press, 1995.
- Low, Rachael. The History of the British Film, 1919–1929. George Allen & Unwin, 1971.
