= Andor Gomme =

British architectural historian

Austin Harvey Gomme (7 May 1930 – 19 September 2008), known as Andor Gomme, was a British scholar of English literature and architectural history. He was a frequent reviewer for the Times Literary Supplement, an author of books on both literary criticism and architectural history, and Chairman of the Society of Architectural Historians of Great Britain, whose journal, Architectural History, he edited for many years.

== Life and career ==
Andor was the son of Arnold Wycombe Gomme, a British classical scholar and Professor of Ancient History at the University of Glasgow and Phyllis Kate Harvey. The name "Andor" was originally a nickname, and began as a family joke for the unborn baby (or babies) of unknown sex. He studied at Clare College, Cambridge, where he was taught by F. R. Leavis and attained a First Class Honours degree in Moral Sciences. He was appointed to a three-year fellowship at Gonville and Caius College in 1956.

In 1960, he married fellow scholar Susan Koechlin, with whom he had one son and three daughters. The couple settled in Church Lawton, Cheshire, after Andor obtained a permanent job at Keele University in 1963; he had previously worked in the Extra-Mural Department at the University of Glasgow, and at the University of Montana. At Keele, he was promoted from Lecturer to Senior Lecturer and Reader, achieving the title of Professor of English Literature and Architectural History in 1984 - a job created to represent his personal interests. In 1995 he was appointed to the title of Emeritus.

He was a regular front-page and anonymous reviewer for the Times Literary Supplement, and wrote several books of literary criticism and architectural history. His first book, Attitudes To Criticism, has been described as "a critical celebration of the very similar sensibilities and minds of Leavis and the American Yvor Winters", while his last book, Design and plan in the country house (with co-author Alison Maguire), has been praised by Professor Timothy Mowl as a "remarkable scholarly resource" despite its "ambitious range".

For many years, Gomme was editor of Architectural History, the journal of the Society of Architectural Historians of Great Britain of which he was chairman from 1988 to 1991. He died in Church Lawton on 19 September 2008. The author of his obituary, Emeritus Professor of Cultural Studies Fred Inglis, described Gomme as "one of the best British architectural historians since John Ruskin".

Gomme had a long-standing interest in choral music, and he edited a 1997 reconstruction of J.S. Bach's St Mark Passion which was published by Bärenreiter. The recitatives and turba choruses are drawn from Reinhard Keiser's (1674–1739) St Mark Passion, which Bach himself had adapted for use in Weimar in 1713 (and which influenced Bach's own St Matthew Passion). Gomme was the first to utilise Keiser's recitatives, and he enabled fuller reconstructions by other scholars. Gomme's reconstruction was recorded in 1998 for ASV Records by the Choir of Gonville and Caius College, Cambridge and the Cambridge Baroque Camerata, directed by Geoffrey Webber.

== Publications ==
- Attitudes To Criticism (1966), Southern Illinois University Press. ISBN 978-0-8093-0194-2
- Architecture of Glasgow (1968, with David Walker), Lund Humphries. ISBN 978-0-85331-504-9
- Dickens (1971), Evans. ISBN 978-0-237-35015-4
- D. H. Lawrence : a critical study of the major novels and other writings (1979), Harper and Row. ISBN 978-0-06-492480-1
- Bristol: an architectural history (1979, with Michael Jenner and Bryan Little), Lund Humphries. ISBN 978-0-85331-409-7
- Smith of Warwick: Francis Smith, architect and master-builder (2000), Shaun Tyas. ISBN 978-1-900289-38-2
- Design and Plan in the Country House (2008, with Alison Maguire), Yale University Press. ISBN 978-0-300-12645-7
