= The Big Timer =

1932 film

- Directed by: Edward Buzzell
- Written by: Robert Riskin; Dorothy Howell
- Starring: Ben Lyon; Constance Cummings; Thelma Todd
- Cinematography: L. William O'Connell
- Edited by: Gene Milford
- Production company: Columbia Pictures
- Distributed by: Columbia Pictures
- Release date: March 10, 1932
- Running time: 72 minutes
- Country: United States
- Language: English

The Big Timer is a 1932 American Pre-Code sports drama film directed by Edward Buzzell and starring Ben Lyon, Constance Cummings and Thelma Todd. Produced and distributed by Columbia Pictures, it is about a boxer whose success goes to his head.

== Plot ==
Cooky Bradford wants to make enough money to buy a lunch wagon. He ends up falling for, and fighting for, boxing manager Pop Baldwin's daughter, Honey.

== Cast ==
- Ben Lyon as Cooky Bradford
- Constance Cummings as Honey Baldwin
- Thelma Todd as Kay Mitchell
- Tom Dugan as Catfish
- Robert Emmett O'Connor as Dan Wilson
- Charley Grapewin as John 'Pop' Baldwin
- Russell Hopton as Sullivan

== See also ==
- List of boxing films

== Bibliography ==
- Morgan, Michelle The Ice Cream Blonde: The Whirlwind Life and Mysterious Death of Screwball Comedienne Thelma Todd. Chicago Review Press, 2015.
- Scott, Ian. In Capra's Shadow: The Life and Career of Screenwriter Robert Riskin. University Press of Kentucky, 2014.
