= Return to Tyassi =

1950 play

- Written by: Benn Levy
- Original language: English
- Genre: Drama
- Setting: House near Regent's Park, present day

Premiere
- Date premiered: 20 November 1950
- Place premiered: Theatre Royal, Brighton

Return to Tyassi is a 1950 play by the British writer Benn Levy. The plot concerns a woman with a shady past who attempts to redeem herself. Levy directed the play, which featured his wife Constance Cummings in the lead role.

It premiered at the Theatre Royal, Brighton before transferring to the Duke of York's Theatre in London's West End where it ran for 29 performances between 29 November and 23 December 1950. The original cast included Constance Cummings, Alexander Knox, Helen Haye and John Justin. Poorly received, it was noted "some critics have knocked this play about severely, and may have done it irreparable damage".

== Bibliography ==
- Wearing, J.P. The London Stage 1950-1959: A Calendar of Productions, Performers, and Personnel. Rowman & Littlefield, 2014.
