= Timothy Mowl =

Timothy Mowl FSA (born 1951) is an architectural and landscape historian. He is Emeritus Professor of History of Architecture and Designed Landscapes at the University of Bristol, and Honorary Professor at the Royal Agricultural University, Cirencester. He is also Director of AHC Consultants. He was awarded the Hawksmoor Medal of the Society of Architectural Historians of Great Britain in 1987, was elected a Fellow of the Society of Antiquaries of London in 1993, and served as a member of Council of the Garden History Society between 2002 and 2007. He is currently President of the Avon & Gloucestershire Gardens Trust.

== Career ==
Timothy Mowl was educated at the Oxford School before taking degrees at the University of Bristol and Birmingham University. He studied for his doctorate in architectural history under Sir Howard Colvin at St John's College, Oxford. Mowl's career has included work as an Inspector for English Heritage, an architectural consultant for the Bath Preservation Trust, a journalist on the Bath Chronicle and as a freelance architectural and garden historian. He taught in the departments of History of Art and Archaeology at the University of Bristol before taking early retirement in 2011.

He has published thirty-five books on architectural history, landscape and garden history, biography, planning and conservation.

Together with Barbara Hardy he has just completed a cultural biography of the architect, Basil Champneys, which appeared in August 2026, and his study of Ornamental Gardening in the Regency, All Around is Fairy Ground - Pleasure and the Regency Garden, will be published by Reaktion Books in October 2026.

== Publications ==
- Trumpet at a Distant Gate: The Lodge as Prelude to the Country House (with Brian Earnshaw), London: Waterstones, 1985.
- John Wood: Architect of Obsession (with Brian Earnshaw), Millstream Books, 1988.
- Bristol: Last Age of the Merchant Princes, Millstream Books, 1991.
- To Build the Second City: Architects and Craftsmen of Georgian Bristol, Redcliffe Press, 1991.
- Elizabethan and Jacobean Style, Phaidon, 1993.
- Palladian Bridges: Prior Park and the Whig Connection, Millstream Books, 1993.
- Architecture Without Kings: The Rise of Puritan Classicism under Cromwell (with Brian Earnshaw), Manchester University Press, 1995.
- Cheltenham Betrayed, Redcliffe Press, 1995.
- Horace Walpole: The Great Outsider, John Murray, 1996.
- William Beckford: Composing for Mozart, John Murray, 1998.
- The Sack of Bath and After (with Adam Fergusson), Michael Russell, 1989.
- An Insular Rococo: Architecture, Politics and Society in Ireland and England, 1710–1770, (with Brian Earnshaw), Reaktion, 1999.
- Stylistic Cold Wars: Betjeman versus Pevsner, John Murray, 2000 (paperback edition 2011).
- Gentlemen and Players: Gardeners of the English Landscape, Sutton Publishing, 2000 (revised edition Gentlemen Gardeners: The Men Who Recreated the English Landscape Garden, 2004).
- Historic Gardens of Gloucestershire, Tempus Publishing, 2002 (Reprinted 2005).
- Historic Gardens of Dorset, Tempus Publishing, 2003 (Reprinted 2004).
- Historic Gardens of Wiltshire, Tempus Publishing, 2004.
- Historic Gardens of Cornwall, Tempus Publishing, 2005.
- Historic Gardens of Worcestershire, Tempus Publishing, 2006.
- William Kent: Architect, Designer, Opportunist, Jonathan Cape, 2006 (paperback - Pimlico, 2007)
- Bristol: City on the Edge, Frances Lincoln, 2006.
- Historic Gardens of Oxfordshire, Tempus Publishing, 2007.
- Historic Gardens of Northamptonshire, Tempus Publishing, 2008.
- Historic Gardens of Cheshire, Redcliffe Press, 2008.
- Historic Gardens of Staffordshire, Redcliffe Press, 2009.
- Historic Gardens of Somerset, Redcliffe Press, 2010.
- Historic Gardens of Warwickshire, Redcliffe Press, 2011.
- Historic Gardens of Herefordshire, Redcliffe Press, 2012.
- Historic Gardens of Cambridgeshire & The Isle of Ely, Redcliffe Press, 2013.
- Historic Gardens of Hampshire, Stephen Morris, 2015.
- Bristol Explored: Twelve Architectural Walks, Stephen Morris, 2015.
- Architect of Obsession: John Wood and the Creation of Georgian Bath, Stephen Morris, 2022.
- Unbuilt Bath: The City as it Might Have Been (with Julian Orbach), Stephen Morris, 2023
- Unbuilt Cambridge (with Julian Orbach), Stephen Morris, 2025
- A Most Brilliant Outsider - The Cultural Life of Basil Champneys (with Barbara Hardy), Stephen Morris, 2026
- All Around is Fairy Ground - Pleasure and the Regency Garden, Reaktion Books, 2026
