= Fred Santley =

American actor

- Born: Frederic Mansfield; November 20, 1887; Salt Lake City, Utah, U.S.
- Died: May 14, 1953 (aged 65); Los Angeles, California, U.S.
- Occupation: Actor
- Years active: 1919–1944
- Spouse(s): Marion Simpson, ?-1913 (her death)

Fred Santley (November 20, 1887 – May 14, 1953), also known variously as Freddie Santley, Fredric Santley, Frederick Santley, Frederic Santley, and Fredric M. Santley, was an American character actor of the silent and sound film eras, as well as an actor on the Broadway stage.

== Early life ==
Born in Salt Lake City, Utah on November 20, 1887, as Frederic Mansfield, the son of actress Laurene Santley and the stepson of stage actor Eugene Santley. He was the brother of filmmaker and stage actor Joseph Santley, both of whom adopted the surname of their stepfather as their stage name.

== Career ==
Santley would make his acting debut in the 1907 short film Pony Express and would continue to make shorts throughout the 1910s and 1920s. He also appeared in numerous plays during this period, including more than a dozen Broadway productions.

He would make his feature film debut with a small role in 1930's Leathernecking, a musical comedy starring Irene Dunne. He would appear in over 90 more feature films during his almost 25-year career. Some of the more notable films he appeared in were: Anything Goes (1936), starring Bing Crosby and Ethel Merman; the 1937 Tyrone Power vehicle, Alexander's Ragtime Band; the Michael Curtiz film Yankee Doodle Dandy (1943), starring James Cagney; 1946's Night and Day, the Cole Porter biopic starring Cary Grant, Alexis Smith, and Monty Woolley; Vincente Minnelli's Father of the Bride (1950), starring Spencer Tracy, Joan Bennett, and Elizabeth Taylor; and the 1951 comedy, Angels in the Outfield. His final appearance was in the big budget musical, The Farmer Takes a Wife (1953), released after his death. Santley died on May 14, 1953, in Los Angeles.

== Filmography ==
(Per AFI database)

- Leathernecking (1930)
- Three Who Loved (1931)
- A Dangerous Affair (1931)
- Lover Come Back (1931)
- If I Had a Million (1932)
- Virtue (1932)
- She Done Him Wrong (1933)
- Broadway Thru a Keyhole (1933)
- Morning Glory (1933)
- Three-Cornered Moon (1933)
- Walls of Gold (1933)
- Double Harness (1933)
- One in a Million (1934)
- Ready for Love (1934)
- Such Women Are Dangerous (1934)
- The Captain Hates the Sea (1934)
- The Daring Young Man (1935)
- King Solomon of Broadway (1935)
- It Happened in New York (1935)
- Here Comes the Band (1935)
- Night Life of the Gods (1935)
- George White's 1935 Scandals (1935)
- After the Thin Man (1936)
- Her Master's Voice (1936)
- Anything Goes (1936)
- This Is My Affair (1937)
- Meet the Missus (1937)
- Stage Door (1937)
- She's Got Everything (1937)
- Sweethearts (1938)
- Alexander's Ragtime Band (1938)
- Swing, Sister, Swing (1938)
- Topa Topa (1938)
- The Family Next Door (1939)
- Little Accident (1939)
- Two Bright Boys (1939)
- Dancing on a Dime (1940)
- Dr. Kildare's Crisis (1940)
- Danger on Wheels (1940)
- Slightly Tempted (1940)
- Private Affairs (1940)
- Double Date (1941)
- Double Trouble (1941)
- Sunny (1941)
- Unfinished Business (1941)
- Call of the Canyon (1942)
- The Fleet's In (1942)
- Flight Lieutenant (1942)
- Joan of Ozark (1942)
- Lady in a Jam (1942)
- Moonlight Masquerade (1942)
- Sleepytime Gal (1942)
- True to the Army (1942)
- We Were Dancing (1942)
- Yokel Boy (1942)
- Dixie (1943)
- Henry Aldrich Gets Glamour (1943)
- True to Life (1943)
- Yankee Doodle Dandy (1943)
- Goodnight, Sweetheart (1944)
- Rosie the Riveter (1944)
- Hitchhike to Happiness (1945)
- Hold That Blonde (1945)
- The Strange Affair of Uncle Harry (1945)
- You Came Along (1945)
- Her Kind of Man (1946)
- Night and Day (1946)
- That Brennan Girl (1946)
- California (1947)
- Lady in the Lake (1947)
- Merton of the Movies (1947)
- Suddenly, It's Spring (1947)
- That's My Gal (1947)
- Arch of Triumph (1948)
- The Prince of Thieves (1948)
- Two Guys from Texas (1948)
- Act of Violence (1949)
- Adventure in Baltimore (1949)
- Dial 1119 (1950)
- Father of the Bride (1950)
- Mrs. O'Malley and Mr. Malone (1950)
- Mystery Street (1950)
- The Skipper Surprised His Wife (1950)
- Three Little Words (1950)
- Two Weeks with Love (1950)
- Angels in the Outfield (1951)
- Excuse My Dust (1951)
- Texas Carnival (1951)
- Because You're Mine (1952)
- It's a Big Country (1952)
- The Farmer Takes a Wife (1953)
- Cry of the Hunted (1953)
