= Arthur H. Vachell =

English painter (1864–1933)

Arthur Vachell
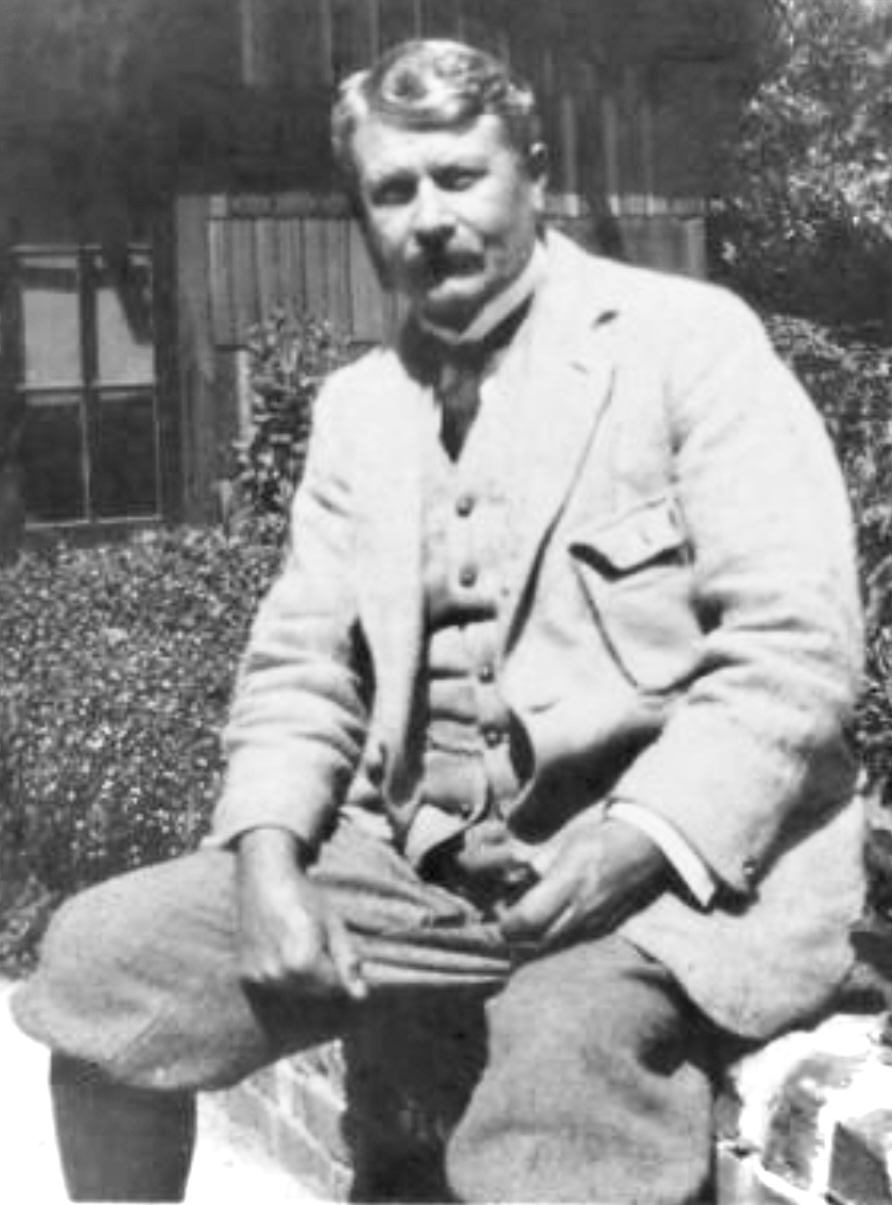
- Vachell in his garden in Carmel ca. 1916
- Born: Arthur Honywood Vachell; November 8, 1864; Dover, England
- Died: June 1, 1933 (aged 68); Exmouth, England
- Resting place: St Thomas à Becket Church, Widcombe
- Education: Harrow School
- Occupation: Painter
- Years active: 1905-1923
- Known for: Introducing polo to the West Coast

Arthur H. Vachell (November 8, 1864 – June 1, 1933), also known as A. V., was an English watercolorist who was associated with the art colony in Carmel-by-the-Sea, California.

== Early life and education ==
Vachell was born on November 8, 1864, in Dover, England. He was the third of three sons. His older siblings included the writer Horace Annesley Vachell and Lucy, while his younger brother was Guy. His father, Richard Tanfield Vachell, was a former landowner, and his mother, Georgina, was the daughter of Arthur Lyttelton-Annesley.

== Career ==
In 1881, Vachell and his two brothers, Arthur and Guy, relocated to California, buying land at Rancho Corral de Piedra, which they named "Tally Ho." Situated in the Arroyo Grande basin, to the southeast of San Luis Obispo, California, they began planting trees and vines.

On May 20, 1887, Horace and Arthur, along with their San Luis Polo Club, competed against the San Francisco Polo Club in Arroyo Grande, California, drawing a crowd of 500 spectators.

During their time in San Luis Obispo, Arthur, Guy, and Horace were involved in acting in the play Jane at the Pavilion Theater. The San Luis Obispo Tribune said, "It was a very enjoyable play, well stages and well played."

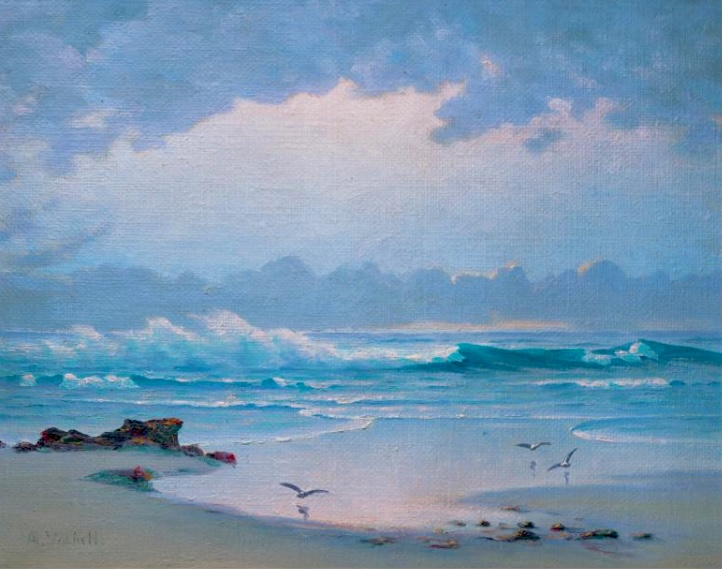
Arthur Vachell, Carmel Beach, ca. 1910

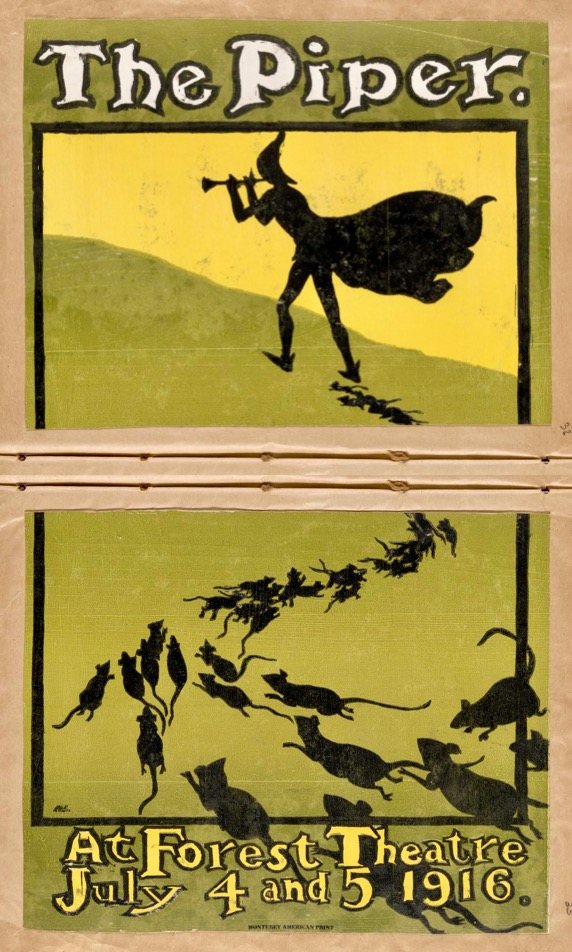
Vachell made this woodblock poster for the play The Piper for the Forest Theater (1916)

He painted landscapes, garden scenes, and seascapes of the Carmel Beach.

Vachell's had friendships within the literary and arts community.

For the Forest Theatre Society, Vachell acted in the role of Tweedle-dee in Alice in Wonderland. He also performed on the stage of the Greek Theater at the University of California, Berkeley campus in a production of The Toad.

In 1916, Vachell, among other locals acted in and painted the scenery for th play The Piper, presented by the Arts and Crafts Club at the Forest Theater.

In 1927, Horace and Arthur relocated to England and bought the large 18th century, English country estate, Widcombe Manor House, in Widcombe, Bath, England.

== Death ==
Vachell died on June 1, 1933, in Exmouth, England, at the age of 69.

== See also ==
- Timeline of Carmel-by-the-Sea, California
