= Peter Nailor =

British political scientist (1928–1996)

Professor Peter Nailor
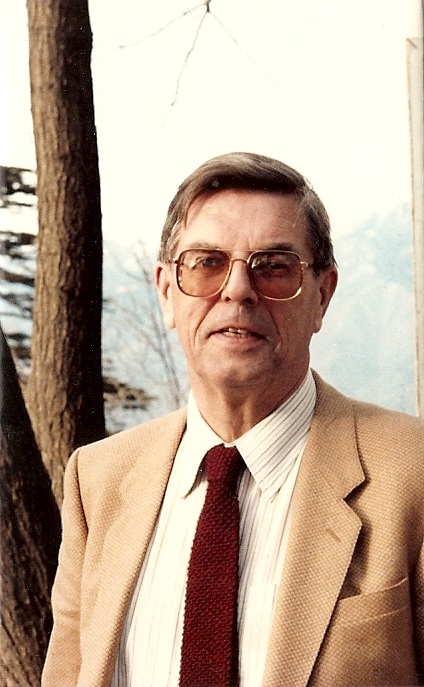
- Nailor in 1980
- Born: 16 December 1928; 96 years ago
- Died: 5 April 1996 (aged 67); London, United Kingdom
- Education: Wadham College, Oxford

Professor Peter Nailor (16 December 1928 – 5 April 1996) was a British civil servant and academic, who served as Professor of Politics at the University of Lancaster, Professor of History at the Royal Naval College, Greenwich, and Provost of Gresham College.

== Early life and education ==
The eldest son of Leslie Nailor and his wife Lily Matilda (née Jones), he was educated at Mercers' School and studied at Wadham College, Oxford, where he obtained his Bachelor of Arts degree in 1952 and his master of arts degree in 1955.

== Civil service career ==
Nailor was a British civil servant for seventeen years. He initially joined the Home Civil Service in 1952 and was first appointed Assistant Principal at the Admiralty. He then served as First Lord's representative on the Admiralty Interview Board, 1960–62; a member of the Polaris Executive, 1962–1967; and Assistant Secretary, Ministry of Defence, 1967-1969. In his last posting, he dealt with future planning in Defence Secretariat 22, implementing the recommendations of Lord Fulton's Report.

== Academic career ==
On leaving the Civil Service in 1969, Nailor became Professor of Politics at Lancaster University until 1977, when he was appointed Professor of History and International relations at the Royal Naval College. While in this post he served additionally as Dean at the Royal Naval College, Greenwich, in 1982-84 and 1986–1988, as well as Chairman, British International Studies Association, 1983-1986. He held visiting research appointments and professorships in Canada, Australia, and India. He served as a member of the Political Science Committee of the Social Science Research Council, 1975–1981; the Foreign and Commonwealth Office advisory panel on arms control and disarmament, 1975–1988; and the Ministry of Defence advisory panel of historical records, 1979-1988.

In 1988, Nailor was appointed Provost of Gresham College and held that position at his death in 1996 at the age of 67. A biennial lecture on defence is held in his honour, under the title The Peter Nailor Memorial Lecture in Defence.

== Published works ==
- The future of Britain's deterrent force by Peter Nailor and Jonathan Alford. London: International Institute for Strategic Studies, 1980.
- The Soviet Union and the Third World, edited by E. J. Feuchtwanger and Peter Nailor. London: Macmillan, 1981.
- The Nassau connection: the organisation and management of the British POLARIS project, London: H.M.S.O, 1988.
- Learning from precedent in Whitehall. London: Institute of Contemporary British History/Royal Institute of Public Administration, 1991.

== Sources ==
- Obituary, The Independent, 10 April 1996
