= Bruce Allsopp =

British architectural historian, educator and publisher (1912–2000)

Harold Bruce Allsopp
- Born: 4 July 1912; Oxford, England
- Died: 22 February 2000 (aged 87)
- Occupations: Lecturer, historian
- Known for: Architectural historian Co-founder of the Society of Architectural Historians of Great Britain

Harold Bruce Allsopp FSA FRIBA (4 July 1912 – 22 February 2000) was a British architectural historian, educator and publisher.

== Career ==
Howard Bruce Allsopp was born in 1912 in Oxford to Heny Allsopp, a historian, poet and vice principal of Ruskin College, and his wife Elizabeth May Allsopp (née Robertson). Bruce Allsopp attended Crimsworth School and Manchester Grammar School before studying architecture at the University of Liverpool School of Architecture under Sir Charles Reilly, Sir Patrick Abercrombie and Lionel Bailey Budden. He served in the Royal Engineers during World War II and taught at Leeds School of Art from 1935 to 1946. During 1935 he married Florence Cyrilla Woodroffe. From 1946 he taught at Newcastle University School of Architecture (originally part of Durham University), where he held a variety of posts, including senior lecturer and director of architectural studies. In 1957 he was elected a fellow of the Royal Institute of British Architects.

Allsopp was a co-founder of the Society of Architectural Historians of Great Britain in 1955 and served as its first chair. In 1962 he founded the Oriel Press. In 1970 he was elected as the Master of the Art Workers' Guild.

Allsopp said in Architect and Patron:

The architect is tied to humanity in a way which the painter, poet or musician is not. This is, in a way, a limitation, but it is also the chief glory of his art.

== Selected published works ==
- Art and the Nature of Architecture 1952
- Decoration Furniture Vol. 1. The English Tradition 1952
- A History of Renaissance Architecture 1959
- A General History of Architecture 1960
- A History of Classical Architecture 1965
- The Great Tradition of Western Architecture 1968
- Historic Architecture of Newcastle upon Tyne 1969
- Modern Architecture of Northern England 1969
- The Study of Architectural History 1970
- Romanesque Architecture: the Romanesque achievement 1971
- A Modern Theory of Architecture 1977
- The Garden Earth. The Case for Ecological Morality 1972
- Towards a Humane Architecture 1974
- The Larousse Guide to the Architecture of Europe 1985
- Spirit of Europe: a subliminal history 1997
