= Mercers' School =

Former school in the City of London

Coordinates: 51.5177°N 0.1098°W

The Mercers' School was an independent school in the City of London, England, with a history going back at least to 1542, and perhaps much further. It was operated by the Worshipful Company of Mercers and was closed in 1959.

== History ==
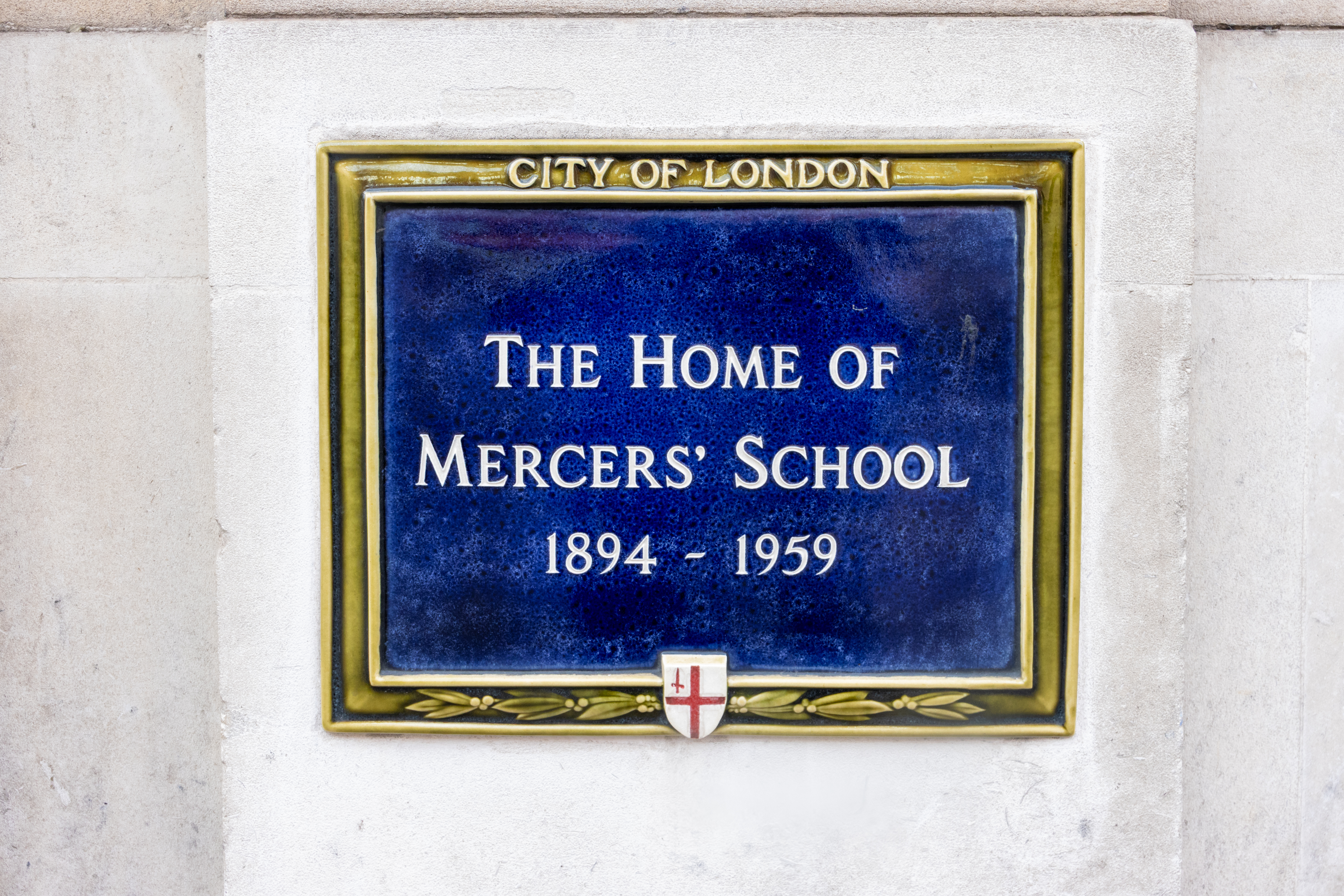
Plaque at the 1894–1959 site of the School

After the dissolution of the Hospital of St Thomas of Acre in 1538, the hospital's land was bought by the Mercers' Company, and the school was founded in 1542 under letters patent of King Henry VIII dated 18 April 1542. It is possible that the new school continued one that had been established in the hospital by an Act of Parliament of 1447, which may have dated back as far as the foundation of the hospital itself in 1190. At different times the school had several different homes in the City of London: Cheapside, Old Jewry, and College Hill (Dowgate); in 1894 it moved to Barnard's Inn, a site on the south side of Holborn.

The school was admitted to the Headmasters' Conference in 1935. It finally closed in 1959.

The passageway leading to the Mercers' School's porter's lodge and playground with Queen Anne headstone (which traditionally new boys were forced to kiss), the Headmaster's rooms and dining hall, with early flags and inscribed panel walls giving the names and dates of headmasters over the centuries, still exist at the Barnard's Inn buildings in Chancery Lane. The Guild of Mercers' Scholars was established c. 1947 as the "Civic Guild of Old Mercers", with the aim of encouraging former students to become Freemen of the City of London and join livery companies pertaining to their trades or professions.

== Former pupils ==
Those educated at the Mercers' School include:

- Sir Thomas James Barnes (1888–1964), lawyer
- James Boevey (1622–1696), merchant, lawyer and philosopher
- Peter Southouse Cheyney (1896–1951), crime writer
- Frederic George D'Aeth (1875–1940), social administrator and lecturer
- Cyril Dean Darlington (1903–1981), biologist
- Stanley Clinton Davis, Baron Clinton-Davis (born 1928)
- Sir Henry Ellis (1777–1869), librarian
- Sir Alfred Gilbert (1854–1934), sculptor
- Arthur Allan Gomme (1882–1955), librarian and president of The Folklore Society
- Sir Bradford Leslie (1831–1926), civil engineer
- Douglas Neil Kennedy (1892–1988), folk musician and dancer
- Peter Nailor (1928–1996), academic
- Robert Paynter (1928–2010), cinematographer
- Nicolas Roeg (1928–2018), film director
- William Lloyd Webber (1914–1982), organist and composer
- Edward Wynn (1889–1956), bishop
- John Young (c. 1532–1605), bishop
