= Brian Earnshaw =

British author (1929–2014)

Brian Earnshaw (26 December 1929 – 15 February 2014) was a British author, known for his Dragonfall 5 series, illustrated by Simon Stern.

== Biography ==
Brian Earnshaw was born in Wrexham, Wales on 26 December 1929. He attended Pembroke College, Cambridge, where he read English. He then spent a number of years as a secondary school teacher in different locations in the UK. From 1964 until his retirement he was a lecturer in English Literature at St Paul's College, Cheltenham (a teacher training college with Bristol University qualifications). In 1982 he completed a doctorate at Warwick University with a thesis entitled 'Translations from German and their Reception in Britain 1760–1800'. After retiring, he moved to Bristol, and worked with Timothy Mowl on a range of books on British architectural and garden history. These sometimes appear with Earnshaw as Mowl's co-author, and sometimes with him in Mowl's acknowledgement as a researcher. He had a great love of botany and travel, and made extensive trips around Europe and elsewhere studying flowers, architecture, gardens and history. Earnshaw died on 15 February 2014, at the age of 84. His ashes were scattered in St Davids, Pembrokeshire.

== Bibliography ==
=== Series ===
==== Star Jam Pack ====
- Starclipper and the Song Wars (1985) ISBN 978-0-416-51630-2
- Starclipper on the Snowstone (1986) ISBN unknown
- Starclipper and the Galactic Final (1987) ISBN 0-416-00802-X

==== Dragonfall 5 ====
- Dragonfall 5 and the Royal Beast (1972) ISBN 0-416-84240-2
- Dragonfall 5 and the Space Cowboys (1972) ISBN 0-416-63380-3
- Dragonfall 5 and the Empty Planet (1973) ISBN 0-688-41732-9
- Dragonfall 5 and the Hijackers (1974) ISBN 978-0-416-84230-2
- Dragonfall 5 and the Master Mind (1975) ISBN 0-416-83050-1
- Dragonfall 5 and the Super Horse (1977) ISBN 978-0-416-56520-1
- Dragonfall 5 and the Haunted World (1979) ISBN 0-416-86850-9

=== Adult novels ===
- And the Mistress Pursuing (1966) ISBN 978-0-340-02834-6
- Planet in the Eye of Time (1968) ISBN 978-0-340-04334-9

=== Other teenage novels ===
- The Rock Dog Gang (1987) ISBN 978-0-416-02042-7
- Planet of the Jumping Bears (1990) ISBN 0-434-97541-9
- Next Stop, Wildstar (1994) ISBN 0-434-97822-1

=== Non-fiction ===
- Trumpet at a Distant Gate: The Lodge as Prelude to the Country House Timothy Mowl and Brian Earnshaw, London: Waterstones, 1985 ISBN 0-947752-05-6
- John Wood: Architect of Obsession Timothy Mowl and Brian Earnshaw, Bath: Millstream Books, 1988 ISBN 0-948975-13-X
- Architecture Without Kings: The Rise of Puritan Classicism under Cromwell, Timothy Mowl and Brian Earnshaw, New York: Manchester Univ. Press, 1995 (Sept.) ISBN 0-7190-4678-5, ISBN 0-7190-4679-3
- An Insular Rococo: Architecture, Politics and Society in Ireland and England, 1710–1770, Timothy Mowl and Brian Earnshaw, London: Reaktion Books, 1999 ISBN 1-86189-044-3

== Poetry ==
- At St. David's A Year, London: Hodder & Stoughton, 1968 ISBN 0-340-02503-4
- Cavafy Gone Gothic, Bristol: Redcliffe Press, 2008 ISBN 978-1-906593-06-3
