= Susan Fleming =

American actress (1908–2002)

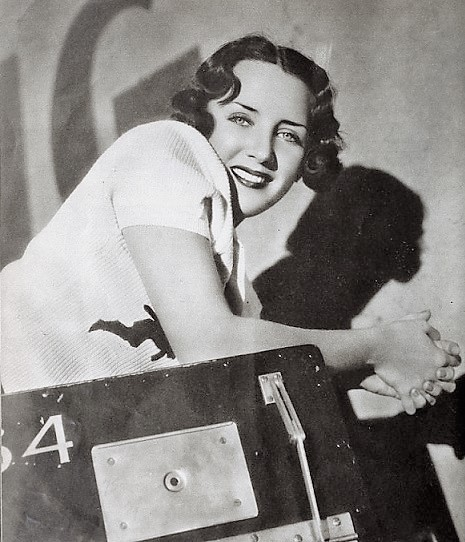
- Fleming in 1933
- Born: Susan Alva Fleming; February 19, 1908; New York City, NY, U.S.
- Died: December 22, 2002 (aged 94); Rancho Mirage, California, U.S.
- Other names: Suzanne Fleming; Susan F. Marx; Susan Fleming Marx
- Occupation: Actress
- Years active: 1926–1954
- Spouse: Harpo Marx (m. 1936; died 1964)
- Children: 4

Susan Alva Fleming (February 19, 1908 – December 22, 2002) was an American actress and the wife of comic actor Harpo Marx and sister in law to Groucho, Chico, Zeppo and Gummo. Fleming was known as the "Girl with the Million Dollar Legs" for a role she played in the W. C. Fields film Million Dollar Legs (1932). Her big stage break, which led to her Hollywood career, was as a Ziegfeld girl, performing in Rio Rita.

== Career ==
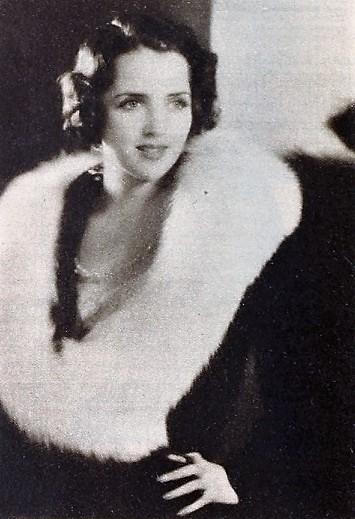
Susan Fleming in 1931.

Fleming was from New York City and went to school in Forest Hills, Queens. After starring in the Ziegfeld Follies productions on Broadway, she started appearing in movies with The Ace of Cads, in which she appeared under the name Suzanne Fleming. One of her earliest film roles was a starring role in The Range Feud as Judy Walton, the love interest of John Wayne. Fleming combined her dancing and cinematic interests in the 1932 movie Million Dollar Legs, in which she played the daughter of W. C. Fields's character. As part of a publicity stunt for the film, her legs were insured for the eponymous million dollars.

Fleming was unhappy with Hollywood, stating in a 1995 interview that she found "nothing more boring than working on a movie... I hated it!".

== Personal life ==
I first met Harpo at a party as is typical in Hollywood. I sat next to him and Fanny Brice. He had taken her to the party because he felt she would be entertaining, and he loved to be entertained.

At a dinner party held in the home of Samuel Goldwyn in 1932, Fleming was seated next to Harpo Marx and found him fascinating. Despite his silent persona in films, she found Marx to be "a warm, fun, darling man to talk to". She pursued him relentlessly, dating for four years and proposing marriage to him on three occasions before he accepted. She ended her Hollywood career when she married Marx on September 28, 1936. Fleming's wedding to Marx was revealed to the public when President of the United States Franklin D. Roosevelt sent the couple a telegram of congratulations in November. Marx had sent a thank you letter to Roosevelt in appreciation for a signed photograph of the President, in which Marx had stated that he was "in line for congratulations, too, having been married since September" in an unspecified "little town up North".

Fleming was happy to leave show business, serving as Marx's "valet" and raising their four children, whom they had adopted. In addition to his widespread interest in playing musical instruments, including his trademark harp, Fleming helped foster her husband's interest in painting; she would make elaborate frames for his paintings, as well as creating her own works of art. The two collected many artworks, which Fleming donated widely after her husband's death. In 1956, they moved to Rancho Mirage, California, with three out of the four other Marx Brothers; Gummo, Zeppo and Groucho building homes nearby.

Fleming became active in local community affairs, was the first woman on the board of College of the Desert and was elected to the Palm Springs Unified School District Board of Education.

Harpo Marx died at age 75 on September 28, 1964, their 28th wedding anniversary. Following his death, Fleming became more involved in local activities, including the local League of Women Voters. She became an advisory planning commissioner for Rancho Mirage, California, and headed an organization dedicated to preserving development on the fragile desert hillsides. She served a total of 18 years on the district board of education and ran and lost in a campaign for the California State Assembly. Honoring her contributions, a Golden Palm Star on the Palm Springs, California, Walk of Stars was dedicated to her in 2002.

In a 1981 decision later overruled by the United States Court of Appeals for the Second Circuit in a case brought by Fleming, federal judge William C. Conner ruled that the producers of A Day in Hollywood / A Night in the Ukraine had improperly used the Marx Brothers characters in their Broadway theatre production and that the publicity rights of the comedians, even after their deaths, overrode the First Amendment issues raised by the show's creators. In April 1980, Conner refused to issue a preliminary injunction and allowed producer Alexander H. Cohen to open the show as planned.

== Death ==
Fleming outlived Marx by almost forty years during which she was an artist and activist in the Palm Springs area. She died at age 94 on December 22, 2002, of a heart attack at Eisenhower Medical Center in Rancho Mirage. She died on the same day as her close friend, Mary De Vithas, her brother-in-law Chico Marx's second wife.

== Filmography ==
Film
Year	Title	Role	Notes
1926	The Ace of Cads	Joan	as Suzanne Fleming
1931	Lover Come Back	Susan	
1931	Arizona	Dot	Uncredited; Alternative title: Men Are Like That
1931	A Dangerous Affair	Florence	
1931	Range Feud	Judy Walton	
1932	Ladies of the Jury	Suzanne	Uncredited
1932	Careless Lady	Guest of Captain Girard	Uncredited
1932	Million Dollar Legs	Angela Barret	
1932	Heritage of the Desert	Dance Hall Girl	Uncredited; Alternative title: When the West Was Young
1933	Olsen's Big Moment	Virginia West	Alternative title: Olsen's Night Out
1933	He Learned About Women	Joan Allen	
1933	I Love That Man	Miss Jones, Stenographer	
1933	My Weakness	Jacqueline Wood	
1933	Broadway Through a Keyhole	Chorine	Uncredited
1934	Now I'll Tell	Minor role	Uncredited; Alternative titles: When New York Sleeps; When New York Sleeps
1934	She Learned About Sailors	Departing Sailor's Girlfriend	Uncredited
1934	Charlie Chan's Courage	Chorus Girl	
1934	Call It Luck	Alice Blue	
1934	Elinor Norton	Publisher's Staff	Uncredited
1935	George White's 1935 Scandals	Chorine	Uncredited
1935	Break of Hearts	Elise	
1935	Navy Wife	Jenny	Alternative title: Beauty's Daughter
1936	The Great Ziegfeld	Ziegfeld Girl	Uncredited
1936	Star for a Night	Mildred La Rue	
1936	Gold Diggers of 1937	Lucille Bailey (Hobart's secretary)	
1937	God's Country and the Woman	Grace Moran, Steve's Secretary	
Television
Year	Title	Role	Notes
1954	Inner Sanctum	Liz	Episode: "The Fatal Hour" (final appearance)
