= Dragonfall 5 =

Series of science fiction novels by Brian Earnshaw

Dragonfall 5 is a series of children's science fiction novels written by Brian Earnshaw during the 1970s and illustrated by Simon Stern.

== Overview ==
The series takes place in the 3rd millennium and concerns a (presumably British) family made up of Tim, Sanchez, Old Elias and Big Mother, traveling in the eponymous spaceship, the Dragonfall 5. They transport goods, passengers and other items to a variety of worlds. They have a pet dog called Jerk, who is a breed of flying hounds who can glide using his long ears, and three small rodent-like animals called Minims that can jointly translate most alien languages.

== Books ==
1. Dragonfall 5 and the Royal Beast (1972): Transporting the valuable and rare anima Royal Beast, the crew of Dragonfall 5 set down on a lush forest world to stock up on food.
2. Dragonfall 5 and the Space Cowboys (1972): Their engine in need of repair, Dragonfall 5 drifts into a world made of asteroids. They learn it was once a planet, until a war with 'Outsiders' broke the world into chunks, still with atmosphere. Now space cowboys fly punch-riders over their herds of cattle across the green asteroids.
3. Dragonfall 5 and the Empty Planet (1973): Tim and his brother Sanchez have to attend school on the Empty Planet, a place of whispering trees and musical rocks, from which the last inhabitants vanished without a trace.
4. Dragonfall 5 and the Hijackers (1974): An old enemy plans to take control of Dragonfall 5 while they are on the water world of seals and walruses.
5. Dragonfall 5 and the Master Mind (1975): Dragonfall 5 is hired to ship grain to a planet of rabbit clans, split into White and Black tribes. Tim and Sanchez will be required to travel deep into the flooded tunnels to seek out the Master Mind for answers.
6. Dragonfall 5 and the Super Horse (1977): A new star-drive has been developed. With questions raised about its safety, the crew of Dragonfall 5 are hired to be investigators to the world of the horses.
7. Dragonfall 5 and the Haunted World (1979): Transporting intergalactic arms dealers, the crew of Dragonfall 5 must take a voyage to the Haunted World to raise much-needed funds.
