= A Dangerous Affair (1931 film) =

1931 film directed by Edward Sedgwick

- Directed by: Edward Sedgwick
- Written by: Howard J. Green
- Produced by: Harry Cohn
- Starring: Jack Holt; Ralph Graves; Sally Blane
- Cinematography: Ted Tetzlaff
- Edited by: Gene Havlick
- Production company: Columbia Pictures
- Distributed by: Columbia Pictures
- Release date: September 30, 1931
- Running time: 75 minutes
- Country: United States
- Language: English

A Dangerous Affair is a 1931 American pre-Code mystery film directed by Edward Sedgwick and starring Jack Holt, Ralph Graves and Sally Blane.

== Plot ==
Members of the Randolph family assemble to hear how millions of dollars will be distributed according to a will, but the attorney in charge is murdered. A police lieutenant eventually finds the murderer in a film that Harrison's Reports said included "every known device to hold the spectator in breathless suspense—trap doors, mysterious murders and disappearances, screams, and bony arms protruding from behind half-closed doors, grabbing unsuspecting victims by the throat ...".

== Cast ==
- Jack Holt as Lt. McHenry
- Ralph Graves as Wally Cook
- Sally Blane as Marjory Randolph
- Susan Fleming as Florence
- Blanche Friderici as Letty Randolph
- Edward Brophy as Nelson
- DeWitt Jennings as City Editor
- Tyler Brooke as Harvey
- William V. Mong as Lionel
- Fred Santley as Tom
- Sidney Bracey as Plunkett
- Charles Middleton as Tupper
- Esther Muir as Peggy

== Bibliography ==
- Michael Zmuda. The Five Sedgwicks: Pioneer Entertainers of Vaudeville, Film and Television. McFarland, 2015.
