= He Learned About Women =

1933 film

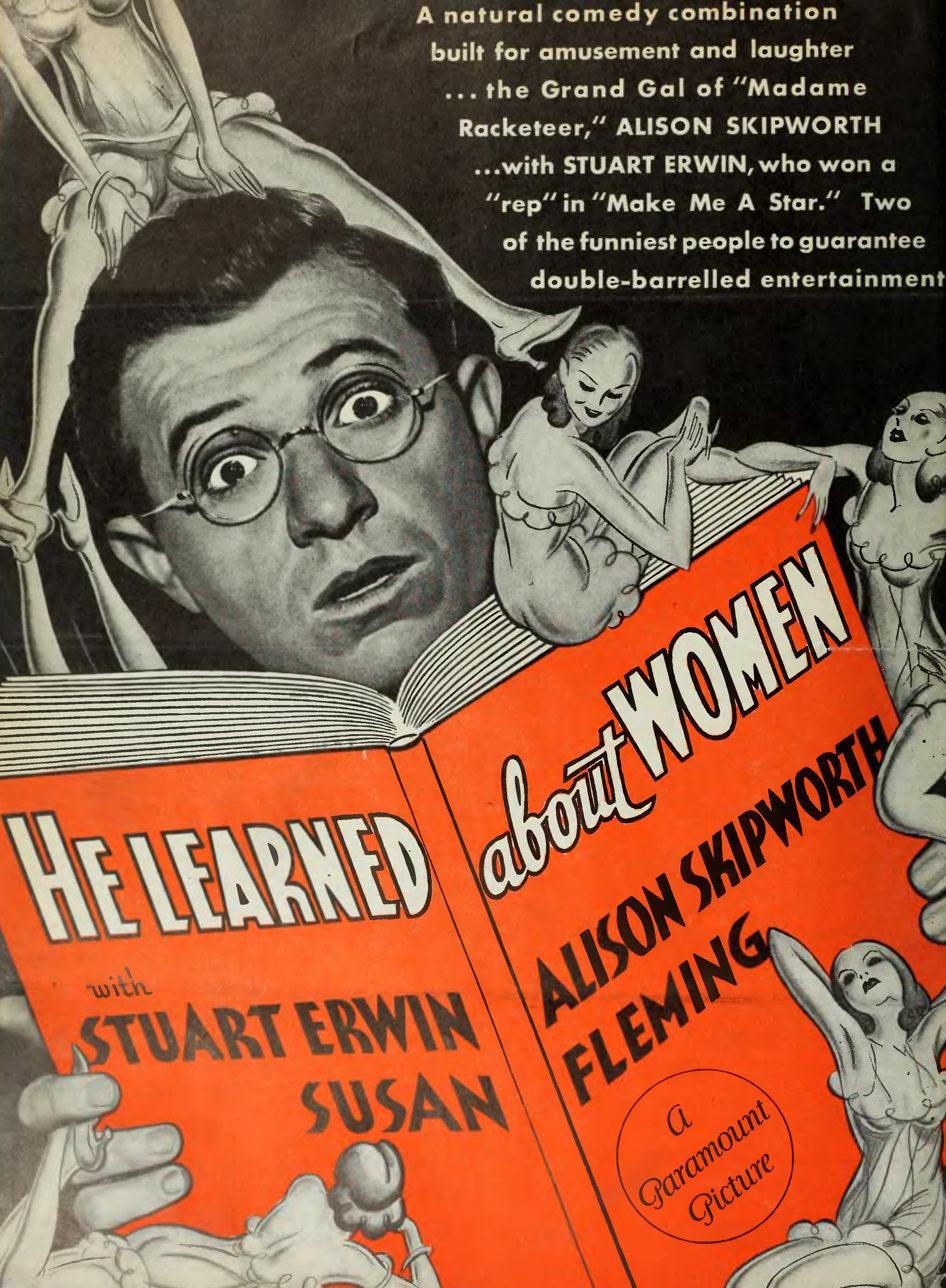
- Directed by: Lloyd Corrigan
- Screenplay by: Lloyd Corrigan; Harlan Thompson; Ray Harris
- Starring: Stuart Erwin; Susan Fleming; Alison Skipworth; Gordon Westcott; Grant Mitchell; Sidney Toler
- Cinematography: Charles Lang
- Music by: John Leipold
- Production company: Paramount Pictures
- Distributed by: Paramount Pictures
- Release date: March 2, 1933
- Running time: 68 minutes
- Country: United States
- Language: English

External image
- poster

He Learned About Women is a 1933 American pre-Code comedy film directed by Lloyd Corrigan and written by Lloyd Corrigan, Harlan Thompson and Ray Harris. The film stars Stuart Erwin, Susan Fleming, Alison Skipworth, Gordon Westcott, Grant Mitchell, and Sidney Toler. The film was released on November 4, 1932, by Paramount Pictures.

== Plot ==
"Story of youth who comes into fortune and prepares to see life."

"Alison Skipworth joins the cast as a would be swindler who doesn't quite succeed as she plans"

"a childlike playboy inherits the family fortune and gets himself a worldly butler who teaches him how to behave in a manner befitting his wealth and social station"

"A debonair butler shows his wealthy master how to be a sophisticated man of the world"

"When hermit Peter Potter Kendall II inherits fifty million dollars,
his attorney, James Drake, appoints Peter's valet, J. F. Wilson,
to teach Peter about the world, then leaves for Europe...."

== Cast ==
- Stuart Erwin as Peter Potter Kendall II
- Susan Fleming as Joan Allen
- Alison Skipworth as Mme. Vivienne Pompadour
- Gordon Westcott as Eddie Clifford
- Grant Mitchell as Appleby
- Sidney Toler as Wilson
- Tom Ricketts as Augus
- Claude King as Drake
- Gertrude Norman
- Gertrude Messenger
- Geneva Mitchell
- Dorothy Granger
- Irving Bacon as Stage Door Man
