= Olsen's Big Moment =

1933 film by Malcolm St. Clair

- Theatrical release poster
- Directed by: Malcolm St. Clair
- Screenplay by: Henry Johnson; James J. Tynan
- Story by: George Marshall
- Starring: El Brendel; Walter Catlett; Barbara Weeks; Susan Fleming; John Arledge; Joe Sawyer
- Cinematography: L. William O'Connell
- Music by: Samuel Kaylin
- Production company: Fox Film Corporation
- Distributed by: Fox Film Corporation
- Release date: November 17, 1933
- Running time: 70 minutes
- Country: United States
- Language: English

Olsen's Big Moment is a 1933 American pre-Code comedy film directed by Malcolm St. Clair and written by Henry Johnson and James J. Tynan. The film stars El Brendel, Walter Catlett, Barbara Weeks, Susan Fleming, John Arledge and Joe Sawyer. The film was released on November 17, 1933, by Fox Film Corporation.

== Cast ==
- El Brendel as Knute Olsen
- Walter Catlett as Robert Brewster III
- Barbara Weeks as Jane Van Allen
- Susan Fleming as Virginia West
- John Arledge as Harry Smith
- Joe Sawyer as 'Dapper' Danny Reynolds
