= Guild of Mercers' Scholars =

The Guild of Mercers' Scholars, established circa 1947 as Civic Guild of Old Mercers by ex-pupils of Mercers' School. It has the stated aim of encouraging former pupils of the Mercers' School to become Freemen of the City of London, and Liverymen: and to select, if possible, a Livery Company appropriate to their own trade or profession. The Guild is run along the same lines as a Livery Company.

When the Mercers' School closed in 1959 it was decided to extend membership to former pupils from other schools in the Mercers' Cluster. Membership is now open to pupils of the following schools; Abingdon School, Dauntsey's School, Hammersmith Academy, Madeley Academy, The Royal Ballet School, Mercers' School, Sandwell Academy, St Paul's Boys School, St Paul's Girls School and Thomas Telford School, Walsall Academy, and the Colleges of Richard Collyer and Peter Symonds.

In 2006 the Court responsible for the day-to-day running of the Guild, and with the blessing of the Mercers' Company, changed the name to the Guild of Mercers' Scholars, thereby widely reflecting the membership of the Guild in the 21st century.
