= Constance Cummings =

American-British actress (1910–2005)

Constance Cummings CBE
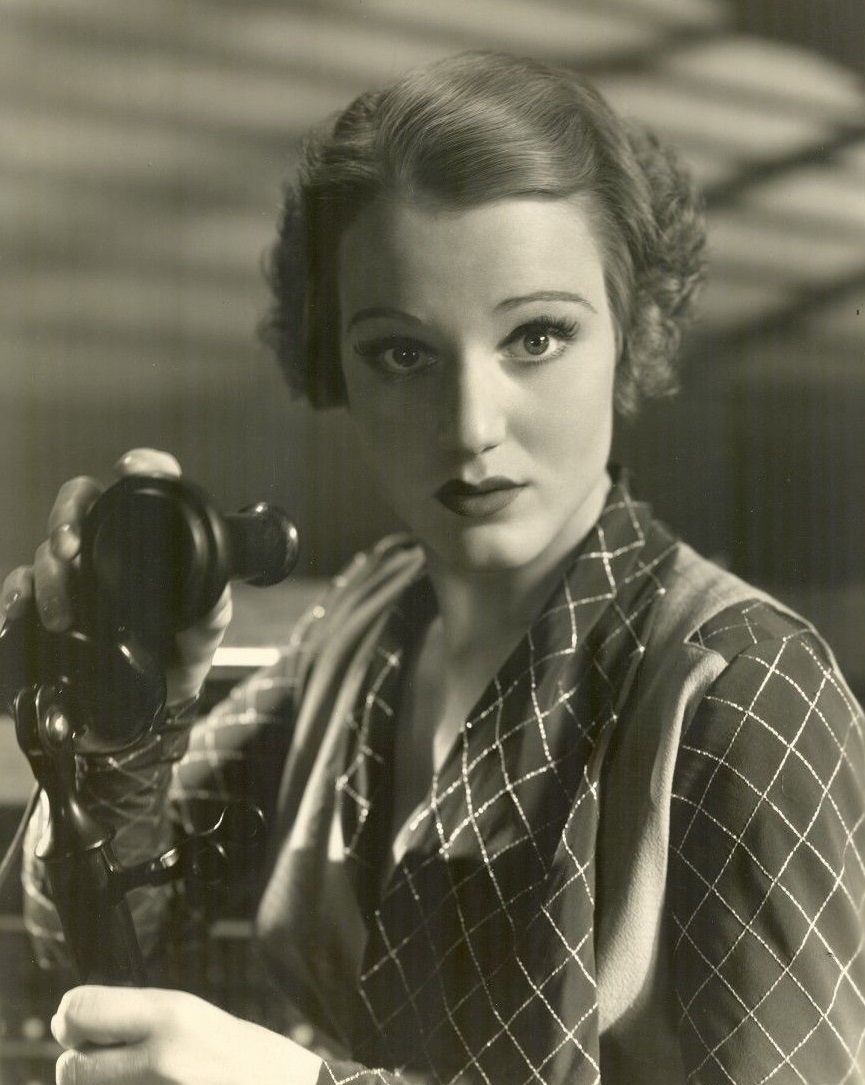
- Cummings in 1934
- Born: Constance Cummings Halverstadt; May 15, 1910; Seattle, Washington, U.S.
- Died: November 23, 2005 (aged 95); Wardington, Oxfordshire, England
- Occupation: Actress
- Years active: 1928–1999
- Spouse: Benn Levy (m. 1933; died 1973)
- Children: 2

Constance Cummings (May 15, 1910 – November 23, 2005) was an American-British actress with a career spanning over 50 years. She starred in films such as Movie Crazy (1932) and American Madness (1932).

== Early life ==
Cummings was born on May 15, 1910, in Seattle, Washington, the only daughter and younger child of Kate Logan (née Cummings), a concert soprano, and Dallas Vernon Halverstadt, a lawyer.

Cummings' parents separated when she was 10 years old, and she never saw her father again. She attended St. Nicholas Girls' School in Seattle.

== Career ==
The San Diego Stock Company gave Cummings her initial acting opportunity in a "walk-on part" playing a prostitute in a 1926 production of Seventh Heaven. She debuted on Broadway as a chorus girl, a member of the ensemble in Treasure Girl (1928) by the age of 18. While appearing on Broadway, she was discovered by Samuel Goldwyn, who brought her to Hollywood in 1931. Between 1931 and 1934, Cummings appeared in more than 20 films, including Movie Crazy opposite Harold Lloyd and American Madness directed by Frank Capra.

Cummings was married to playwright and screenwriter Benn Levy from July 3, 1933, until his death in 1973. As Levy was from the UK, Cummings moved there and continued acting in films and on the stage. Few of her films were hits in the U.S., but Blithe Spirit, adapted from the Noël Coward play, was popular. Levy wrote and directed films for Cummings, such as The Jealous God (1939); he also served in the UK Parliament from 1945 to 1950 as the Labour MP for Eton and Slough. They had a son and a daughter. She played Mary Tyrone in the Royal National Theatre's production of Eugene O'Neill's Long Day's Journey into Night opposite Laurence Olivier and later recreated the role for television. She took over the role of Martha in Edward Albee's Who's Afraid of Virginia Woolf? in its first London run.

== Recognition ==
In 1979, Cummings won the Tony Award for Best Actress in a Play for her performance as Emily Stilson in the drama Wings (1978–1979) (written by Arthur Kopit), a play about a former aviator (Stilson) who has suffered a stroke, from which she struggles to recover. This role also brought her Obie and Drama Desk awards and an Olivier Award nomination. In 1982, she was nominated for a Drama Desk Award for Outstanding Actress in a Play for her work in The Chalk Garden.

She received an Evening Standard Best Actress Award for her performance in Long Day's Journey into Night.

On January 1, 1974, Cummings, who resided in Britain for many decades until her death, was made a Commander of the Order of the British Empire (CBE) for her contributions to the British entertainment industry.

She was a committee member of the Royal Court Theatre and the Arts Council. She has a star in the Motion Pictures section on the Hollywood Walk of Fame at 6201 Hollywood Boulevard. It was dedicated on February 8, 1960.

== Death ==
Constance Cummings Levy died in Wardington, Oxfordshire, England, on November 23, 2005, aged 95, from natural causes.

== Acting credits ==
=== Filmography ===
- The Criminal Code (1931) as Mary Brady
- The Last Parade (1931) as Molly Pearson
- Lover Come Back (1931) as Connie Lee
- Traveling Husbands (1931) as Ellen Wilson
- The Guilty Generation (1931) as Maria Palmero
- Behind the Mask (1932) as Julie Arnold
- The Big Timer (1932) as Honey Baldwin
- Attorney for the Defense (1932) as Ruth Barry
- American Madness (1932) as Helen
- Movie Crazy (1932) as Mary Sears
- The Last Man (1932) as Marian
- Washington Merry-Go-Round (1932) as Alice
- Night After Night (1932) as Miss Jerry Healy
- The Billion Dollar Scandal (1933) as Doris Masterson
- The Mind Reader (1933) as Sylvia
- Heads We Go (1933) as Betty Smith / Dorothy Kay
- Channel Crossing (1933) as Marion Slade
- Broadway Through a Keyhole (1933) as Joan Whelan
- Looking for Trouble (1934) as Ethel Greenwood
- Glamour (1934) as Linda Fayne
- This Man Is Mine (1934) as Francesca Harper
- Remember Last Night? (1935) as Carlotta Milburn
- Seven Sinners (1936) as Caryl Fenton
- Strangers on Honeymoon (1936) as October
- Cyrano de Bergerac (1938, TV movie) as Roxane
- Busman's Honeymoon (1940) as Harriet Vane
- This England (1941) as Ann
- The Foreman Went to France (1942) as Anne Stafford, the American girl
- Blithe Spirit (1945) as Ruth Condomine
- Into the Blue (1950) as Mrs. Kate Fergusson
- Trial and Error (1953, TV movie) as Andrea
- John and Julie (1955) as Mrs. Davidson
- The Intimate Stranger (1956) as Kay Wallace
- The Trial of Mary Dugan (1957, TV movie) as Mary Dugan, known as Mona Tree
- Craig's Wife (1957, TV movie) as Harriet Craig
- The Battle of the Sexes (1960) as Angela Barrows
- Sammy Going South (1963) as Gloria van Imhoff
- In the Cool of the Day (1963) as Mrs. Nina Gellert
- Love Song (1985, TV movie) as Dame Philippa Hatchard
- Dead Man's Folly (1986, TV movie) as Amy Folliat
- The Understanding (1986, TV movie) as Acton (final film role)

=== Theatre ===
Year	Play	Character	Type	Comments
1926	Seventh Heaven	prostitute		Stage debut in Seattle, Washington
1928	Treasure Girl	chorus ensemble	Musical comedy	Broadway debut
1930	June Moon	Miss Rixey	Tin Pan Alley comedy	
1930	This Man's Town	Carrie	Drama	
1934	Sour Grapes			first appearance on London stage
1934	Accent on Youth	Linda Brown	Comedy	
1936	Young Madame Conti	Nella Conti	Melodrama	
1937	Madame Bovary Revival	Emma Bovary	Restoration Comedy	
1938	If I Were You	Nellie Blunt	Farce	
1938	Goodbye, Mr Chips	Katherine	Drama	
1939	The Jealous God			
1939–1940	Romeo and Juliet	Juliet	Tragedy	
1939–1940	Old Vic Theatre Season			
1939	Joan of Arc	Joan	Drama	
1939	The Good Natur'd Man	Miss Richland	Drama	
April 22, 1940	Shakespeare Birthday Festival			
1942	Skylark	Lydia	Drama	
1943	The Petrified Forest	Gabby	Drama	
1945	One Man Show	Racine Gardner	Drama	
1946	Clutterbuck		Comedy	
1948	Don't Listen Ladies		Farce	
1948	Happy with Either	Annaluise Klopps	Comedy	
1949	Before the Party	Laura	Comedy	
1950	Return to Tyassi			
1952	Winter's Journey			
1953	The Shrike		Drama	
1957	Lysistrata		Greek Comedy	
1957	The Rape of the Belt	Antiope		played at Piccadilly Theatre (1957), and then Martin Beck Theatre, NY (1960).
1961	J.B.	Sarah		
1962	Social Success			
1964	Huis Clos	Inez	Drama	
1965	Who's Afraid of Virginia Woolf?	Martha		
1966	Public and Confidential			
1967	Fallen Angels	Jane Banbury	Comedy	
1969	Hamlet	Gertrude	Shakespearean Tragedy	
1969	The Milk Train Doesn't Stop Here Anymore	Mrs Flora Goforth	Tragedy	
1970	The Visit	Claire Zachanassian	Tragi-comedy	
1971	Amphitryon 38	Leda	Greek Drama	
1971	Long Day's Journey into Night	Mary Tyrone	Royal Shakespeare Theatre, Stratford, UK with Laurence Olivier as James Tyrone	
1971–1972	National Theatre, London, Repertoire Season		Classical drama	
1972–1973	National Theatre, London, Repertoire Season			
1973	The Cherry Orchard	Madame Ranevsky		
1974	National Theatre, London, Repertoire Season			
1974	Children			
1979	Wings	Emily Stilson		Tony Award, Obie Award, Drama Desk Award
1979	National Theatre, London, Repertoire Season			
1980	Hay Fever		Comedy	
1981	The Golden Age			
1985	The Glass Menagerie			
1986	Fanny Kemble at Home			
1992	The Chalk Garden	Mrs St Maugham		Her last appearance on Broadway
1996–1999	Uncle Vanya	Maman		Her last stage appearance
