= The Range Feud =

1931 film

- Film poster
- Directed by: D. Ross Lederman
- Written by: Milton Krims; George H. Plympton
- Produced by: Irving Briskin
- Starring: Buck Jones; John Wayne; Susan Fleming
- Cinematography: Benjamin H. Kline
- Edited by: Maurice Wright
- Production company: Columbia Pictures
- Distributed by: Columbia Pictures
- Release date: December 2, 1931
- Running time: 64 minutes
- Country: United States
- Language: English

The Range Feud is a 1931 American pre-Code Western film directed by D. Ross Lederman for Columbia Pictures, that stars Buck Jones and John Wayne. Wayne biographer Ronald L. Davis referred to the film as the first in a collection of "cheap, assembly-line pictures" Wayne would make in the 1930s. It was remade in 1934 as a 15-chapter Buck Jones serial called The Red Rider (without Wayne).

== Plot ==
Clint Turner is arrested for the murder of his girlfriend Judy Walton's father. Clint falls under suspicion because the dead man was a rival rancher who had been an enemy of Clint's father years before. It is Sheriff Gordon's job to sort the whole thing out.

== Cast ==
- Buck Jones as Sheriff Buck Gordon
- John Wayne as Clint Turner
- Susan Fleming as Judy Walton
- Edward LeSaint as John Walton
- Will Walling as Dad Turner
- Wallace MacDonald as Hank
- Harry Woods as Vandall
- Frank Austin as Jed Biggers
- Jack Curtis as bartender Charlie (uncredited)
- Glenn Strange as cowhand Slim (uncredited)
- Al Taylor as cowhand Al (uncredited)
- Blackjack Ward as Deputy Jack (uncredited)

== See also ==
- John Wayne filmography
