= Arnold Wycombe Gomme =

British classical scholar (1886–1959)

Arnold Wycombe Gomme (16 November 1886 – 17 January 1959) was a British classical scholar, lecturer in Ancient Greek (1911–1945), Professor of Greek at the University of Glasgow (1946–1957), and Fellow of the British Academy (1947).

== Life ==
He was born to Laurence and Alice Gomme, noted folklore experts. He studied at Merchant Taylor's School and Trinity College, Cambridge. In 1911, he became assistant lecturer for Greek and Greek history at the University of Glasgow. In 1946, he became professor of ancient Greek at the same university.

In October 1914, he was commissioned in the Army's Interpreters' Corps. From November 1914 to November 1915, he served with the British Expeditionary Force (BEF) 8th Division in France. In June 1915, he was transferred to the Army Service Corps in France. From November 1915 to October 1916, was chief of MI-1c political and economic intelligence in Thessaloniki, Greece. He was invalided out of the Army. From March 1917 to January 1918, he worked for the Admiralty.

In 1917, he married Phyllis Emmerson. He was the father of Andor Gomme, Professor of English Literature and Architectural History at Keele University.

His major work was his commentary of the History of the Peloponnesian War, the famous work of the Athenian historian Thucydides. The first volume was published in 1945. The theft of a suitcase set back the next two volumes to 1956. At his death, the work was unfinished (he had left notes on Book 5). A. Andrewes and K.J. Dover wrote the final volumes.

Ernst Badian criticised Gomme's Commentary because Gomme assumed that the numerous speeches in Thucydides' work were verbatim reproductions of what was said, while the academic consensus is to consider the speeches to be inventions.

== Publications ==
- The Population of Athens in the Fifth and Fourth Centuries B.C. (Glasgow University Publications; XXVIII). Oxford: Blackwell, 1933.
- Essays in Greek History and Literature. Oxford: Basil Blackwell, 1937.
- Greece. Oxford: Oxford University Press, 1945.
- A Historical Commentary on Thucydides.
  - Vol. I: Introduction and Commentary on Book I. Oxford: Clarendon Press; Toronto: Oxford University Press, 1945.
  - Vols. II–III: The Ten Years' War (Books II–III and Books IV–V). Oxford: Clarendon Press; Toronto: Oxford University Press, 1956.
  - Vol. IV: Books V.25–VII (with A. Andrewes and K.J. Dover). Oxford: Clarendon Press, 1970.
  - Vol. V: Book VIII (with A. Andrewes and K.J. Dover). Oxford: Clarendon Press, 1981.
- The Greek Attitude to Poetry and History (Sather Classical Lectures; XXVII). Berkeley; Los Angeles: University of California Press, 1954.
- More Essays in Greek History and Literature, edited by David A. Campbell. Oxford: Blackwell, 1962.

== Bibliography ==
- Andrewes, A. "Arnold Wycombe Gomme†", Gnomon 32 (1960), 190–1.
- Ernst Badian, From Plataea to Potidaea, Studies in the History and Historiography of the Pentecontaetia, Baltimore/London, Johns Hopkins University Press, 1993. .
- Kitto, H.D.F. "Arnold Wycombe Gomme: [Obituary]", The Journal of Hellenic Studies, Vol. 79. (1959), pp. 1–2.
