= Broadway Through a Keyhole =

1933 film

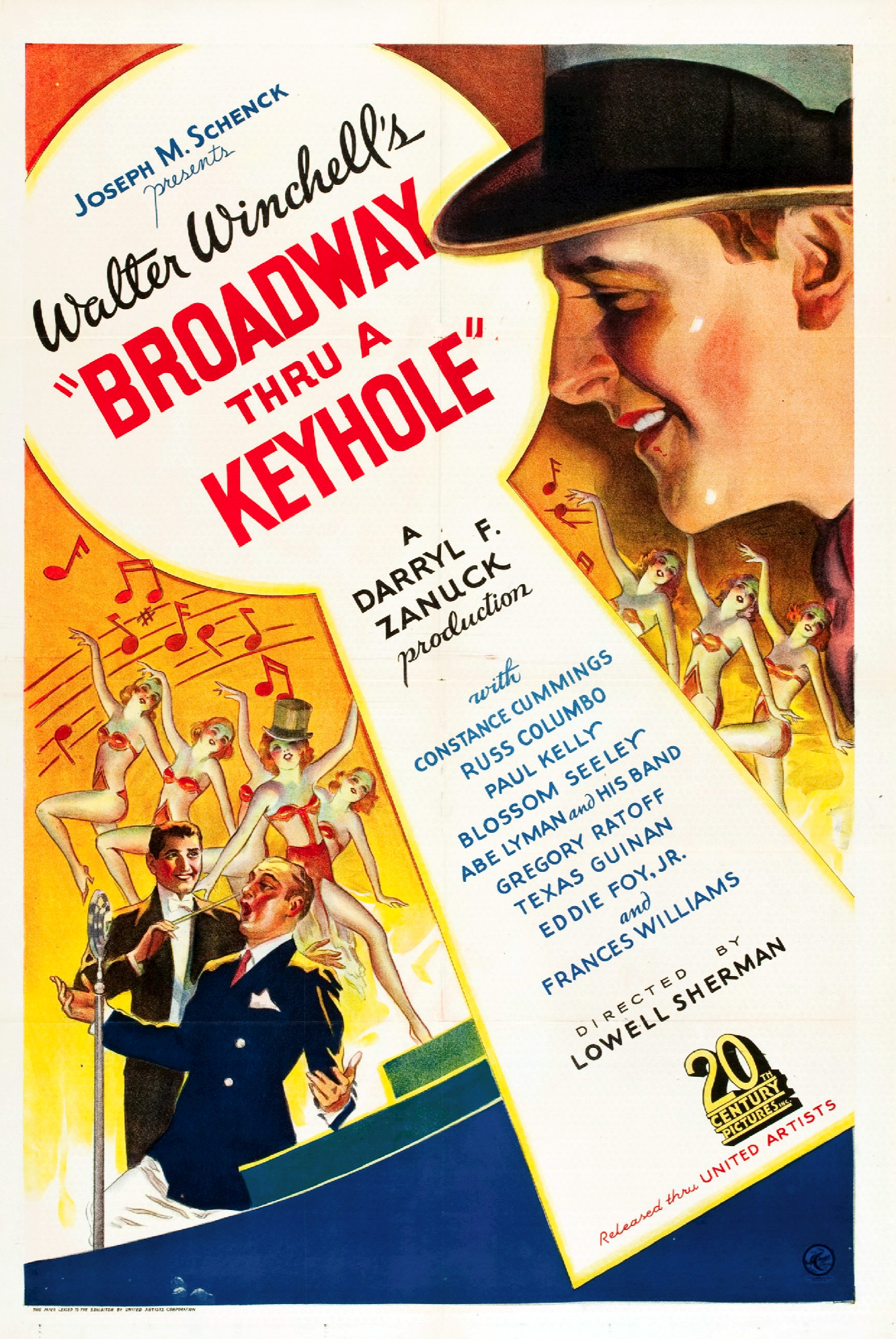
- Film poster
- Directed by: Lowell Sherman
- Written by: C. Graham Baker; Gene Towne (screenplay)
- Story by: Walter Winchell
- Produced by: William Goetz; Raymond Griffith
- Music by: Alfred Newman
- Production company: Twentieth Century Pictures
- Distributed by: United Artists
- Release date: November 2, 1933
- Running time: 90 min.
- Country: United States
- Language: English

Broadway Through a Keyhole, also billed as Broadway Thru a Keyhole, is a 1933 American pre-Code musical film produced by Twentieth Century Pictures and released by United Artists.

New York City speakeasy proprietress Texas Guinan appears as a fictionalized version of herself in the film (this was her last film role -- Guinan died three days after the film's opening.) The film also features early appearances by Lucille Ball, Ann Sothern, and Susan Fleming. The film is based on an original story by Broadway columnist Walter Winchell.

== Plot ==
Racketeer Frank Rocci is smitten with Joan Whelan, a dancer at Tex Kaley's famous Broadway night spot. He uses his influence to help her get a starring role in the show, hoping that it will also get Joan to fall in love with him. After scoring a hit, Joan accepts Frank's marriage proposal, more out of gratitude than love. The situation gets even stickier when she falls for a handsome band leader during a trip to Florida. Can she tell Frank she's in love with someone else?

== Cast ==
- Constance Cummings as Joan Whelan
- Russ Columbo as Clark Brian
- Paul Kelly as Frank Rocci
- Blossom Seeley as Sybil Smith
- Gregory Ratoff as Max Mefoofski
- Texas Guinan as Tex Kaley
- Abe Lyman as Orchestra Leader
- Hugh O'Connell as Chuck Haskins
- Hobart Cavanaugh as Peanuts Dinwiddie
- Frances Williams as Frances Williams
- Eddie Foy, Jr. as Joan's partner
- George Mann as George Mann - Columnist
- C. Henry Gordon as Tim Crowley
- William Burress as Thomas Barnum
- Helen Jerome Eddy as Esther
- Lucille Ball as Chorine (uncredited)
- Susan Fleming as Chorine (uncredited)
- Ann Sothern as Singer (uncredited)
