= Society of Architectural Historians of Great Britain =

British learned society

The Society of Architectural Historians of Great Britain (SAHGB) is a learned society for people interested in the history of architecture.

== Purpose ==
The Society exists to encourage interest in the history of architecture, to enable the exchange and discussion of ideas related to this. The Society has no official location and its activities cover the United Kingdom. The Society also represents the interests of UK architectural history to governmental and non-governmental bodies within the education and heritage fields. The Society specifically avoids conservation issues.

Architectural History is the main journal of the society. In February 2026, the Society formally announced the journal had moved to an Open Access format under a new publisher, Ubiquity Press, following Cambridge University Press choosing to not renew the existing publishing contract. There is also a biannual print magazine for members. The Society also published five research registers.

== History ==
The foundation of the Society was prompted in 1955 by Turpin Bannister in discussion with Frank Jenkins, a British architect and scholar who worked with Bannister at the University of Illinois in the United States. Initially it was conceived as being a chapter of the American Society of Architectural Historians partly because Bannister had been a founder-member in 1940. However, it was decided in 1956 that the Society should be independent. The early members were mainly architects and teachers. The Chairmen of the first meetings were Bruce Allsopp and William A. Singleton, the latter affiliated with the York Institute of Architectural Study.

Andor Gomme was an architectural historian and chairman of the Society of Architectural Historians of Great Britain, whose journal, Architectural History, he edited for many years.

== See also ==
- Royal Institute of British Architects
- Society of Architectural Historians
- SAHANZ
