= Alice Gomme =

British folklorist (1853–1938)

- Born: Alice Bertha Merck; 4 January 1853; London, England
- Died: 5 January 1938 (aged 85); London, England
- Occupation: Folklorist
- Organization: English Folk Cookery Association
- Notable work: The Traditional Games of England, Scotland and Ireland; Children's Singing Games: with the Tunes to Which they are Sung
- Spouse: George Laurence Gomme
- Relatives: Arthur Allan Gomme; Arnold Wycombe Gomme

Alice Bertha Gomme, Lady Gomme (née Merck; 4 January 1853, London – 5 January 1938, London), was a leading British folklorist, and a pioneer in the study of children's games, and the first president of Florence White's English Folk Cookery Association.

== Life ==
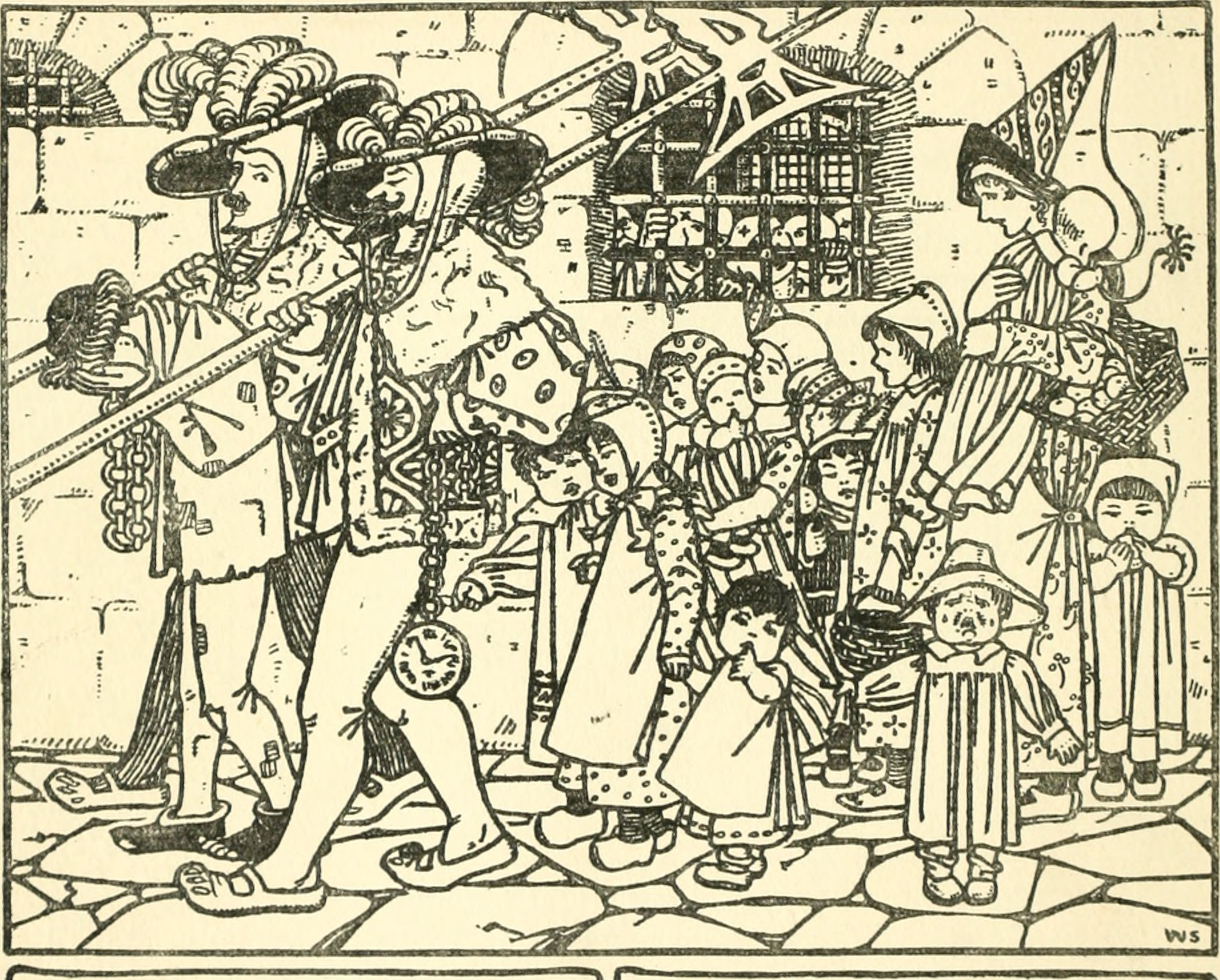
An illustration from Children's Singing Games, 1900

Gomme was the daughter of Charles Merck, a master tailor, and Elizabeth, his wife. On March 31, 1875, she married George Laurence Gomme (1853-1916), who was himself an important figure in folklore studies. The couple had seven sons, born between 1876 and 1891. One of these, Arthur Allan Gomme, would, like his father, become president of the Folklore Society. Another, Arnold Wycombe Gomme, was a noted classical scholar.

When the Folklore Society was founded in 1878, Gomme and her husband were among the founder members; and she would be a leading figure in its activities for the rest of her life.

Her major work is The Traditional Games of England, Scotland and Ireland (two vols., 1894 and 1898), containing descriptions of some 800 children's games, collected with the help of seventy-six correspondents. Among other works on the same subject was Children's Singing Games (two vols., 1894) and several later works in collaboration with her husband or with Cecil Sharp.

Her Children's Singing Games: with the Tunes to Which they are Sung was also notable for being one of the finest illustrated Arts & Crafts books produced by the Birmingham School of Art. Another pioneering interest was folk cookery; and she was elected as the first president of the English Folk Cookery Association in 1928. Beyond these specialist areas, her articles on folklore show a wide variety of interests.
