= Lover Come Back (1931 film) =

1931 film

- Directed by: Erle C. Kenton
- Screenplay by: Dorothy Howell
- Story by: Helen Topping Miller; Robert T. Shannon
- Produced by: Harry Cohn
- Starring: Constance Cummings; Jack Mulhall; Betty Bronson; Jameson Thomas
- Cinematography: Gene Havlick
- Edited by: Joseph Walker
- Production company: Columbia Pictures
- Distributed by: Columbia Pictures
- Release date: June 16, 1931
- Running time: 68 minutes
- Country: United States
- Language: English

Lover Come Back is a 1931 Columbia Pictures pre-Code drama directed by Erle C. Kenton from a script by Dorothy Howell. The story was based on a McCall's magazine feature by Helen Topping Miller.

== Plot ==
After the man she hoped to marry is lured away by a sultry vamp, a dejected stenographer gives in to her boss's advances and moves into his New York City apartment. Of course, soon the sultry vamp is after her boss. Complications abound.

== Cast ==
- Constance Cummings as Connie Lee
- Jack Mulhall as Tom Evans
- Betty Bronson as Vivian March
- Jameson Thomas as Yates
- Fred Santley as Schultzy (as Fredric Santley)
- John Mack as Henry (as Jack Mack)
- Kathryn Givney as Mrs. March
- Loretta Sayers as Loretta - Secretary
- Susan Fleming as Susan - Secretary
