= The Story of Shirley Yorke =

1948 British film by Maclean Rogers

- Directed by: Maclean Rogers
- Written by: Kathleen Butler; A.R. Rawlinson; Maclean Rogers
- Based on: The Case of Lady Camber by Horace Annesley Vachell
- Produced by: Ernest G. Roy
- Starring: Derek Farr; Dinah Sheridan; Margaretta Scott; John Robinson
- Cinematography: Geoffrey Faithfull
- Edited by: Ted Richards
- Music by: George Melachrino
- Production company: Nettlefold Films
- Distributed by: Butcher's Film Service
- Release date: 4 July 1949 (UK)
- Running time: 92 minutes
- Country: United Kingdom
- Language: English

The Story of Shirley Yorke is a 1948 British second feature ('B') drama film directed by Maclean Rogers and starring Derek Farr, Dinah Sheridan and Margaretta Scott. It was written by Kathleen Butler, A.R. Rawlinson and Rogers based on the 1915 play The Case of Lady Camber by Horace Annesley Vachell.

== Plot ==
When a nobleman's wife dies during an operation, nurse Shirley Yorke finds herself accused of poisoning, when it is found that she and the peer were formerly lovers.

== Cast ==
- Derek Farr as Gerald Ryton
- Dinah Sheridan as Shirley Yorke
- Margaretta Scott as Alison Gwynne
- John Robinson as Dr. Bruce Napier
- Barbara Couper as Muriel Peach
- Beatrix Thomson as Lady Camber
- Ian McLean as Dr. Harris
- Jack Raine as Stansfield Yorke
- Lesley Osmond as Jennifer Ware
- Valentine Dyall as Edward Holt
- Eleanor Summerfield as Doris
- Bruce Seton as Captain Sharp
- Neville Brook as Professor Slufter
- Vincent Holman as Bates
- Olive Kirby as Irene
- Shirley Quentin as Night Sister
- Arthur Mullard as Police Constable
- Charles Hawtrey as Major Markham

== Production ==
It was made at the Nettlefold Studios in Walton-on-Thames. Art direction was by Charles Gilbert.

== Reception ==
The Monthly Film Bulletin wrote: "This novelettish story, in which the plot owes overmuch to that indispensable adjunct (to some writers at least), the long arm of coincidence, seems to take far too long in reaching its anticipated climax. But what might otherwise have seemed a somewhat boring film is redeemed by the united efforts of the entire cast, each member of which merits the highest praise. Lovely Dinah Sheridan is calmly competent as Shirley, and Derek Farr succeeds in the difficult task of conveying the character of an unmitigated cad without over-acting thepart."

Kine Weekly wrote: "The picture, unfolded in biographical form, wisely scorns pretence and sticks to the sturdy formula of the best-seller novelette. The good characters are very, very good and the bad are shocking, but although the odds always seem to be against the former and they frequently bring tears to the eyes of their supporters, virtue triumphs in the end. The hearty battle, conducted with showmanship against a wide variety of backgrounds, provides cast-iron popular entertainment.

Picturegoer gave the film 2/4 stars writing: "Those who like their entertainment wholehearted and in full emotional colours will find this very much to their taste."

Picture Show wrote: "Derek Farr makes his thorough-going bounder convincing, and Dinah Sheridan give a sympathetic portrayal of the well-born but penniless nurse-heroine. John Robinson shows promise as the doctor with whom she eventually finds happiness, while Margaretta Scott as her hospital-matron friend and Barbara Couper as the murdered woman's jealous cousin give good performances."
