= Lord Camber's Ladies =

1932 film

- Opening title
- Directed by: Benn W. Levy
- Written by: Benn W. Levy; Edwin Greenwood; Gilbert Wakefield; Horace Annesley Vachell
- Based on: The Case of Lady Camber; 1915 play by Horace Annesley Vachell
- Produced by: Alfred Hitchcock
- Starring: Gerald du Maurier; Gertrude Lawrence; Benita Hume; Nigel Bruce
- Cinematography: James Wilson
- Production company: British International Pictures
- Distributed by: Wardour Films
- Release date: 28 October 1932
- Running time: 80 minutes
- Language: English

Lord Camber's Ladies is a 1932 British drama film directed by Benn W. Levy, produced by Alfred Hitchcock, and starring Gerald du Maurier, Gertrude Lawrence, Benita Hume, and Nigel Bruce.

== Plot ==
An aristocrat marries a singer, but then tries to murder her when he falls in love with another woman.

== Cast ==
- Gerald du Maurier as Doctor Napier
- Gertrude Lawrence as Lady Camber
- Benita Hume as Janet King
- Nigel Bruce as Lord Camber
- Clare Greet as Peach
- A. Bromley Davenport as Sir Bedford Slufter
- Betty Norton as Hetty
- Harold Meade as Ainley
- Hugh E. Wright as Old Man
- Hal Gordon as Stage Manager
- Molly Lamont as Actress

== Production background ==
This is the only film Alfred Hitchcock produced but did not direct. It was later dismissed by him as a BIP quota quickie: "a poison thing. I gave it to Benn Levy to direct". It is an adaptation of the 1915 play The Case of Lady Camber by Horace Annesley Vachell. The play had previously been filmed in 1915 by Walter West.
