= Benn Levy =

British writer and politician (1900–1973)

Benn Wolfe Levy
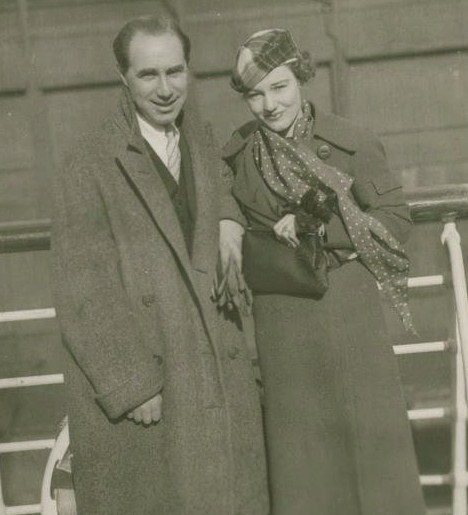
- Benn Levy and Constance Cummings in 1935

Member of Parliament for Eton and Slough
- In office 26 July 1945 – 3 February 1950
- Preceded by: Constituency established
- Succeeded by: Fenner Brockway

Personal details
- Born: 7 March 1900
- Died: 7 December 1973 (aged 73)
- Party: Labour
- Spouse: Constance Cummings (m. 1933)
- Children: 2

Benn Wolfe Levy (7 March 1900 – 7 December 1973) was a Labour Party Member of Parliament in the House of Commons (1945–1950), and a successful playwright. He was educated at Repton School and University College, Oxford and served in uniform in both World Wars.

== Playwright and parliamentarian ==
Before entering politics, Levy was a successful playwright and screenwriter. He was the dialogue writer for Blackmail (1929); directed by Alfred Hitchcock, it was the first British sound film. Later, he wrote the adapted screenplay for James Whale's macabre horror film The Old Dark House (1932) in collaboration with R. C. Sherriff, based on the novel Benighted (1927) by J. B. Priestley. Levy directed one film, Lord Camber's Ladies (1932), which was the only film produced by Hitchcock which he did not himself direct.

Levy was first elected at the 1945 general election, for the Eton and Slough constituency, and stood down at the 1950 general election. Politically, Levy was on the left of the Labour Party and later became an active member of the Campaign for Nuclear Disarmament. As a sympathiser with the Zionist movement, he also opposed Foreign Secretary Ernest Bevin over Bevin's policies towards Palestine and Israel.

As an MP, Levy made an unsuccessful effort to abolish theatrical censorship in Britain, and towards the end of his life, he was the principal author of a report opposing the arguments for censorship made by Lord Longford, the anti-pornography campaigner.

He was married for more than 40 years to the American-born screen and stage actress Constance Cummings; the couple had one daughter and one son.

Levy's papers are held at the University of Sussex library.

== Credits ==
=== Plays ===
Plays written by Levy:

- This Woman Business (1925)
- Mud and Treacle (1928)
- A Man with Red Hair (1928)
- Mrs Moonlight (1928)
- Art and Mrs Bottle (1929)
- Topaz (1930)
- Ever Green (1930)
- Springtime for Henry (1931)
- Hollywood Holiday with John van Druten (1931)
- The Devil Passes (1932)
- Young Madame Conti with Hubert Griffiths (1936)
- Madame Bovary (1937)
- If I Were You (1938)
- The Jealous God (1939)
- Clutterbuck (1946)
- Return to Tyassi (1950)
- Cupid and Psyche (1952)
- The Rape of the Belt (1957)

=== Selected filmography ===
Director

- Lord Camber's Ladies (1932) produced by Alfred Hitchcock

Screenwriter

- The Hate Ship (1929)
- The Informer (1929)
- Waterloo Bridge (1931), directed by James Whale
- Devil and the Deep (1932)
- The Old Dark House (1932), directed by James Whale
- Topaze (1933) directed by Harry d'Abbadie d'Arrast
- Unfinished Symphony (1934) directed by Anthony Asquith
- The Dictator (1935) directed by Victor Saville

Parliament of the United Kingdom
New constituency	Member of Parliament for Eton and Slough; 1945–1950	Succeeded by Fenner Brockway
