= Florence White (writer) =

English food writer (1863–1940)

- Born: June 20, 1863; Peckham, London, England
- Died: March 12, 1940 (aged 76); Fareham, Hampshire, England
- Occupation: Food writer
- Writing career
- Language: English

Florence White (20 June 1863 – 12 March 1940) was an English food writer who established the English Folk Cookery Association in 1928, founded the Good Food Register in 1935, and published books on cookery and other domestic subjects. Her cookery book Good Things in England remains in print.

== Early life ==
Florence White was born in Peckham, the fifth and youngest child of Richard White, a lace buyer for Copestake, Moore, Crampton & Co., a firm in the City of London, and his second wife, Harriet Jane Thrikell. Many on Richard White's side of the family had worked as innkeepers. Florence White's mother died on June 2, 1869, when Florence was almost seven. Richard White then married Ann Pope, White's stepmother, with whom she had a fraught, difficult relationship. The family lived initially in Peckham but had moved to Lewisham shortly before Thirkell's death. Writing of her mother in her autobiography, White noted that "there was never a happier, lovelier home as long as [Mother] was alive. The love she was so rich in not only made the fire in the kitchen, but warmed all our hearts."

As a young child, White was blinded in one eye while playing with a spinning-top and subsequently suffered from frail health, including neuralgic headaches and weakness that adversely affected her ability to prepare for Girton College, University of Cambridge, entrance exams. Due to her father's financial difficulties brought on by an economic depression in the late 1870s, White and her sister, Kate, were removed from school after Christmas in 1877, ending White's formal education. Kate took work as a daily governess while Florence became the White family's maid-of-all-work and her younger siblings' governess. It was from this time forward that White learned to cook.

The White family moved again in 1878 to a semi-detached house in Oxford Terrace, South Beddington, with no room for a servant. Again, White recalled, she "was set to work to teach [her] stepbrothers and sister, do the cooking and scullery work, and also a certain amount of upstair bedroom work." White described herself as "a veritable Cinderella." The "proof lay in the fact that an old man who came to the backdoor selling bloaters [Bloater (herring)], oranges, and nuts, would frequently give me something for myself, and the old sweet-woman who came around on Saturdays selling home-made bull's-eyes [Humbug (sweet)] would always give me a screw of peppermint balls, with a 'Bless your sweet face, darling.'"

During this period, Kate and Florence also decided to expand their teaching to create a small, fee-paying school.

Out of necessity, White learned to both economize but also cook with ingenuity and creativity. She noted in her autobiography that she made her family a hot-bed of garden rubbish to grow vegetables, and that their being "frightfully poor" necessitated her care in the kitchen where she "learnt to make savoury dishes out of very little, and not to waste anything. At that time we could get a sheep's head and pluck from our butcher for ninepence. This included the head with tongue and brains, the heart, lights, and liver. A very good bargain. We always had this once a week, the lights being afterwards boiled up and mixed with mash for the chickens." White, always an avid walker, likewise took full advantage of the edibles that grew in the lanes and hedgerows in their vicinity, particularly the blackberries that White used to make puddings, pies, and jam.

Equally important to White's foundation and interest in food were two paternal aunts: Harriet (b.1809), and Louisa (or Louie), who ran the Red Lion Hotel in Fareham after White's grandfather died in 1854. White joined her aunts at the age of 18 where she was introduced to traditional cookery, or what she described as the "good epicurean country-house cookery which had been handed down in the family from mother to daughter since the days of Queen Elizabeth." Because Harriet was suffering from an inoperable tumour and Louisa from creeping paralysis, White's responsibility was to assist in her aunts' care but also to help in the Red Lion kitchen, well-known for serving dishes that were still made on an open range where the food could be roasted in front of the fire. It was during her time at the Red Lion that White further enhanced her cookery skills, learning to paunch hares, and draw, truss and roast poultry.

== Professional life ==
She later held jobs including school teaching and shop-keeping, before writing her first book, Easy Dressmaking (1891). This was published by the Singer Sewing Machine Company and sold 110,000 copies over eight years. For much of her life, White worked as a journalist as well, including a period at the Edinburgh Evening News where she was the only woman on a staff of twenty men, and as such recalled in her autobiography the days "when Mrs Johnstone edited Tait's Magazine, in the time of Sir Walter Scott". White told her colleagues that she was " 'no lady' but just an ordinary journalist as any of [them]" and was allowed almost unlimited scope in topics to write about. Such freedom led to her continued interest in British Foodways as well as a growing interest in working-class girls and diet.

White initially investigated a none-too-rare situation for her time period: A girl's mother died, leaving the child five shillings a week to support herself. By taking in another girl who paid three shillings sixpence in rent, the remaining shillings and pence were left to cover their clothing, fuel, and food. Neither child knew how to buy or cook food, and so they survived on "bread and dripping, stewed tea, cheap pickles, and an occasional kipper or sausage, and porridge, anything to satisfy their appetites. No wonder they were ill" White concluded.

Periods of her own ill health frequently interrupted White's work, but she often used convalescence to devote more time to understanding cookery and foodways, including in the late 1800s when a doctor prescribed a sea voyage. To afford it, White accompanied two young children to India to pay for her own voyage on top of a small wage. Another sickness resulted in White's brother and sister giving White an allowance, freeing her to convalesce in Paris where after she was stronger, she sought professional culinary training by attending Henri-Paul Pellaprat's and Marthe Distel's recently opened Le Cordon Bleu. "I avoided classes for ladies," White stated bluntly in her autobiography. "I wanted the real thing, and got it."

White returned to England and determined on a course of study that would have profound implications for her career: She treated where she was living with cousins in Priest Hutton, City of Lancaster, as if it were as worthy of the same scrutiny she had given to abodes abroad, particularly as the place related to historic and regional foodways. White purchased a map and compass and drew a five mile radius around Lancaster, Lancashire to immerse herself in her home.

At the Lancaster Public Library, White read the 1806 Beauties of England (likely part of the series The Beauties of England and Wales) which led her to Gervase Markham's English Huswife (or Housewife), a 1688 edition of the book that White saved her money to purchase. Her "interest in the historic side of cookery dates" from the "result of reading" the two volumes together, White wrote. She explained how folk history, especially fashion and architecture, informed her understanding of food: "I knew the houses in which they lived and how they were furnished and the clothes they wore--but what did they eat? From this time food and cookery meant much more to me than preparing meals. It meant clothing the dry bones of history with flesh and blood, and connecting skeletons thus clothed with the health of social life."

Particularly important to White's research was the nearby sixteenth-century manor, Borwick Hall, where she spent time exploring the house and garden. She was also fascinated with the history of Sizergh Castle and Garden in nearby Helsington, Cumbria, where she found an old Alembic that turned her "attention to the use of herbs and flowers as food". White began a note-book that would become her 1934 book, Flowers as Food.

White supported herself by writing for the local press where she detailed her discoveries and theories of the yet-to-be named discipline of foodways. The money earned from these ventures resulted in White gaining a bit more financial security and thus leaving her cousins to set out on her own, first to Carnforth, then Warton, Lancaster, later Melling, and Kendal. In 1909, White returned to Edinburgh, taking up residence with her friend Elsie at No. 8, Walker Street where she found herself in the "midst of suffragists", although White identified more as a Fabian than as a suffragist. Her earlier, personal experience of living on "Round About a Pound a Week" (the title of Maud Pember Reeves' and Charlotte Wilson's study of London poverty supported by the Fabian Society's Women's Group), gave White an immediate understanding of the struggles of many people, particularly women charged with feeding large families. It was class, more so than gender, that frequently animated White. In fact, she found it astonishing that in Scotland, a Presbyterian country, so many women had given over the importance of Sabbath worship to, in her words, the "idolatry of the parliamentary vote".

While back in Edinburgh, White again wrote for the Edinburgh Evening News (likely freelancing), at one point publishing a leader article arguing that if Britain were again to be involved in a continental war, the crux of the situation would revolve around the food question, "and the woman who could make a meal for two out of the allowance for one would be worth her weight in gold. Of course the sub-editors and reporters jeered at me, but so it turned out," White reflected, as the nation entered World War One.

White became Matron of the Scottish Girls' Friendly Society Lodge where until March, 1916, she oversaw the kitchen as well as marketing. She taught her charges cookery in spite of war and food shortages. "During the winter," White wrote in her autobiography, "we had porridge every day; during the summer a home-grown salad such as mustard and cress, or a bought salad consisting of radishes, tomatoes, and spring onions. For relish we had scrambled eggs, hot or cold bacon, fresh Soused herring, fried potatoes, fish cakes, sausage and potato cakes, finnan haddock, Kippers, and above all home-made Potted meat or fish. We had Marmalade all year round."

In spite of White's success, someone spread a rumour that White drank and took drugs. Even though she was exonerated, White resigned from the Lodge to begin working in England on and off as a domestic servant, including looking after a succession of Roman Catholic Priests and then as cook-housekeeper for a women students' hall of residence in Kensington. Although she had some satisfaction with the work, using her employment as a time to indulge in "a number of interesting experiments in cookery," White's health suffered from the labour.

In December, 1921, age 58, White left domestic service to become a full-time food journalist. She rented a basement Bedsit in Chelsea, London for eight shillings a week, helped by an allowance from her brother and sister. White contended in her autobiography that "necessity" made her into a food journalist. She was angered by the what she saw as the abuse that English cooks (women cooks) as well as English cookery suffered in the press, along with the abuse of English hotels. She was determined to become "unceasing in [her] efforts to support all four: English cooks, English cookery, English hotels, and our splendid Victorian women." In White's calculation, the only other person championing English cookery and its delights at the time was Charles Cooper, author of The English Table in History and Literature (1929) and editor of two short-lived periodicals, The Epicure and The Table.

From 1921 to her final years, White built her own library of cookery books by relying on second-hand booksellers while she also took up extensive journalism, including articles for The Times on Isabella Beeton and William Kitchiner, and for The Spectator where she considered herself "very good friends" of its editors, St. Loe Strachey and J. B. Atkins. The editor of The Westminster Gazette likewise commissioned White to contribute a weekly article on "Household Catering". Her articles also appeared in the Edinburgh Review, Glasgow Herald, and The Caterer, among other publications.

Easy Dressmaking was followed by Good Things in England (1932), a traditional cookery book which remains in print. Then came Flowers as Food (1934), and an autobiography, A Fire in the Kitchen: The Autobiography of a Cook (1938). Good English Food, Local and Regional was published posthumously in 1952.

In later years, White returned to Fareham and established a cookery and domestic training school there. She died in Fareham, Hampshire, aged 76.

White's importance rests largely with her efforts to educate her readers about the importance of English culinary heritage.

== English Folk Cookery Association and Good Food Register ==
White was motivated to form the English Folk Cookery Association in 1928, as a more formal means to protect English Foodways and promote, rather than denigrate, English cooks and cookery. She took significant umbrage at articles such as one penned by Horace Annesley Vachell who wrote in "To Dine Properly: Not a Matter of Money but Knowledge" that "our national food, as you find it in cottages, hotels (with rarest exceptions), and in nearly all middle-class homes, is a national disaster." Vachell went on to suggest that "ten days, without the option of a fine, would be the least punishment inflicted upon any house wife who dared tamper" with recipes that would be created by the State and overseen by an appointed Minister of the National Kitchens. White acknowledged that many women did not know how to cook or cook well, and she made many efforts to enhance cookery as an honorable profession. Nonetheless, she also knew from extensive travel and research that the nation offered an abundance of wonderful foods as well as highly skilled women as well as men who created them.

White took inspiration from France in particular, which routinely honored and promoted its culinarians. When the village of Camembert put up a memorial to Marie Harel, the (presumed) creator of Camembert cheese, White grew indignant. "Why the devil don't we write up our own men and women?" White wrote in her autobiography. "Who invented Stilton cheese? Why isn't a memorial put up to her?" Alarmed at people's ignorance as to what "English food" meant "beyond roast beef, Yorkshire pudding, and Christmas Plum pudding," White increasingly honed her focus and her mission to locate and not only write about the origins of Stilton cheese, Melton Mowbray pork pie, and Bath's Sally Lunn bun, but to compile recipes for such foods from all over the British Isles. "Every place I visited I found had, or used to have, some local delicacy," White wrote, and so she began "to make a gastronomic map of England," an idea that she then submitted to a local newspaper in 1927, although "it was turned down." White noted that shortly after this rejection, a Sunday English paper "wrote eulogizing a French gastronomic map which had been prepared by a cook, and, of course, English cooks were given a slap in the face. 'No English cook would take the trouble to do it.'"

Undeterred, White published a query in the Times, calling on interested parties to join together and form an English Folk Cookery Association (EFCA). White was already a member of the English Folklore Society (EFS), and she envisioned her new Association might act as a link between EFS and the Association of French Chefs in London (Association Culinaire Française)--a group which rejected White's suggestion of such a link. Nonetheless White proceeded with forming the English Folk Cookery Association.

By 1932, Lady Alice Gomme acted as the EFCA as president. St. John Wright was secretary. The owner of a Devonshire hotel, The Round House, Wright promoted English specialties, including Suffolk sweet cured ham, sweet pickled peaches, Ringwood fruit-cake, Cumberland rum butter, rum-flavored cherry jam, as well as local Devonshire and Cornish delicacies. St. John Wright was also associated with luxury London hotel restaurants including the Savoy Hotel, Claridge's, Berkeley, and most importantly, Simpson's-in-the-Strand where he organized monthly English Folk Cookery dinners. Numerous people responded to White's requests for family recipes, regional recipes, and distinctive specialties that White feared would go extinct. The EFCA thus was able to produce in 1935 the Good Food Register, a directory primarily of small inns and teashops that offered excellent English cooking and regional products. This was edited by White and later retitled Where Shall We Eat or Put Up? Those who joined the EFCA for one guinea were given a copy of the Register and urged to travel widely, visit the selected eateries, and improve the Register by offering tips and new recommendations. "No paid advertisements of any kind are taken," White explained in a Letter to the Editor in The Observer. "The book belongs to the travelling public, and has been compiled solely for their benefit" as a means, she continued, to compel hotelkeepers to improve their meals and their standards. White was in fact responding to a robust conversation among readers about the deplorable state of food in English hotels, including one from a correspondent, F. D. T., who questioned why English hotel keepers served meals that were often "expensive, unappetizing, badly-cooked, distressingly the same, and served with that 'take it or leave it' gesture?" Due to the efforts of Tom Jaine, Petits Propos Culinaires devoted volume 87, February 2009 to a reprint of the 1935 Good Food Register. In critical respects, the Good Food Register and Where Shall We Eat or Put Up? resembles what was to become Raymond Postgate's The Good Food Guide which started in 1951.

== Published works ==
White is most remembered for her cookery book, Good Things in England, originally published in 1932, and which has gone through multiple editions. It includes 853 recipes that people from all over the United Kingdom sent to the EFCA and to White who then edited them, created a general introduction, and organized into chapters, including ones on English breakfasts, homemade bread, luncheon and supper dishes, recipes common at country and schoolroom teas, as well as suggested menus for each season of the year.

- Easy Dressmaking (1891)
- Good Things in England (1932 and 1999)
- Flowers as Food (1934)
- Good Food Register (1934, 1935)
- Where Shall We Eat or Put Up? In England, Wales, Scotland and Ireland (1936)
- A Fire in the Kitchen (1938)
- Good English Food, Local and Regional (posthumously, 1952)
