= Architectural History (journal) =

Brisish peer-reviewed journal

- Discipline: History of architecture
- Language: English
- Edited by: Dr Alborz Dianat

Publication details
- History: 1958–present
- Publisher: SAHGB Publications (United Kingdom)
- Frequency: Annually

Standard abbreviations
- ISO 4: Archit. Hist.

Indexing
- ISSN: 0066-622X
- LCCN: 2005-237367
- JSTOR: 0066622X
- OCLC no.: 62483180

Links
- Journal homepage

Architectural History is an annual peer-reviewed journal published by the Society of Architectural Historians of Great Britain (SAHGB).

The journal is published each autumn. The architecture of the British Isles is a major theme of the journal, but articles can consider all places and periods. All members of the SAHGB receive the journal, as do subscribing institutional libraries. Older issues from its inception in 1958 onwards are available online through JSTOR.

The editor-in-chief is Dr Alborz Dianat, of University College Dublin.
