= Horace Annesley Vachell =

English writer (1861–1955)

Horace Vachell
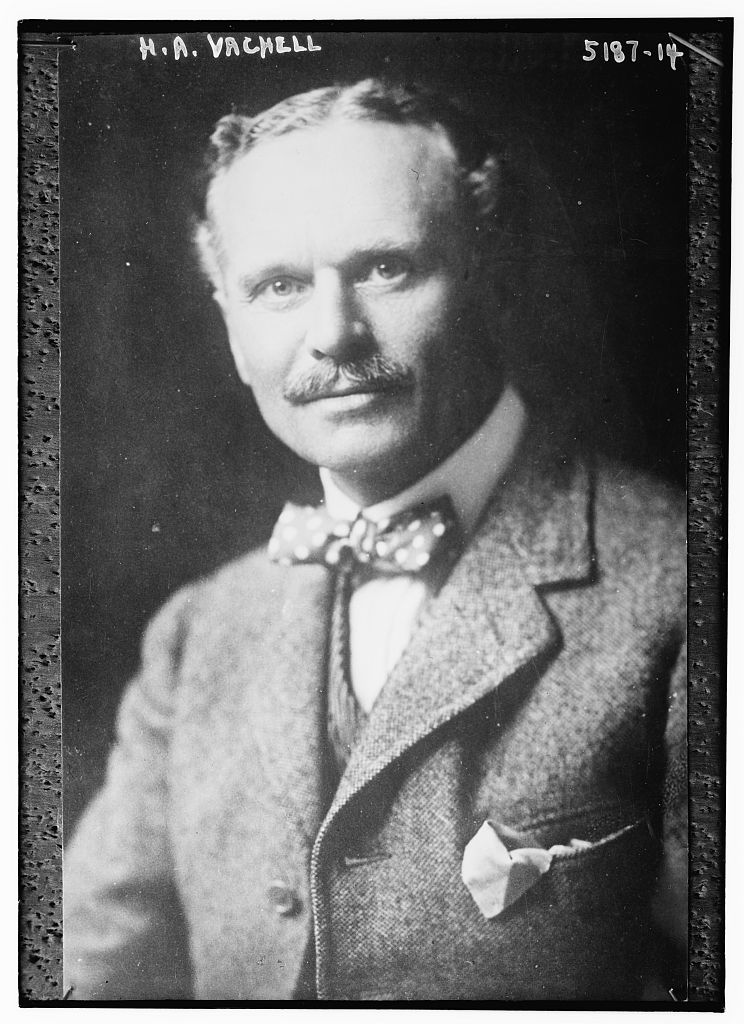
- Vachell ca. 1920
- Born: Horace Annesley Vachell; October 30, 1861; Sydenham, London, England
- Died: 10 January 1955 (aged 93); Bath, Somerset, England
- Resting place: St Thomas à Becket Church, Widcombe
- Education: Harrow School
- Occupation: Writer
- Spouse: Eliza Phillips
- Writing career
- Notable works: Lord Camber's Ladies; The Story of Shirley Yorke

Horace Annesley Vachell (30 October 1861 – 10 January 1955) was a prolific English writer of novels, plays, short stories, essays and autobiographical works.

== Early life and education ==
Vachell was born at Sydenham, Kent on 30 October 1861, eldest of three sons of former landowner Richard Tanfield Vachell (died 1868), of Coptfold Hall, Essex, and Georgina (died 1910), daughter of Arthur Lyttelton Annesley, of Arley Castle, Staffordshire. He was a distant kinsman of the schoolmaster and clergyman Edward Lyttelton and his brother, politician Alfred Lyttelton, sons of George Lyttelton, 4th Baron Lyttelton. Vachell was educated at Harrow and Sandhurst.

== Career ==
After a short period in the Rifle Brigade, he went to California, with his brother Arthur H. Vachell, where he became partner in a land company. He is said to have introduced the game of polo to Southern California.

After 17 years abroad, by 1900 Vachell had returned to England. He went on to write over 50 volumes of fiction including a popular school story, The Hill (1905), which gives an idealised view of life at Harrow and of the friendship between two boys.

He also wrote 22 plays, the most successful of which in his lifetime was Quinneys (1914), made into a film in 1919 and again in 1927. A 90 minute BBC television adaptation was broadcast in 1948 and another in 1956. The BBC also broadcast numerous radio adaptations over the years. 'Quinneys' was first published as a book by John Murray, London in 1914. It was "a book of friends; of quaint human characters against the background of a shop for faked antiques and genuine love." The same characters featured in three subsequent books and other magazine stories.

Another play, The Case of Lady Camber (1915), was the basis for the film Lord Camber's Ladies (1932), produced by Alfred Hitchcock but not directed by him. It was later adapted again as The Story of Shirley Yorke. Vachell's last autobiographical book, More from Methuselah (1951), was published in the year of his 90th birthday.

Although some fiction, like the stories in Bunch Grass (1912), is set in American ranching country, much of his writing concerns a comfortably prosperous English way of life which was echoed in Widcombe Manor, his house near Bath, and his old-fashioned, distinguished appearance and manner. He was a fellow of the Royal Society of Literature.

He died on 10 January 1955 in Bath, and is buried in the churchyard of St Thomas à Becket, adjacent to Widcombe Manor.

== Personal life ==
In 1889, Vachell married Eliza (born 1869; known as "Lydie" or Lydia), daughter of Chauncy Hatch Phillips, his partner in the Californian land company; they had a son- killed in service during the First World War- and a daughter. She died in 1895 after the birth of their daughter.

== Works ==
Many of Vachell's works first appeared in serialisations in Cassell's Magazine, The Cornhill Magazine, The Pall Mall Magazine, Pearson's Magazine, The Strand Magazine, The Windsor Magazine and other contemporary magazines.

=== Books ===
- A Drama in Sunshine (1898)
- The Procession of Life (1899)
- John Charity: A Romance of Yesterday (1900)
- Life and Sport on the Pacific Slope (1901)
- The Pinch of Prosperity: A Study of Some Twisted Lives (1903)
- The Hill: A Romance of Friendship (1905)
- The Face of Clay: An Interpretation (1906)
- Her Son (1907)
- The Waters of Jordan (1908)
- The Impending Sword: An Adventure by the Sea (1909)
- The Paladin: As Beheld by a Woman of Temperament (1909)
- John Verney (1911)
- Bunch Grass: A Chronicle of Life on a Cattle Ranch (1912)
- Blinds Down: A Chronicle of Charminster (1912)
- Humpty Dumpty (date unknown)
- Quinneys (1914)
- Searchlights (1915)
- The Case of Lady Camber (1915)
- Who is he? (1915)
- Pen (1916)
- Mrs Pomeroy's Reputation (1916)
- Mr Jubilee Drax (1916)
- The Mirror (1917)
- Fishpingle: A Romance of the Countryside (1917)
- Whitewash (1920)
- The Fourth Dimension (1920)
- Change Partners (1923)
- Quinney's Adventures (1924)
- Miss Torrobin's Experiment (1928)
- The Homely Art (an essay on furnishing), James Shoolbred & Co (1928)
- The Leading Man (1929)
- At The Sign of the Grid (1931) – serialised in The Windsor Magazine (July 1930 to April 1931)
- This was England (1932)
- Arising Out of That (1935)
- Joe Quinney's Jodie (1936) – serialised in The Windsor Magazine (September 1935 to September 1936)
- Quinneys for Quality (1938) – serialised in The Windsor Magazine (October 1937 to September 1938)
- Averil (1945)
