= Good Things in England =

1932 recipe book by Florence White

- Title page for Good Things in England (1932)
- Author: Florence White
- Language: English
- Genre: Cookbook
- Publication date: 1932

Good Things in England is a compendium of recipes written by Florence White and published in 1932. The book includes regional recipes dating back to the 14th century, with short informative introductions to each section. Good Things in England went on to influence numerous generations of food writers and culinarians, among them, Jane Grigson, who considered Florence White, along with Dorothy Hartley, one of her touchstones when it came to reminding readers of the importance of British cooking.

Specializing in English food folklore, White had founded the English Folk Cookery Association a year before in 1931. She sought to promote traditional English cuisine in the face of popular French cooking. Via this association, people had sent her traditional recipes.

The book was reprinted in 1951 and again in 1962, but then remained out of print until being republished by Persephone Books in 1999. It was included in The Observer Food Monthly 50 Best Cookbooks series in 2010.
