= Laurence Gomme =

British folklorist and public servant (1853–1916)

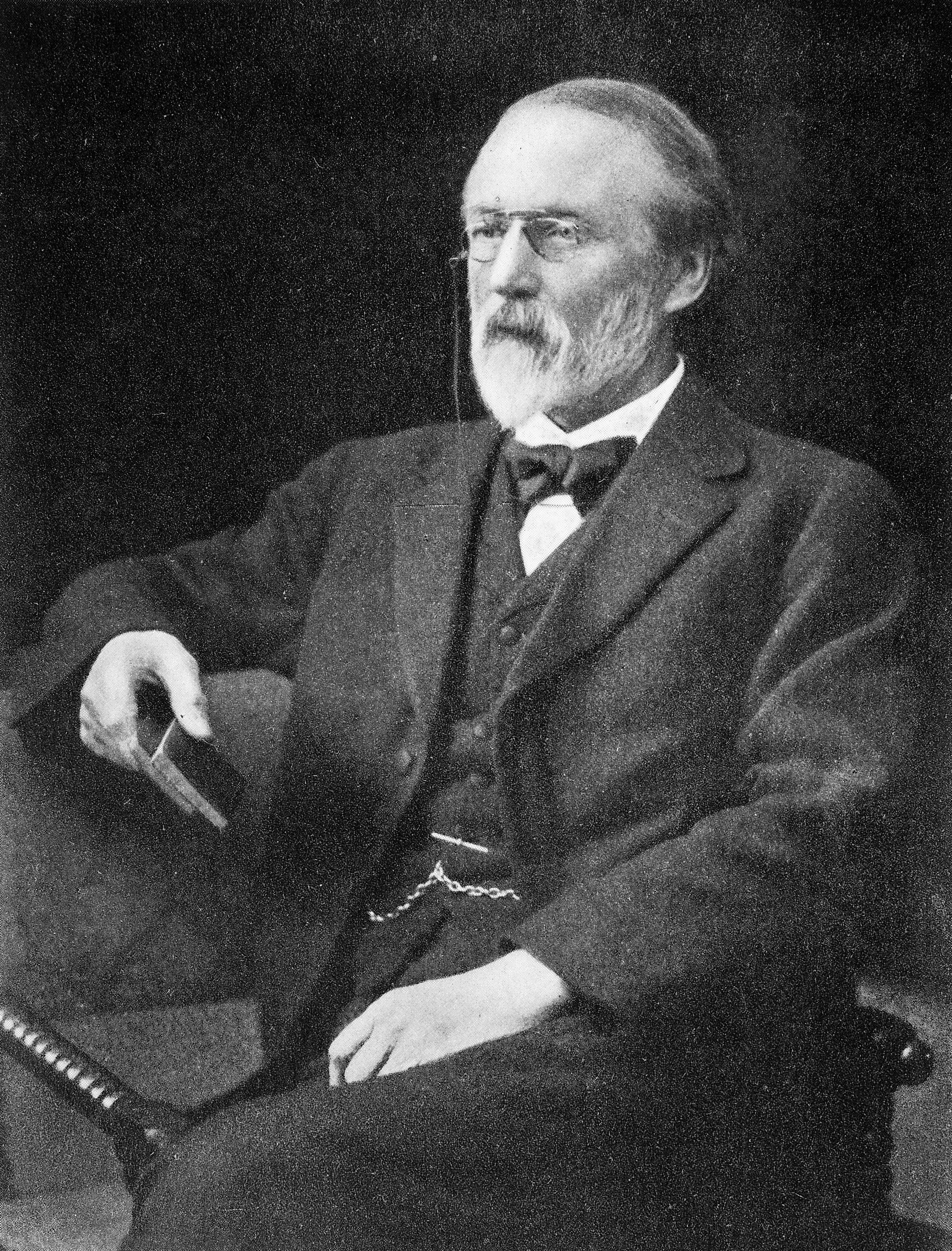
Sir Laurence Gomme

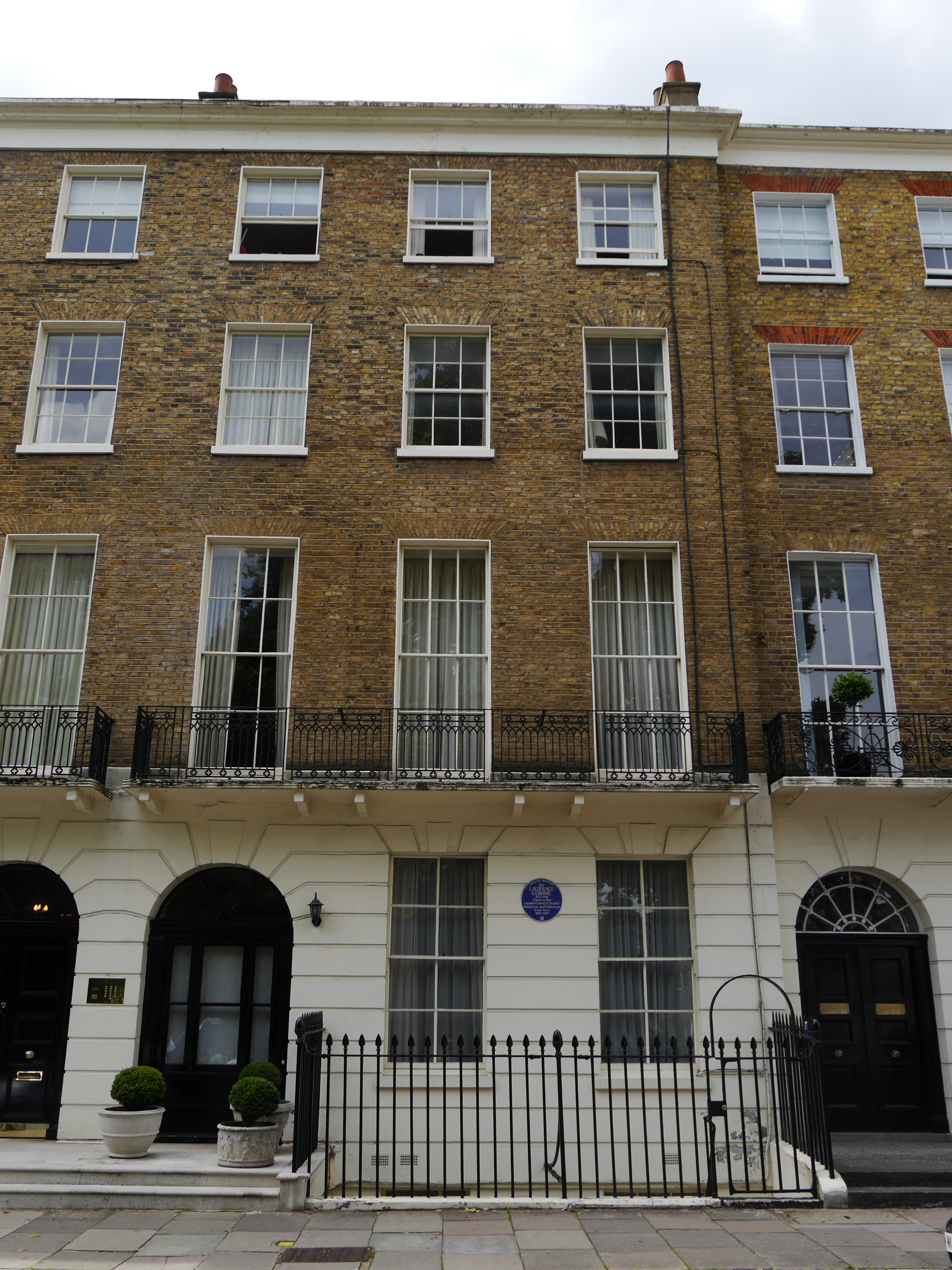
24 Dorset Square, London

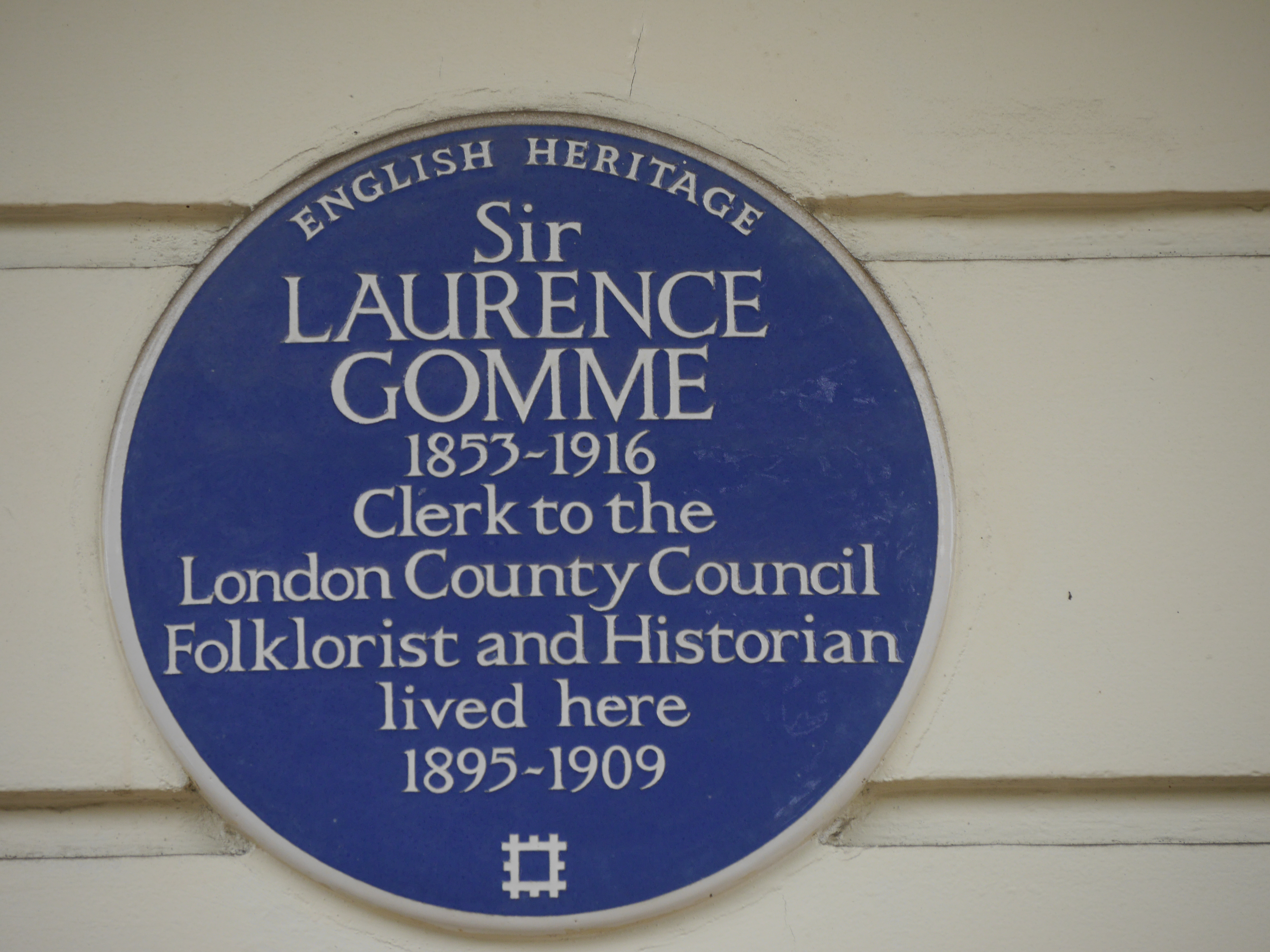
Blue plaque, 24 Dorset Square

Sir George Laurence Gomme, FSA (18 December 1853 – 23 February 1916) was a public servant and antiquarian. Two of his main interests were folklore and old buildings. He helped found both the Victoria County History and the Folklore Society, and persuaded the London County Council to administer the blue plaque commemorative scheme.

== Life ==
Gomme was born in London's district of Stepney, the second of ten children of William Laurence Gomme (1828–1887), an engineer, and his wife Mary (1831–1921). He attended the City of London School to the age of sixteen, when he started work, first with a railway company, then with the Fulham board of works, finally, in 1873, with the Metropolitan Board of Works: he remained with it and its successor, the London County Council, until his retirement in 1914. His position as statistical officer, from 1893, and then as clerk to the council, from 1900, gave him a major role in policy and administration.

His interest with folklore he shared with his wife, Alice Bertha Gomme, born Alice Bertha Merck (1853–1938), whom he married on 31 March 1875. The couple had seven sons, including Arthur Allan Gomme, a librarian and historian of technology, and Arnold Wycombe Gomme, a noted classical scholar.

Both Gomme and his wife were founder members of the Folklore Society in 1878; and Gomme later became its honorary secretary, director and president. Gomme published Primitive Folk Moots (1880), and many books and articles concerning folklore, including Folklore Relics of Early Village Life (1883), Ethnology in Folklore (1892) and Folklore as a Historical Science (1908). His work is now generally regarded as too dependent on a survivals theory, which tried to trace folk customs back to earlier stages of civilisation; but it retains value as a collection.

His historical writings show a particular interest in the history of London, in books such as The Governance of London (1907) and The Making of London (1912). He was also one of the founders of the Victoria County History project, and had a passion for old buildings. He used his council position to protect threatened buildings and to advance the Survey of London, to which he also contributed historical material. Another overlap of his historical and professional interests was the blue plaque commemorative scheme, which he persuaded the council to begin administering in 1901: the 800th blue plaque to be awarded would later mark his own London residence in 24 Dorset Square.

He was knighted in 1911. Not long afterwards, in 1914, ill health caused him to retire; and he died of pernicious anemia on 23 February 1916 at his country home in Long Crendon, Buckinghamshire.
