= List of Sgt. Frog episodes =

The five main frog-like aliens in the first opening of the series. From left to right: Tamama, Dororo, Kururu, Giroro and Keroro.

Sgt. Frog, also known as Sergeant Keroro and originally titled as Keroro Gunso, is a Japanese television series produced and animated by Sunrise. The series centers around the attempted invasion of Earth by a Platoon of 5 frog-like aliens and the mishaps that their incompetent and lazy leader cause. Around them are the human figures that help them understand earth's culture. The anime is an adaptation of Mine Yoshizaki's manga series of the same name, which was first serialized in Japan's Shōnen Ace in 1999, and has been toned down for children instead of focusing on teenagers.

It first began airing in Japan on the television network TV Tokyo on March 20, 2004, and has since broadcast over 300 episodes, which are normally constituted from two 15 minute shorts mostly and sometimes one 30 minute story. The anime itself is divided by seasons with a duration of a year (51 episodes per season, one per week except for the first week of January), always starting and ending the first week of April. The title for each episode of the series always starts with the name of a character that becomes the episode's focus.

The first English dub of the show to be released was titled Sergeant Keroro and aired on the Southeast Asian TV channel Animax Asia. It premiered in 2008. In 2009, Funimation Entertainment released the second English dubbed version of the anime. Funimation's dub was released in North America, and has spanned a total of six 12 to 14-episode DVD sets, with the first four sets later released in two larger 25 to 26-episode box sets. To date, the first 78 episodes have been released in English by FUNimation.

== Series overview ==
The seasons that compromise the episode list correspond to Bandai Visual's DVD releases in Japan. In Japan, Sgt. Frog aired year-round continuously with preemptions in place for specials and sporting events, not split into standard seasonal cycles.

Season	Episodes	Originally released	
Season	Episodes	First released	Last released
1	51	April 3, 2004	March 26, 2005
2	52	April 1, 2005	March 31, 2006
3	51	April 7, 2006	March 30, 2007
4	51	April 7, 2007	March 29, 2008
5	51	April 5, 2008	March 28, 2009
6	51	April 4, 2009	March 27, 2010
7	51	April 3, 2010	April 3, 2011

== Episode list ==
=== Season 1 (2004–05) ===
No.	Title	Original release date
1	"I Am Sergeant Keroro! / Meet the Sergeant!"; Transliteration: "Wagahai ga Keroro Gunsō de Arimasu" (Japanese: 我が輩がケロロ軍曹 であります)	March 20, 2004
1	"Sergeant Keroro Rising / Sgt. Frog Presents: The Episode That Should've Come First!"; Transliteration: "Keroro Daichi ni Tatsu de Arimasu" (Japanese: ケロロ 大地に立つ であります)	March 20, 2004
2	"Momoka & Tamama, Battle Begins! / Momoka & Tamama Present: Bag of Secrets!"; Transliteration: "Momoka ando Tamama Shutsugeki! de Arimasu" (Japanese: 桃華&タママ 出撃! であります)	April 10, 2004
2	"Momoka & Tamama, Operation Overload the Hinatas / Momoka & Tamama Present: Cow Flesh of Love!"; Transliteration: "Momoka ando Tamama Hinatake Jōriku de Arimasu" (Japanese: 桃華&タママ 日向家上陸 であります)	April 10, 2004
3	"Keroro, Lethal Nervous Breakdown / Amphibian on the Verge of a Nervous Breakdown!"; Transliteration: "Keroro Kiken Rinkaiten Toppa de Arimasu" (Japanese: ケロロ 危険臨界点突破 であります)	April 17, 2004
3	"Keroro, The Secret Mission Begins / Who Watches the Watch-Pekoponians?"; Transliteration: "Keroro Gokuhi Ninmu Kaishi de Arimasu" (Japanese: ケロロ 極秘任務開始 であります)	April 17, 2004
4	"Giroro, The Most Dangerous Man in the Universe / Giroro Presents: Blood Violence Death Kill!"; Transliteration: "Giroro Uchū de Mottomo Kiken na Otoko de Arimasu" (Japanese: ギロロ 宇宙でもっとも危険な男 であります)	April 24, 2004
4	"Keroro, An Occasionally Dangerous Man / Oh, the Humidity!"; Transliteration: "Keroro Ame Tokidoki Kiken na Otoko de Arimasu" (Japanese: ケロロ 雨時々危険な男 であります)	April 24, 2004
5	"The Song of a Man Obsessed with Toys / The Day the Gundam Cried"; Transliteration: "Omocha o Aisuru Otokotachi no Uta de Arimasu" (Japanese: おもちゃを愛する男達の歌 であります)	May 1, 2004
6	"Momoka, Romantic Plan on the South Seas / Operation: Free My Beached Love... With a Kiss!"; Transliteration: "Momoka Raburabu Nankai Daisakusen de Arimasu" (Japanese: 桃華 ラブラブ南海大作戦 であります)	May 8, 2004
6	"Momoka, Spooky Plan on the South Seas / Operation: Ghost Kiss-perer!"; Transliteration: "Momoka Hyūdoro Nankai Daisakusen de Arimasu" (Japanese: 桃華 ひゅ～どろ南海大作戦 であります)	May 8, 2004
7	"Mois, First Attempt to Destroy Earth / Angol Mois Presents: Apocalypse Later!"; Transliteration: "Moa Hajimete no Chikyū Hakai de Arimasu" (Japanese: モア はじめての地球破壊 であります)	May 15, 2004
7	"Tamama vs. Mois: Tamama's Defeat / Angol Mois & Tamama Present: Sergeant Strangelove: or How I learned to stop worrying and love the frog." Transliteration: "Tamama tai Moa Kekka wa Tamama no Make de Arimasu" (Japanese: タママ VS モア 結果はタママの負け であります)	May 15, 2004
8	"Keroro, Invasion Status is Never Better / Handsome Keroro Presents: Invasion Status Is Never Better. Or Building a Base for Dummies."; Transliteration: "Keroro Shinryaku Sakusen Zekkōchō! de Arimasu" (Japanese: ケロロ 侵略作戦絶好調! であります)	May 22, 2004
8	"Keroro, Building a Base for Dummies / Handsome Keroro Presents: Base: The Final Frontier"; Transliteration: "Keroro Machigai Darake no Kichi Tsukuri de Arimasu" (Japanese: ケロロ 間違いだらけの基地作り であります)	May 22, 2004
9	"Natsumi, Where Love Blooms, Kululu Looms / Desperately Seeking Brains"; Transliteration: "Natsumi Koi no Yukute ni Kuru Kururu de Arimasu" (Japanese: 夏美 恋の行く手に来るクルル であります)	May 29, 2004
9	"Aki Hinata, A Dynamite Woman / The Curious Case of Aki Hinata"; Transliteration: "Hinata Aki Dainamaito na Onna de Arimasu" (Japanese: 日向 秋 ダイナマイトな女 であります)	May 29, 2004
10	"Face-off! Decisive Battle over Molar-3 / Sgt. Frog vs. The Cavitians Of Cavity 9!"; Transliteration: "Kessen! Daisan Daikyūshi de Arimasu" (Japanese: 決戦! 第三大臼歯 であります)	June 5, 2004
11	"Keroro Platoon Must Appear on TV! / Fantasti-cool Keroro Presents: Fake It Til You Make It!"; Transliteration: "Keroro Shōtai Terebi ni Shutsuen seyo! de Arimasu" (Japanese: ケロロ小隊 テレビに出演せよ! であります)	June 12, 2004
12	"Sumomo, A Pop Star Travels Across Space / Sumomo Presents: Pop Startled!"; Transliteration: "Sumomo Aidoru wa Uchū o Koete" (Japanese: すもも アイドルは宇宙をこえて であります)	June 19, 2004
12	"Giroro, A Small Angel on the Battlefield / It's the Belt, Stupid!"; Transliteration: "Giroro Senjō no Chiisana Tenshi de Arimasu" (Japanese: ギロロ 戦場のちいさな天使 であります)	June 19, 2004
13	"Dororo, The Forgotten Soldier / Dororo Presents: The Frog That Friends Forgot"; Transliteration: "Dororo Wasurerareta Senshi de Arimasu" (Japanese: ドロロ 忘れられた戦士 でります)	June 26, 2004
13	"Dororo and Koyuki, A Beautiful Friendship / Dororo & Koyuki Present: Viper? I Hardly Even Knew Her!"; Transliteration: "Dororo ando Koyuki Yūjō wa Utsukushiki de Arimasu" (Japanese: ドロロ&小雪 友情は美しき哉 であります)	June 26, 2004
14	"Five People Gathering! Probably the Greatest Plan in History / ARMPIT Platoon Present: The Silence of the Plans!"; Transliteration: "Gonin Shūketsu! Tabun Shijō Saidai no Sakusen de Arimasu" (Japanese: 五人集結! たぶん史上最大の作戦 であります)	July 3, 2004
15	"Momoka, Dark Momoka Arises / The Dark Momoka Saga, Part 1 Plus Pool Training!"; Transliteration: "Momoka Ura Momoka Kōrin de Arimasu" (Japanese: 桃華 裏桃華 降臨 であります)	July 10, 2004
15	"Dark Momoka, The Story Behind Her Betrayal / The Dark Momoka Saga, Part 2 And More Pool Fun!"; Transliteration: "Ura Momoka Uragiri no Uragawa de Arimasu" (Japanese: 裏桃華 裏切りの裏側 であります)	July 10, 2004
16	"Mois, Dark Mois Arises!? / Angol Mois Presents: Girl Gone Wild!"; Transliteration: "Moa Ura Moa Kōrin!? de Arimasu" (Japanese: モア 裏モア 降臨!? であります)	July 17, 2004
16	"Mois, Mois Mois' Big Panic Twin At All Costs! / Angol Mois Presents: Twin at All Costs!"; Transliteration: "Moa Moamoa Daipanikku de Arimasu" (Japanese: モア モアモア大パニック であります)	July 17, 2004
17	"Keroro vs Natsumi, Battle in the Waters! / Keroro vs. Natsumi Present: Froggy Paddle"; Transliteration: "Keroro tai Natsumi Suichū Daikessen! de Arimasu" (Japanese: ケロロ VS 夏美 水中大決戦! であります)	July 24, 2004
17	"Fuyuki, Welcome to Horror World / Fuyuki Presents: Night of the Living Room!"; Transliteration: "Fuyuki Yōkoso Horā Wārudo e de Arimasu" (Japanese: 冬樹 ようこそホラーワールドへ であります)	July 24, 2004
18	"Natsumi Is Hilarious! Coast Story of an Adult / Today's Adventure: Wet, Hot, Beaches!"; Transliteration: "Natsumi Bakushō! Otona no Kaigan Monogatari de Arimasu" (Japanese: 夏美 爆笑! 大人の海岸物語 であります)	July 31, 2004
19	"Keroro vs. Natsumi Festival Showdown! / Keroro and Natsumi Present: The Ultimate Festival Challenge!"; Transliteration: "Keroro tai Natsumi Omatsuri Chōjō Kessen! de Arimasu" (Japanese: ケロロ VS 夏美 おまつり頂上決戦! であります)	August 7, 2004
19	"Keroro, Your Ears have been Invaded by the Radio / Handsome Keroro Presents: Keroro Killed The Radio Star!"; Transliteration: "Keroro Anata no Omimi ni Shinryaku Rajio de Arimasu" (Japanese: ケロロ あなたのお耳に侵略ラジオ であります)	August 7, 2004
20	"Fuyuki Meets A Girl / Make Subs, Not War! Then Make War!"; Transliteration: "Fuyuki Mītsu A Gāru de Arimasu" (Japanese: 冬樹 ミーツ・ア・ガァ～ル であります)	August 14, 2004
20	"Fuyuki, Messenger of Nontolma / 20,000 Leaps Under the Sea!"; Transliteration: "Fuyuki Nontoruma no Shisha de Arimasu" (Japanese: 冬樹 ノントルマの使者 であります)	August 14, 2004
21	"Keroro's Invasion can Conserve Energy / Handsome Keroro Presents: Some Like It Scorching and Miserable!"; Transliteration: "Keroro Shinryaku mo Shōene de ne de Arimasu" (Japanese: ケロロ 侵略も省エネでね であります)	August 21, 2004
21	"Keroro Charges To The Countryside / Handsome Keroro Presents: Mother's Superior!"; Transliteration: "Keroro Inaka ni Mukete Totsugeki seyo! de Arimasu" (Japanese: ケロロ 田舎にむけて突撃せよ! であります)	August 21, 2004
22	"Tamama, From now on I'm the Leader / Today's Adventure: Lose the Boss! (don't kill me..)" Transliteration: "Tamama Kyō kara Boku ga Taichō desū de Arimasu" (Japanese: タママ 今日からボクが隊長ですぅ であります)	August 28, 2004
23	"Panic! The Noisiest Day of the Hinata Family / Handsome Keroro Presents: The Clone Wars (The Unsucky Version)"; Transliteration: "Panikku! Hinataka no Mottomo Sawagashii Ichinichi de Arimasu" (Japanese: パニック! 日向家の最も騒がしい一日 であります)	September 4, 2004
24	"Keroro, The Space Detective of Righteousness and Poverty / Handsome Keroro Presents: The Man In The Ironic Mask!"; Transliteration: "Keroro Seigi to binbō no Uchū Tantei de Arimasu" (Japanese: ケロロ 正義と貧乏の宇宙探偵 であります)	September 11, 2004
24	"Kogoro, Tokusatsu Employment On The Frontline / Space Deputy Kogoro Presents: Lost Action Hero!"; Transliteration: "Kogorō Tokusatsu Shūshoku Saizensen! de Arimasu" (Japanese: 556 特撮就職最前線! であります)	September 11, 2004
25	"Momoka, Escapee of Love, Youth, and Troubles / Momoka Presents: A Justified War!"; Transliteration: "Momoka Ai to Seishun to Haran no Tōbō de Arimasu" (Japanese: 桃華 愛と青春と波乱の逃亡 であります)	September 18, 2004
26	"Keroro Unite Together! Let's Invade the Sports Meet / Let the Games Impend!"; Transliteration: "Keroro Itchi danketsu! Undōkai o Shinryaku seyo de Arimasu" (Japanese: ケロロ 一致団結! 運動会を侵略せよ であります)	September 25, 2004
27	"Keroro Father Is Going! Father Is Coming! / Handsome Keroro Presents: Keroro's Daddy Issue!"; Transliteration: "Keroro Chichi Kitaru Chichi Kaeru de Arimasu" (Japanese: ケロロ 父キタル父カエル であります)	October 2, 2004
27	"Keroro Hot Spring, Go! Go! Go! / Amazing Keroro Presents: Should I Spa or Should I Go Now?"; Transliteration: "Keroro Onsen GO! GO! GO! de Arimasu" (Japanese: ケロロ 温泉GO! GO! GO! であります)	October 2, 2004
28	"Keroro Snowball Fight Survival / Handsome Keroro Presents: Das Snow Boot!"; Transliteration: "Keroro Yukigassen Sabaibaru de Arimasu" (Japanese: ケロロ 雪合戦サバイバル であります)	October 9, 2004
28	"Kululu Ku of Kukuku / Kululu Presents: Ku Ku Kachoo Mr. Narrator"; Transliteration: "Kururu Kukkukku no Ku de Arimasu" (Japanese: クルル クックックのクッ であります)	October 9, 2004
29	"Natsumi and Koyuki, Youth Written On Stage / Natsumi Hinata in: Actor Schmactor"; Transliteration: "Natsumi ando Koyuki Butai ni Kakeru Seishun de Arimasu" (Japanese: 夏美&小雪 舞台にかける青春 であります)	October 16, 2004
29	"Keroro Scoop NG! / Handsome Keroro Presents: Close Encounters of the Frog Kind"; Transliteration: "Keroro Sukūpu wa NG! de Arimasu" (Japanese: ケロロ スクープはNG! であります)	October 16, 2004
30	"Tamama, Youth From Keron Planet / Twit Came from Outer Space"; Transliteration: "Tamama Keronsei kara Kita Shōnen" (Japanese: タママ ケロン星から来た少年 であります)	October 23, 2004
30	"Momoka's Aim For A Nice Body / Extreme Makeover: Momoka Edition"; Transliteration: "Momoka Mezase Naisu Badi de Arimasu" (Japanese: 桃華 めざせナイスバディ であります)	October 23, 2004
31	"Keroro Wanting to Go Back Home, But Can't / Handsome Keroro Presents: Lost In Transportation"; Transliteration: "Keroro Kaeritai Kaerenai...de Arimasu" (Japanese: ケロロ 帰りたい 帰れない… であります)	October 30, 2004
32	"Keroro Animal Platoon Assemble / Animal Army Attack!"; Transliteration: "Keroro Dōbutsutaiin Daishūgō de Arimasu" (Japanese: ケロロ 動物隊員大集合 であります)	November 6, 2004
32	"Giroro, Kitty Wants To Say / Giroro Presents: Kitty Conundrum!"; Transliteration: "Giroro Neko wa Iitai de Arimasu" (Japanese: ギロロ ネコは言いたい であります)	November 6, 2004
33	"Keroro Platoon Invades Pekopon In the Anime / Handsome Keroro Presents: The Episode We Wanted to Call Tiny Toons or Animaniacs, But Those Were Already Taken"; Transliteration: "Keroro Shōtai Anime de Pekopon Shinryaku de Arimasu" (Japanese: ケロロ小隊 アニメでペコポン侵略 であります)	November 13, 2004
34	"Momoka vs. Koyuki Hotspring Battle / Hot Spring Hilarity"; Transliteration: "Momoka tai Koyuki Onsen Sōdatsu Batoru de Arimasu" (Japanese: 桃華 VS 小雪 温泉争奪バトル であります)	November 20, 2004
34	"Keroro And Fuyuki Go Together / Frog on the Run!"; Transliteration: "Keroro ando Fuyuki Mattari Iko de Arimasu" (Japanese: ケロロ&冬樹 まったり行こっ であります)	November 20, 2004
35	"Top Secret! Natsumi's Birthday Strategy / The Birthday the Earth Stood Still!"; Transliteration: "Gokuhi! Natsumi no Otanjōbi Daisakusen de Arimasu" (Japanese: 極秘! 夏美のお誕生日大作戦 であります)	November 27, 2004
36	"Keroro Death Battle! Gunso vs. General Winter / A Frog In Winter"; Transliteration: "keroro Shitō! Gunsō tai Fuyushōgun" (Japanese: ケロロ 死闘! 軍曹 VS 冬将軍 であります)	December 4, 2004
36	"Fuyuki That's How It Is, Miss Nishizawa / Escape to Which Mountain?"; Transliteration: "Fuyuki Sō Nan desu yo Nishizawa-san de Arimasu" (Japanese: 冬樹 そ～なんですよ西澤さん であります)	December 4, 2004
37	"Dororo to the Ninja Classroom / Storefront Shinobi!"; Transliteration: "Dororo Kitare Ninja Kyōshitsu e de Arimasu" (Japanese: ドロロ きたれ忍者教室へ であります)	December 11, 2004
37	"Keroro's Dinosaur / Jurassic Lark"; Transliteration: "Keroro no Kyōryū de Arimasu" (Japanese: ケロロ の恐竜 であります)	December 11, 2004
38	"Giroro Love Robot Soldiers / TV's Shooters & Practical Jokes"; Transliteration: "Giroro Ai no Kidō Hohei de Arimasu" (Japanese: ギロロ 愛の機動歩兵 であります)	December 18, 2004
38	"Giroro vs. Natsumi Re-encounter... / One Potato, Two Potato, Sweet Potato, Amore"; Transliteration: "Giroro tai Natsumi Meguriai...mo de Arimasu" (Japanese: ギロロ VS 夏美 めぐりあい…も であります)	December 18, 2004
39	"Keroro Christmas Battle / The Space Frog Who Stole Christmas!"; Transliteration: "Keroro Kurisumasu Daisakusen de Arimasu" (Japanese: ケロロ クリスマス大作戦 であります)	December 25, 2004
39	"Keroro Spring Cleaning Battle / Keroro: Kahn of Klean!"; Transliteration: "Keroro Shigoto Osame no Daisōji de Arimasu" (Japanese: ケロロ 仕事納めの大掃除 であります)	December 25, 2004
40	"Mois, You Could Say Happy New Year? / Soup's Wrong!"; Transliteration: "Moa Teiu ka Kinga Shinnen? de Arimasu" (Japanese: モア ていうか謹賀新年? であります)	January 1, 2005
40	"Keroro The Food Is Good, Same For Homework / We Don't Needs No Education!"; Transliteration: "Keroro Osechi mo Ii kedo Shukudai mo ne de Arimasu" (Japanese: ケロロ おせちもいいけど宿題もね であります)	January 1, 2005
41	"Keroro Invasion Strategy / A Low Down Dirty Game!"; Transliteration: "Keroro Sugoroku Kōryakusen de Arimasu" (Japanese: ケロロ すごろく攻略戦 であります)	January 8, 2005
41	"Dororo Is a Fiery Spirit / Self Improvement Is Mass Elation"; Transliteration: "Dororo Mō Retsu ni Nekketsu seyo de Arimasu" (Japanese: ドロロ もーれつに熱血せよ であります)	January 8, 2005
42	"Keroro and The Red-Blooded Keroro Platoon / War of the World's Cup!"; Transliteration: "Keroro Akakichi no Keroro Shōtai" (Japanese: ケロロ 赤き血のケロロ小隊 であります)	January 15, 2005
42	"Tamama, Jealousy Shoot of Friendship / Friend Him Like Beckham"; Transliteration: "Tamama Yūjō no Shitto Shūto! de Arimasu" (Japanese: タママ 友情の嫉妬シュート! であります)	January 15, 2005
43	"Giroro The Red Demon Who Cannot Cry / Red vs. Blue)"; Transliteration: "Giroro Nakenai Aka Oni de Arimasu" (Japanese: ギロロ 泣けない赤鬼 であります)	January 22, 2005
43	"Giroro, Flying into Setsubun / Springtime for Hitters"; Transliteration: "Giroro Tobidase Setsubun! de Arimasu" (Japanese: ギロロ 飛び出せ節分! であります)	January 22, 2005
44	"Keroro vs. Fuyuki Heated Sports Match / Alpine Broheims"; Transliteration: "Keroro tai Fuyuki Supōtsu de Kettō de Arimasu" (Japanese: ケロロ VS 冬樹 スポーツで決闘 であります)	January 29, 2005
44	"Kululu vs. Aki Exploding Invasion of Robots / Domo Arigato, Aki Roboto!"; Transliteration: "Kururu tai Aki Shinryaku Robo de Bakutō de Arimasu" (Japanese: クルル VS 秋 侵略ロボで爆闘 であります)	January 29, 2005
45	"Keroro, Sudden Love for Dango / St. Valentine's Day Mass Production"; Transliteration: "Keroro Ai no Ikinari Dango de Arimasu" (Japanese: ケロロ 愛のいきなりだんご であります)	February 5, 2005
45	"Natsumi And Momoka, Valentine Operation Initiated / V for Valentinedetta!"; Transliteration: "Natsumi ando Momoka Barentain Sakusen Hatsudō! de Arimasu" (Japanese: 夏美&桃華 V(バレンタイン)作戦発動! であります)	February 5, 2005
46	"Keroro Have You Forgotten Me? / Ghost in the Cell!"; Transliteration: "Keroro Anata Wasurerarete Imasen ka? de Arimasu" (Japanese: ケロロ あなた忘れられていませんか? であります)	February 12, 2005
47	"Natsumi, Protect the Girls Festival / Frogs and Dolls!"; Transliteration: "Natsumi Hinamatsuri o Mamore de Arimasu" (Japanese: 夏美 ひなまつりを守れ であります)	February 19, 2005
47	"Keroro Becomes Afro / Saturday Night Deceiver"; Transliteration: "Keroro Afuro de Myaon de Arimasu" (Japanese: ケロロ アフロでみゃおん であります)	February 19, 2005
48	"Keroro Platoon Spring's Ooh-La-La Battle / Spring Asleepening"; Transliteration: "Keroro Shōtai Haru no Urara no Daisakusen" (Japanese: ケロロ小隊 春のうららの大作戦 であります)	February 26, 2005
48	"Fuyuki No-No Hazzard Rescue Mission / Lazy Days and Mondays Always Get Me Down!"; Transliteration: "Fuyuki Damedame Hazādo Kyūshutsu Sakusen" (Japanese: 冬樹 ダメダメハザード救出作戦 であります)	February 26, 2005
49	"Kululu, The Best Method in Space / How to Succeed in Pekopon Conquering Without Really Trying"; Transliteration: "Kururu Uchū de Umaku yaru Hōhō de Arimasu" (Japanese: クルル 宇宙でうまくやる方法 であります)	March 5, 2005
49	"Momoka, White Day Operation / Momomka's Full-proof Love Plan Plan"; Transliteration: "Momoka Howaito Dei chōjō Sakusen de Arimasu" (Japanese: 桃華 W-(ホワイト)デイ頂上作戦 であります)	March 5, 2005
50	"Natsumi, Warrior of Earth with a Fever / No More Mr. Nice Frogs!"; Transliteration: "Natsumi Kōnetsu no Chikyū Senshi de Arimasu" (Japanese: 夏美 高熱の地球戦士 であります)	March 12, 2005
50	"Giroro, If I Don't Do It, Then Who Will? / Okay, a Little More Mr. Nice Frogs!"; Transliteration: "Giroro Ore ga Yaraneba Dare ga Yaru de Arimasu" (Japanese: ギロロ 俺がやらねば誰がやる であります)	March 12, 2005
51	"Keroro Platoon Retreats! Good-bye, Pekopon / A Farewell to Arms, Legs, and Other Froggy Parts!"; Transliteration: "Keroro Shōtai Tettai! Saraba Pekopon yo de Arimasu" (Japanese: ケロロ小隊 撤退！さらばペコポンよであります)	March 26, 2005

=== Season 2 (2005–06) ===
No.	Title	Original release date
52	"Keroro Standing on Earth Once Again! (Green Dwarf: Back to Earth!)"; Transliteration: "Keroro Futatabi Daichi ni Tatsu! de Arimasu" (Japanese: ケロロ 再び大地に立つ！ であります)	April 1, 2005
52	"Tamama, Black Tamama (Damsel in a Mess!)"; Transliteration: "Tamama Kuroi Tamama de Arimasu" (Japanese: タママ 黒いタママ であります)	April 1, 2005
53	"Keroro, Plan to Invade the Treasures (Intergalactic Planetary Deep Fried Twinkies!)"; Transliteration: "Keroro Otakara Shinryaku Daisakusen! de Arimasu" (Japanese: ケロロ お宝侵略大作戦！ であります)	April 8, 2005
53	"Angol Mois, More More Flower-Seeing (Cherry Blossoms of Terror!)"; Transliteration: "Angoru Moa Hanami de Moamoa~ de Arimasu" (Japanese: アンゴル・モア 花見でモアモア～ であります)	April 8, 2005
54	"Fuyuki, I am a Famous Investigator? (Dial 'M' For Maybe I Can Solve This Murder!)"; Transliteration: "Fuyuki Meitantei wa Boku? de Arimasu" (Japanese: 冬樹 名探偵は僕？ であります)	April 15, 2005
54	"Dororo, the Revived Warrior (Tales from the Gypped: Demon Night)"; Transliteration: "Dororo Fukkatsu no Senshi de Arimasu" (Japanese: ドロロ 復活の戦士 であります)	April 15, 2005
55	"Giroro, the Resurrected Soldier (Armagarden!)"; Transliteration: "Giroro Yomigaetta Sorujā de Arimasu" (Japanese: ギロロ 蘇ったソルジャー であります)	April 22, 2005
55	"Fuyuki, Swimming Carp Flags! (Carp Diem: Seize the Planet!)"; Transliteration: "Fuyuki Oyoge Koinobori! de Arimasu" (Japanese: 冬樹 およげこいのぼり！ であります)	April 22, 2005
56	"Natsumi and Koyuki, Princesses of Tennis (Match Point: To The Death)"; Transliteration: "Natsumi & Koyuki Tenisu no Purinsesu de Arimasu" (Japanese: 夏美＆小雪 テニスのプリンセス であります)	April 29, 2005
56	"Keroro, Hope the Weather Clears Up For the Invasion (Hard to (Be a) Swallow!)"; Transliteration: "Keroro Shinryaku Hiyori no Satsuki Hare de Arimasu" (Japanese: ケロロ 侵略日和のさつき晴れ であります)	April 29, 2005
57	"Dororo, An Innate Rebel (Viper Rash!)"; Transliteration: "Dororo Gyakushū suru wa Waga ni Ari de Arimasu" (Japanese: ドロロ 逆襲するは我にあり であります)	May 6, 2005
57	"Huge Frog Against the Freak of the Southern Seas (Old School Monster Battle: Keroro Style!)"; Transliteration: "Kyodai Kaeru tai Nankai no Daikaijū de Arimasu" (Japanese: 巨大カエル対南海の大怪獣 であります)	May 6, 2005
58	"Keroro Invade the Vending Machine (My Snoballs Give Me Redbulls!)"; Transliteration: "Keroro Jihanki de Shinryaku seyo de Arimasu" (Japanese: ケロロ 自販機で侵略せよ であります)	May 13, 2005
58	"Tamama Awakens! Secret Technique (Tamama Said Knock You Out!)"; Transliteration: "Tamama Kakusei! Shin Hissatsu Waza de Arimasu" (Japanese: タママ 覚醒！新必殺技 であります)	May 13, 2005
59	"Keroro, The Cultivated Castle! (The House That Trash Built!)"; Transliteration: "Keroro Sodate yo Shiro! de Arimasu" (Japanese: ケロロ 育てよ城！ であります)	May 20, 2005
59	"Keroro's Moving Castle! (How the West Was Run!)"; Transliteration: "Keroro no, Ugoku Shiro! de Arimasu" (Japanese: ケロロ の、動く城！ であります)	May 20, 2005
60	"Keroro, Ribbiting Machine Race (Honey, I Shrunk the Frogs)"; Transliteration: "Keroro Kerokero Mashin Mō Rēsu de Arimasu" (Japanese: ケロロ ケロケロマシン猛レース であります)	May 27, 2005
60	"Mois Hope That the Sleeping Princess Rests? (Sleeping Beauty Never Killed a Planet?)"; Transliteration: "Moa Nemuri Hime tte Yū ka Anmin Kibō? de Arimasu" (Japanese: モア 眠り姫ってゆーか安眠希望？ であります)	May 27, 2005
61	"Fuyuki What Happened To the Mysterious Transfer Student? (Very Superstitious, Writings On the Rock-Stone Thing?)"; Transliteration: "Fuyuki Nazo no Tenkō Shōjo ni Nani ga Okotta ka? de Arimasu" (Japanese: 冬樹 謎の転校少女にナニが起こったか？ であります)	June 3, 2005
61	"Natsumi and Saburo, The Two Who Cannot Return (Lost in Space?)"; Transliteration: "Natsumi & Saburō Modorenai Fu-ta-ri de Arimasu" (Japanese: 夏美＆サブロー 戻れないフ・タ・リ であります)	June 3, 2005
62	"Momoka, Natsumi, and Mois Phantom Thief More Peach Summer (Take Another Little Piece of My Art Now Baby!)"; Transliteration: "Momoka & Natsumi & Moa Kaitō Moa Pīchi Samā de Arimas" (Japanese: 桃華＆夏美＆モア怪盗モアピーチサマー であります)	June 10, 2005
62	"Keroro Victory! Battle In the Waters (Waterworld: Keroro Kicks Kevin's Keister)"; Transliteration: "Keroro Hisshō! Suichū Daikessen de Arimasu" (Japanese: ケロロ 必勝！水中大決戦 であります)	June 10, 2005
63	"Keroro Story Of Teacher Keroro! (Lean On Me! Wait, Don't! You're Too Heavy!)"; Transliteration: "Keroro Kyōshi Gerogero Monogatari! de Arimasu" (Japanese: ケロロ 教師ゲロゲロ物語！ であります)	June 17, 2005
63	"Keroro Reunion With Father (It Had to Be Ew.)"; Transliteration: "Keroro Saikai, Chichi yo de Arimasu" (Japanese: ケロロ 再会、父よ であります)	June 17, 2005
64	"Keroro If You Want to Suck, Suck! Give Up On Lying (Pathological Dryer!)"; Transliteration: "Keroro Suu nara Sue! Uso Yyappa Yamete de Arimasu" (Japanese: ケロロ 吸うなら吸え！ウソやっぱやめて であります)	June 24, 2005
64	"Dororo Escape From Trauma (I Won't Cry With a Little Help From My Friends)"; Transliteration: "Dororo Torauma kara no Dasshutsu de Arimasu" (Japanese: ドロロ トラウマからの脱出 であります)	June 24, 2005
65	"Keroro Bark At Pekopon Shield Law and Order with The Wire from Crime Scene Investigator's Cold Case Files: Special Visitor's Unit. Life on the Streets.)"; Transliteration: "Keroro Pekopon ni Hoero! de Arimasu" (Japanese: ケロロ ペコポンにほえろ！ であります)	July 1, 2005
65	"Tamama A Visitor From Planet Keron (ET: The Extra-Special Terrestrial)"; Transliteration: "Tamama Keronsei kara no Hōmonsha de Arimasu" (Japanese: タママ ケロン星からの訪問者 であります)	July 1, 2005
66	"Giroro, Love Rescue Mission (Love in the Time of Color T.V.)"; Transliteration: "Giroro Ai no Kyūshutsu Daisakusen de Arimasu" (Japanese: ギロロ 愛の救出大作戦 であります)	July 8, 2005
66	"Natsumi and Koyuki Heart-Beating First Date (The Spied Girls)"; Transliteration: "Natsumi ando Koyuki Dokkidokki Hatsu Dēto de Arimasu" (Japanese: 夏美＆小雪 ドッキドッキ初デート であります)	July 8, 2005
67	"Fuyuki and Momoka Secret of the Mystery Date Friday Night Frights!"; Transliteration: "Fuyuki ando Momoka Himitsu no Misuterī Dēto de Arimasu" (Japanese: 冬樹＆桃華 ひみつのミステリーデート であります)	July 15, 2005
67	"Keroro Let's Create a Game (Super Keroro Sixty-Four... For the Whee!)"; Transliteration: "Keroro Naa, Gēmu o Tsukurou ja nai ka de Arimasu" (Japanese: ケロロ なあ、ゲームを作ろうじゃないか であります)	July 15, 2005
68	"Keroro Huge Transformation! Massive Reform (House of 1000 Floors-es!)"; Transliteration: "Keroro Daikaizō! Rifōmu wa Gekiteki ni de Arimasu" (Japanese: ケロロ 大改造！リフォームは劇的に であります)	July 22, 2005
68	"Dororo, Destiny Showdown (You Ain't Nothing But a Found Dog)"; Transliteration: "Dororo Iza Mairu! Shukumei no Taiketsu de Arimasu" (Japanese: ドロロ いざまいる！宿命の対決 であります)	July 22, 2005
69	"Natsumi and Fuyuki Spirited Away (Ribbited Away)"; Transliteration: "Natsumi to Fuyuki no Kamigakushi de Arimasu" (Japanese: 夏美と冬樹 の神隠し であります)	July 29, 2005
69	"Keroro Midsummer Comedic Battle (Return to the Wet Hot Beaches)"; Transliteration: "Keroro Kōrei! Manatsu no Owarai Batoru de Arimasu" (Japanese: ケロロ 恒例！真夏のお笑いバトル であります)	July 29, 2005
70	"Keron vs. Pekopon Full Showdown!? (War and PC!)"; Transliteration: "Keronjin tai Pekoponjin Tsuini Zenmen Taiketsu ka!? de Arimasu" (Japanese: ケロン人VSペコポン人 ついに全面対決か!? であります)	August 5, 2005
70	"Koyuki Heart-Thumping First Riceball (Mighty Mousians)"; Transliteration: "Koyuki Dokkidokki Hatsu Omusubi de Arimasu" (Japanese: 小雪 ドッキドッキ初おむすび であります)	August 5, 2005
71	"Wicked! Bewitched! Legend of the King who Forgets to Do His Homework (The Backup Planet!)"; Transliteration: "Gokuaku! Meiwaku! Uchū Shukudai Wasure Ō Densetsu de Arimasu" (Japanese: 極悪！迷惑！ 宇宙宿題忘れ王伝説 であります)	August 12, 2005
72	"Keroro Ironman Chef Challenge (I Pity Da Food!)"; Transliteration: "Keroro Tetsujin Shefu no Chōsenjō de Arimasu" (Japanese: ケロロ 鉄人シェフの挑戦状 であります)	August 19, 2005
72	"Tamama Strongest Soldier Challenge (Beetlemania!)"; Transliteration: "Tamama Saikyō Senshi no Chōsenjō desū de Arimasu" (Japanese: タママ 最強戦士の挑戦状ですぅ であります)	August 19, 2005
73	"Fuyuki 198X: Our Summer Vacation (Flux Capacitor? I Hardly Flux Ca-Know It-Her!)"; Transliteration: "Fuyuki 198X Bokutachi no Natsuyasumi de Arimasu" (Japanese: 冬樹 198X・僕たちの夏休み であります)	August 26, 2005
74	"Surprising - Special Version, Gerogero 30 Minutes, 15 Stories"; Transliteration: "Atto Odorokū Tokubetsu Kikaku Gerogero Sanjūbun de Arimasu" (Japanese: あっと驚く～特別企画 ゲロゲロ30分 であります)	September 2, 2005
75	"Momoka Awaken! Third Momoka (Me, Myself and I'm Mean!)"; Transliteration: "Momoka Kakusei! Sanbanme no Momoka de Arimasu" (Japanese: 桃華 覚醒！三番目の桃華 であります)	September 9, 2005
76	"Keroro Platoon Please Take Me to the Moon (To the Moon, Palace!)"; Transliteration: "Keroro Shōtai Watashi o Tsuki e Tsuretette de Arimasu" (Japanese: ケロロ小隊 私を月へ連れてって であります)	September 16, 2005
77	"Tamama Am I Really Getting Married? (The Red String Theory!)"; Transliteration: "Tamama Kekkon suru tte Hontō desu ka de Arimasu" (Japanese: タママ 結婚するって本当ですか であります)	September 23, 2005
77	"Tamama Sealing Tamama Impact (Buried-Deep Impact)"; Transliteration: "Tamama Fūin Tamama Inpakuto de Arimasu" (Japanese: タママ 封印タママインパクト であります)	September 23, 2005
78	"Keroro Treasure Hunting Should Be Carried Out On a Treasure Island (Frogs of the Bermuda Triangle!)"; Transliteration: "Keroro Takara Sagashi wa Yappa Takarajima da yo ne de Arimasu" (Japanese: ケロロ 宝さがしはやっぱ宝島だよね であります)	September 30, 2005
79	"Fuyuki Do Not Give Up For the Sports Meet (Anchor's a Waste)"; Transliteration: "Fuyuki Undōkai wa Akiramenai de Arimasu" (Japanese: 冬樹 運動会はあきらめない であります)	October 7, 2005
79	"Giroro I Know What a Cat Is (A Picture is Worth a Thousand Purrs!)"; Transliteration: "Giroro Neko wa Shitteru de Arimasu" (Japanese: ギロロ 猫は知ってる であります)	October 7, 2005
80	"Keroro Oh My, Running Away From Home is So Lonely"; Transliteration: "Keroro Iyā Iede tte Honto Sabishii Mon desu ne de Arimasu" (Japanese: ケロロ いや～家出ってホント寂しいもんですね であります)	October 14, 2005
81	"Giroro Red-Faced Days Full of Willpower"; Transliteration: "Giroro Makkana Dokonjō no Hibi de Arimasu" (Japanese: ギロロ 真っ赤なド根性の日々 であります)	October 21, 2005
81	"Fight, Koyuki! Protect Your Loved Ones"; Transliteration: "Tatakae Koyuki! Taisetsu na Hito o Mamoru ta me ni de Arimasu" (Japanese: 戦え小雪！ 大切な人を守るために であります)	October 21, 2005
82	"Mutsumi Want to Be On My Radio?"; Transliteration: "Mutsumi Boku no Rajio ni de nai? de Arimasu" (Japanese: 623 僕のラジオにでない？ であります)	October 28, 2005
82	"Keroro vs. Natsumi 1/6 Model Battle!"; Transliteration: "Keroro tai Natsumi Rokubun-no-Ichi Gachinko Batoru! de Arimasu" (Japanese: ケロロVS夏美 1/6ガチンコバトル！ であります)	October 28, 2005
83	"Keroro, Mixed Hot Springs Murder Incident. The Spirit of the Most Unfortunate Sibling in Space. Because of Brother's Colored Box Hot Spring, Only One Foot Can Be Placed Inside. When the Brother Slipped From the Shock and Fell Unconscious, The Sister's Tears Fell like Flower Petals"; Transliteration: "Keroro Onsen Kon'yoku Rotenburo Satsujin Jiken. Yukemuri ni Sasurau Uchū Ichi Fukō na Kyōdai no Tamashii. Ani ga Tsukutta Karābokkusu Onsen. Iza Nyūrou to Sureba Kataashi hika Hain Nakute, Shokku de Ashi o Suberaseta Ani ga Kizetsu suru Toki, Yunohana ni Imōto no Namida ga Mai Ochiru. de Arimasu" (Japanese: ケロロ 温泉混浴露天風呂殺人事件 湯煙にさすらう宇宙一不幸な兄妹の魂 兄が作ったカラーボックス温泉 いざ入ろうとすれば片足しか入んなくて、ショックで足を滑らせた兄が気絶するとき、湯の花に妹の涙が舞い落ちる であります)	November 4, 2005
83	"Kururu, the Most Dislikeable Guy"; Transliteration: "Kururu Tokoton Iya na Yatsu de Arimasu" (Japanese: クルル とことん嫌なヤツ であります)	November 4, 2005
84	"Momoka: Want to Eat Lunch in Space?"; Transliteration: "Momoka: Chotto Uchū de Ranchi demo de Arimasu" (Japanese: 桃華 ちょっと宇宙でランチでも であります)	November 11, 2005
84	"Keroro: Protect the Mushrooms!"; Transliteration: "Keroro: Matsutake o Kare! de Arimasu" (Japanese: ケロロ 松茸を狩れ！ であります)	November 11, 2005
85	"Keroro Turn Once and Switch Bodies"; Transliteration: "Keroro Gashatto Mawaseba Irekawari de Arimasu" (Japanese: ケロロ ガシャッとまわせばいれかわり であります)	November 18, 2005
85	"Natsumi Turns Into a Magical Girl..."; Transliteration: "Natsumi Mahō Shōjo ni Naretara...de Arimasu" (Japanese: 夏美 魔法少女になれたら… であります)	November 18, 2005
86	"Natsumi and Fuyuki Stay with the Devilish Hinata Family"; Transliteration: "Fuyuki & Natsumi Akuma no Sumu Hinataka de Arimasu" (Japanese: 冬樹＆夏美 悪魔のすむ日向家 であります)	November 25, 2005
86	"Keroro Turns Into A Super Hero!"; Transliteration: "Keroro Nare! Sūpā Hīrō ni de Arimasu" (Japanese: ケロロ なれ！スーパーヒーローに であります)	November 25, 2005
87	"Keroro, Best Wishes! Happy Birthday"; Transliteration: "Keroro Iwae! Happībāsudei de Arimasu" (Japanese: ケロロ 祝え！ハッピーバースデイ であります)	December 9, 2005
87	"Mois, Mois in Wonderland"; Transliteration: "Moa Fushigi no Kuni no Moa de Arimasu" (Japanese: モア 不思議の国のモア であります)	December 9, 2005
88	"Dasonu Maso Pekopon Received!"; Transliteration: "Dasonu Maso Pekopon wa Moratta! Butcha Ke Hoshiku mo Nai Kedo ne de Arimasu" (Japanese: ダソヌ☆マソ ペコポンはもらった！ ブッチャ毛ほしくもないけどね であります)	December 16, 2005
89	"Giroro The Man with Seven Faces"; Transliteration: "Giroro Nanatsu no Kao no Otoko da ze de Arimasu" (Japanese: ギロロ 七つの顔の男だぜ であります)	December 23, 2005
89	"Fuyuki Serve It On! Frog Meet"; Transliteration: "Fuyuki Moriagare! Okaruto Taikai de Arimasu" (Japanese: 冬樹 盛り上がれ！オカルト大会 であります)	December 23, 2005
90	"Keroro I Cannot Say Merry Christmas"; Transliteration: "Keroro Merī Kurisumasu ga Ienakute de Arimasu" (Japanese: ケロロ メリークリスマスが言えなくて であります)	December 30, 2005
91	"Keroro, the New Year, Birth of New Keroro"; Transliteration: "Keroro Shinnen: Shinsei Keroro Tanjō de Arimasu" (Japanese: ケロロ 新年・新生ケロロ誕生 であります)	January 6, 2006
91	"Koyuki, Granny Is Coming"; Transliteration: "Koyuki Obaachan ga Yattekita de Arimasu" (Japanese: 小雪 おばあちゃんがやって来た であります)	January 6, 2006
92	"Keroro Platoon Love Transcends the Sky"; Transliteration: "Keroro Shōtai Ōzora yori Ai o Komete de Arimasu" (Japanese: ケロロ小隊 大空より愛をこめて であります)	January 13, 2006
92	"Momoka vs. Mois Battle Clash"; Transliteration: "Momoka tai Moa Gekitotsu wa Netsuki Batoru de Arimasu" (Japanese: 桃華対モア 激突はねつきバトル であります)	January 13, 2006
93	"Natsumi Delves Into the Secret Basement!"; Transliteration: "Natsumi Shinnyū! Himitsu Kichi de Arimasu" (Japanese: 夏美 侵入！秘密基地 であります)	January 20, 2006
93	"Aki Hinata, Probably the Strongest Woman In Space"; Transliteration: "Hinata Aki Tabun Uchū Saikyō no Onna de Arimasu" (Japanese: 日向秋 たぶん宇宙最強の女 であります)	January 20, 2006
94	"Karara & Taruru Receive Pekopon!"; Transliteration: "Karara & Taruru Pekopon o Moratchaou! de Arimasu" (Japanese: カララ＆タルル ペコポンをもらっちゃおう！ であります)	January 27, 2006
95	"Natsumi Giroro Separates? Rescue Mission Till Death"; Transliteration: "Natsumi Giroro Chiru? Kesshi no Kyūshutsu Sakusen de Arimasu" (Japanese: 夏美 ギロロ散る？ 決死の救出作戦 であります)	February 3, 2006
96	"More Peach Summer Snow the Decisive Valentine Struggle"; Transliteration: "Moa Pīchi Samā Sunō Kessen Barentain de Arimasu" (Japanese: モアピーチサマースノー 決戦バレンタイン であります)	February 10, 2006
96	"Keroro, An Extremely Sorrowful Tale"; Transliteration: "Keroro Yonimo Fukō na Monogatari de Arimasu" (Japanese: ケロロ 世にも不幸な物語 であります)	February 10, 2006
97	"Momoka, An Ultimate Enemy Is a Difficult One to Read"; Transliteration: "Momoka Kyōteki to Kaite "Tomo" to Yomu de Arimasu" (Japanese: 桃華 強敵と書いて"とも"と読む であります)	February 17, 2006
97	"Keroro & Fuyuki, Just Us Two..."; Transliteration: "Keroro & Fuyuki Futari de... de Arimasu" (Japanese: ケロロ＆冬樹 ふたりで… であります)	February 17, 2006
98	"Momoka the Grand Running Away From Home Strategy"; Transliteration: "Momoka Kakeochi Daisakusen de Arimasu" (Japanese: 桃華 駆け落ち大作戦 であります)	February 24, 2006
98	"Dororo and Koyuki An Encounter to Remember"; Transliteration: "Dororo Ando Koyuki Deai no Kioku de Arimasu" (Japanese: ドロロ＆小雪 出会いの記憶 であります)	February 24, 2006
99	"Nastumi Nacchi the Good Dog"; Transliteration: "Natsumi Meiken Natchī de Arimasu" (Japanese: 夏美 名犬ナッチー であります)	March 3, 2006
99	"Keroro A Keropper's Naughtiness"; Transliteration: "Keroro Wanpaku Keroppā de Arimasu" (Japanese: ケロロ わんぱくケロッパー であります)	March 3, 2006
100	"Keroro Platoon Eh? Who Am...I? Who Is...Everyone?"; Transliteration: "Keroro E? Waga Tomogara...Dare? Minna...Dare? de Arimasu" (Japanese: ケロロ え？我が輩…誰？みんな…誰？ であります)	March 10, 2006
101	"The Keroro Platoon the Day Pekopon Stood Still!?"; Transliteration: "Keroro Shōtai Pekopon ga Seishisuru Hi!? de Arimasu" (Japanese: ケロロ小隊 ペコポンが静止する日!? であります)	March 17, 2006
102	"The Keroro Platoon Pekopon!! Impending Destruction of a Loved Planet!!"; Transliteration: "Keroro Shōtai Pekopon!! Horobi Yuku ka Ai no Hoshi yo!! de Arimasu" (Japanese: ケロロ小隊 ペコポン!!滅び行くか愛の星よ!! であります)	March 24, 2006
103	"Keroro Platoon the Sincerity That You Showed Me"; Transliteration: "Keroro Shōtai Magokoro o Kimi ni de Arimasu" (Japanese: ケロロ小隊 まごころを君に であります)	March 31, 2006

=== Season 3 (2006–07) ===
No.	Title	Original release date
104	"Keroro Farewell, My Dear Keroro!"; Transliteration: "Keroro Saraba Itoshiki Keroro! de Arimasu" (Japanese: ケロロ さらば愛しきケロロ！ であります)	April 7, 2006
104	"Keroro Countdown To Ruin"; Transliteration: "Keroro Metsubō e no Kauntodaun de Arimasu" (Japanese: ケロロ 滅亡へのカウントダウン であります)	April 7, 2006
105	"Keroro The Monumental Depths Of a Smile Sale!"; Transliteration: "Keroro Shinsō Kaiten Sumairu Sēru! de Arimasu" (Japanese: ケロロ 新装開店スマイルセール！ であります)	April 14, 2006
105	"Momoka, The Grand Cherry Blossom Viewing Love-Love Strategy!"; Transliteration: "Momoka Ohanami de Raburabu Dairansen! de Arimasu" (Japanese: 桃華 お花見でラブラブ大乱戦！ であります)	April 14, 2006
106	"Fuyuki And Natsumi Convenient Invaders"; Transliteration: "Fuyuki And Natsumi Katte ni Shinnyūsha de Arimasu" (Japanese: 冬樹＆夏美 勝手に侵入者 であります)	April 21, 2006
106	"Giroro, A Time For Hobbies"; Transliteration: "Giroro Shumi no Jikan de Arimasu" (Japanese: ギロロ 趣味の時間 であります)	April 21, 2006
107	"Natsumi The Dreaded Health Inspection"; Transliteration: "Natsumi Kyōfu no Karada Kensa de Arimasu" (Japanese: 夏美 恐怖の身体検査 であります)	April 28, 2006
107	"Fuyuki And Natsumi The Grand Sibling War!"; Transliteration: "Fuyuki Ando Natsumi Kyōdai Daisensō! de Arimasu" (Japanese: 冬樹＆夏美 姉弟大戦争！ であります)	April 28, 2006
108	"Tamama Monopoly! A Time For Adults"; Transliteration: "Tamama Dokusen! Otona no Jikan" (Japanese: タママ 独占！オトナの時間 であります)	May 5, 2006
108	"Fuyuki And Momoka The Island Of Doctor Kululu"; Transliteration: "Fuyuki Ando Momoka Dokutā Kururu no Shima de Arimasu" (Japanese: 冬樹＆桃華 ドクタークルルの島 であります)	May 5, 2006
109	"Keroro Mama's Grand Rejuvenation"; Transliteration: "Keroro Mama-dono Iyashikei Daisakusen de Arimasu" (Japanese: ケロロ ママ殿癒し系大作戦 であります)	May 12, 2006
109	"Dororo Silently Running Wild On the Galaxy Express"; Transliteration: "Dororo Chinmoku no Bōsō Ginga Tokkyū de Arimasu" (Japanese: ドロロ 沈黙の暴走銀河特急 であります)	May 12, 2006
110	"Keroro Quite Possibly the Best Medicine Ever"; Transliteration: "Keroro Sukoshi Fushigi na Tokkōyaku de Arimasu" (Japanese: ケロロ すこしふしぎな特効薬 であります)	May 19, 2006
110	"Keroro All Paths Lead To Starfruit!"; Transliteration: "Keroro Subete no Michi wa Sutāfurūtsu e Tsuzuku! de Arimasu" (Japanese: ケロロ すべての道はスターフルーツへ続く！ であります)	May 19, 2006
111	"Koyuki A Shinobi Pajama Party"; Transliteration: "Koyuki Shinobiryū Pajama Pātī de Arimasu" (Japanese: 小雪 忍流パジャマパーティー であります)	May 26, 2006
111	"Natsumi The Shocking Teacher's Visit!"; Transliteration: "Natsumi Dokkiri Katei Hōmon! de Arimasu" (Japanese: 夏美 ドッキリ家庭訪問！ であります)	May 26, 2006
112	"Kululu & Saburo The Artist's Decisive Encounter!"; Transliteration: "Kururu & Saburō Deai wa Oekaki Gachinko Shōbu! de Arimasu" (Japanese: クルル＆サブロー 出会いはお絵かきガチンコ勝負!であります)	June 2, 2006
113	"Keroro Battling Our Wettol King"; Transliteration: "Keroro Tatakae Bokura no Wettoru Kingu de Arimasu" (Japanese: ケロロ 戦え僕らのウェットルキング であります)	June 9, 2006
113	"Natsumi The Return of Wettol King"; Transliteration: "Natsumi Kaettekita Wettoru Kingu de Arimasu" (Japanese: 夏美 帰ってきたウェットルキング であります)	June 9, 2006
114	"Giroro My Way Of Getting Revenge!"; Transliteration: "Giroro Adauchisuru wa Ware ni Ari! de Arimasu" (Japanese: ギロロ あだ討ちするはわれにあり！ であります)	June 16, 2006
114	"Keroro Dasonu Maso Again and Again and Again?"; Transliteration: "Keroro Matamatamata Dasonu Maso? de Arimasu" (Japanese: ケロロ またまたまたダソヌ☆マソ？ であります)	June 16, 2006
115	"Keroro Nyororo vs. Mecha Nyororo"; Transliteration: "Keroro Nyororo tai Mekanyororo de Arimasu" (Japanese: ケロロ ニョロロ対メカニョロロ であります)	June 23, 2006
115	"Keroro Gone with the Nyobo"; Transliteration: "Keroro Nyobo totomoni Sarinu de Arimasu" (Japanese: ケロロ ニョボと共に去りぬ であります)	June 23, 2006
116	"Keroro Aiming For That Shining Flow!"; Transliteration: "Keroro Pikafuro o Nerae! de Arimasu" (Japanese: ケロロ ピカフロをねらえ！ であります)	June 30, 2006
116	"Mois A Diary About Uncle"; Transliteration: "Moa Ojisama Nikki de Arimasu" (Japanese: モア おじさま日記 であります)	June 30, 2006
117	"Keroro Wishes On Tanabata"; Transliteration: "Keroro Tanabata ni Negai o! de Arimasu" (Japanese: ケロロ 七夕に願いを！ であります)	July 7, 2006
117	"Keroro Revival! The Extraordinarily Talented Dopamine"; Transliteration: "Keroro Fukkatsu! Kaiketsu Dōpamin de Arimasu" (Japanese: ケロロ 復活！怪傑ドーパミン であります)	July 7, 2006
118	"Ghost Girl Let's Go To School"; Transliteration: "Yūrei-chan Gakkō e Yukou de Arimasu" (Japanese: 幽霊ちゃん 学校へ行こう であります)	July 14, 2006
118	"Kululu The Sergeant Major Of Curry"; Transliteration: "Kururu Karē no Sōchōsama de Arimasu" (Japanese: クルル カレーの曹長さま であります)	July 14, 2006
119	"Giroro How Grand! Summer Training Camp"; Transliteration: "Giroro Sōzetsu! Natsu Gasshuku de Arimasu" (Japanese: ギロロ 壮絶！ 夏合宿 であります)	July 21, 2006
119	"Keroro Capturing a Late Saturday Night's Shine!"; Transliteration: "Keroro Doyō no Ushinohi o Tsukamaero! de Arimasu" (Japanese: ケロロ 土曜の丑の日をつかまえろ！ であります)	July 21, 2006
120	"Keroro Doinaka Coast Returns"; Transliteration: "Keroro Doinaka Kaigan Ritānzu de Arimasu" (Japanese: ケロロ 土井中海岸リターンズ であります)	July 28, 2006
120	"Momoka One Summer Experience"; Transliteration: "Momoka Hito Natsu no Keiken de Arimasu" (Japanese: 桃華 ひと夏の経験 であります)	July 28, 2006
121	"Dororo Lady Ninja Karara Appears!"; Transliteration: "Dororo Kunoichi Karara Shushutto Sanjō! de Arimasu" (Japanese: ドロロ くの一カララ シュシュッと参上！ であります)	August 4, 2006
122	"Kululu The Cursed DVD"; Transliteration: "Kururu Noroi no DVD de Arimasu" (Japanese: クルル 呪いのＤＶＤ であります)	August 11, 2006
122	"Natsumi By All Means, What is This Prohibition!"; Transliteration: "Natsumi Nani ga Nan demo Kinshi yo! de Arimasu" (Japanese: 夏美 何がなんでも禁止よ！ であります)	August 11, 2006
123	"Visiting Grandma Hinata's House"; Transliteration: "Hinataka Satogaeri de Arimasu" (Japanese: 日向家 里帰り であります)	August 18, 2006
123	"Tamama and the Turtle"; Transliteration: "Tamama to Kame de Arimasu" (Japanese: タママとカメ であります)	August 18, 2006
124	"Keroro The Summer's Treasure"; Transliteration: "Keroro Natsu no Takaramono de Arimasu" (Japanese: ケロロ 夏の宝物 であります)	August 25, 2006
125	"Keroro Morally Spinning Sushi!"; Transliteration: "Keroro Jinginaki Kaiten Sushi! de Arimasu" (Japanese: ケロロ 仁義なき回転寿司！ であります)	September 1, 2006
125	"Keroro The Dreaded Mosquito"; Transliteration: "Keroro Kyōfu no Za Mosukīto de Arimasu" (Japanese: ケロロ 恐怖のザ・モスキート であります)	September 1, 2006
126	"Keroro And Natsumi Which Way to Heroes?!"; Transliteration: "Keroro Ando Natsumi Yūsha wa Dotchi da?! de Arimasu" (Japanese: ケロロ＆夏美 勇者はどっちだ？！ であります)	September 8, 2006
127	"Keroro Secret Moon Vacation"; Transliteration: "Keroro Kossori Tsuki Ryokō de Arimasu" (Japanese: ケロロ こっそり月旅行 であります)	September 15, 2006
127	"Giroro Typhoon Invasion Operation Commences!"; Transliteration: "Giroro Taifū Shinryaku Sakusen Kekkō! de Arimasu" (Japanese: ギロロ 台風侵略作戦決行！ であります)	September 15, 2006
128	"Keroro Finally Prays to God?"; Transliteration: "Keroro Saigo wa Honki de Kamidanomi? de Arimasu" (Japanese: ケロロ 最後は本気で神頼み？ であります)	September 22, 2006
129	"Kiruru. The Messenger of Destruction"; Transliteration: "Kiruru Hametsu no Shisha de Arimasu" (Japanese: キルル 破滅の使者 であります)	September 29, 2006
130	"Keroro Platoon All Members Reboot!"; Transliteration: "Keroro Shōtai Zen'in Saikidō! de Arimasu" (Japanese: ケロロ小隊 全員再起動！ であります)	October 6, 2006
130	"Garuru Platoon Everyone Fight!"; Transliteration: "Garuru Shōtai Kakusen Eri de Arimasu" (Japanese: ガルル小隊 かく戦えり であります)	October 6, 2006
131	"Giroro A Secret Day Off"; Transliteration: "Giroro Himitsu no Kyūjitsu" (Japanese: ギロロ 秘密の休日 であります)	October 13, 2006
131	"Baio Conquer the Sports Festival"; Transliteration: "Baio Undōkai o Shihai seyo de Arimasu" (Japanese: 梅雄 運動会を支配せよ であります)	October 13, 2006
132	"Dororo The Chance is Important!"; Transliteration: "Dororo Kikkake ga Daiji! de Arimasu" (Japanese: ドロロ キッカケが大事！ であります)	October 20, 2006
132	"Natsumi My Bluebird"; Transliteration: "Natsumi Watashi no Aoi Tori de Arimasu" (Japanese: 夏美 私の青い鳥 であります)	October 20, 2006
133	"Alisa Hunter of Darkness, Halloween in Chaos!"; Transliteration: "Arisa Yami no Karyūdo Harowin Daisōdō! de Arimasu" (Japanese: アリサ 闇の狩人 ハロウィン大騒動！ であります)	October 27, 2006
134	"Keroro If You Catch a Cold, It'll be Fixed in Post!?"; Transliteration: "Keroro Kaze o Hiitara Afureko da!? de Arimasu" (Japanese: ケロロ 風邪をひいたらアフレコだ！？ であります)	November 3, 2006
134	"Fuyuki & Kururu Go to Akihabara"; Transliteration: "Fuyuki & Kururu Akihabara o Yuku de Arimasu" (Japanese: 冬樹&クルル 秋葉原を行く であります)	November 3, 2006
135	"Karara And Chiroro The Shichi-Go-San of Nagomi"; Transliteration: "Karara Ando Chiroro Shichigosan ni Nagomi-san! de Arimasu" (Japanese: カララ＆チロロ 七五三に７５３さん！ であります)	November 10, 2006
135	"Keroro It's Only One Grain Left"; Transliteration: "Keroro Taka ga Hitotsubu Saredo Hitosubu de Arimasu" (Japanese: ケロロ たかが1粒されど1粒 であります)	November 10, 2006
136	"Aki War at the Onsen!"; Transliteration: "Aki Onsen de Daikassen! de Arimasu" (Japanese: 秋 温泉で大合戦！ であります)	November 17, 2006
136	"Keroro Go! Keroropan"; Transliteration: "Keroro Soreike! Keroropan de Arimasu" (Japanese: ケロロ それいけ！ケロロパン であります)	November 17, 2006
137	"Keroro It's a Field Trip Until You Say I'm Home!"; Transliteration: "Keroro Tadaima! Toiu Made ga Ensoku da! de Arimasu" (Japanese: ケロロ ただいま！と言うまでが遠足だ！ であります)	November 24, 2006
137	"Keroro Sukiyaki of Love and Sorrow"; Transliteration: "Keroro Ai to Kanashimi no Sukiyaki de Arimasu" (Japanese: ケロロ 愛と悲しみのスキヤキ であります)	November 24, 2006
138	"Keroro Keroro Show"; Transliteration: "Keroro Keroro Shō de Arimasu" (Japanese: ケロロ ケロロショー であります)	December 8, 2006
138	"Fuyuki & Chiruyo KGS Returns"; Transliteration: "Fuyuki & Chiruyo KGS Futatabi de Arimasu" (Japanese: 冬樹＆散世 KGS再び であります)	December 8, 2006
139	"Kogoro Central Tokyo is a Man's Battlefield"; Transliteration: "Kogorō Oku Tōkyō-shi wa Otoko no Senjō de Arimasu" (Japanese: ５５６ 奥東京市は男の戦場 であります)	December 15, 2006
140	"Keroro Platoon Super Battle Operation: Tax Return"; Transliteration: "Keroro Shōtai Nenmatsu Chōsei Daisakusen de Arimasu" (Japanese: ケロロ小隊 年末調整大作戦 であります)	December 22, 2006
140	"Keroro A Certain Man's Fight"; Transliteration: "Keroro Aru Otoko no Tatakai" (Japanese: ケロロ ある男の戦い であります)	December 22, 2006
141	"Keroro Central Tokyo's Ice Age Alisa Has Come"; Transliteration: "Keroro Oku Tōkyō Hyōgaki Arisa ga Kita! de Arimasu" (Japanese: ケロロ 奥東京氷河期 アリサが来た！ であります)	December 29, 2006
142	"Keroro Give Me Back My New Year"; Transliteration: "Keroro Oshōgatsu o Kaeshite! de Arimasu" (Japanese: ケロロ お正月を返して！ であります)	January 5, 2007
142	"Giroro Let's Get Working on the Pekopon Invasion!"; Transliteration: "Giroro Shigoto Hajime wa Pekopon Shinryaku! de Arimasu" (Japanese: ギロロ 仕事初めはペコポン侵略！ であります)	January 5, 2007
143	"Keroro Miracle?! Keroro's Father."; Transliteration: "Keroro Kiseki!? Keroro no Chichi de Arimasu" (Japanese: ケロロ 奇跡！？ケロロの父 であります)	January 12, 2007
143	"Hinata House Submerged!?"; Transliteration: "Hinataka Chinbotsu!? de Arimasu" (Japanese: 日向家 沈没！？ であります)	January 12, 2007
144	"Keroro A Bold-Faced Fake Fairytale The Ear's Conundrum"; Transliteration: "Keroro Tetsu Kamen Densetsu Nazo no Dekamimi de Arimasu" (Japanese: ケロロ 鉄仮面伝説 謎のデカ耳 であります)	January 19, 2007
145	"Urere the Salesman Invader"; Transliteration: "Urere Urekko Shinryakusha de Arimasu" (Japanese: ウレレ 売れっ子侵略者 であります)	January 26, 2007
145	"Keroro And Then Nonetheless There Were None"; Transliteration: "Keroro Soshite Yappari Dare mo Inakunatta de Arimasu" (Japanese: ケロロ そしてやっぱり誰もいなくなった であります)	January 26, 2007
146	"Pluto, do you remember it?" Transliteration: "Mei Oboete Imasu ka? de Arimasu" (Japanese: 冥 おぼえていますか？ であります)	February 2, 2007
147	"Paul A Butler's Honor"; Transliteration: "Pōru Shitsuji no Ichibun de Arimasu" (Japanese: ポール 執事の一分 であります)	February 9, 2007
147	"Giroro who gave me this?" Transliteration: "Giroro Kureta no wa Dare? de Arimasu" (Japanese: ギロロ くれたのは誰？ であります)	February 9, 2007
148	"Koyuki Jidaigeki Wonderland!"; Transliteration: "Koyuki Jidaigeki Wandārando! de Arimasu" (Japanese: 小雪 時代劇ワンダーランド！ であります)	February 16, 2007
148	"Keroro jumps to Chubei!"; Transliteration: "Keroro Chūbeesama ni Tobitsukou! de Arimasu" (Japanese: ケロロ チュー兵衛様に飛びつこう！ であります)	February 16, 2007
149	"Alisa Alien Versus Monster"; Transliteration: "Arisa Eirian tai Monsutā de Arimasu" (Japanese: アリサ エイリアン対モンスター であります)	February 23, 2007
150	"Giroro An Established Time to Journey"; Transliteration: "Giroro Tabidachi no Toki de Arimasu" (Japanese: ギロロ 旅立ちのとき であります)	March 2, 2007
151	"Chiruyo Checking up on White Day"; Transliteration: "Chiruyo Howaitodē o Chekku! de Arimasu" (Japanese: 散世 ホワイトデーをチェック！ であります)	March 9, 2007
151	"Fuyuki I Know How to Use The Application"; Transliteration: "Fuyuki Goriyō wa Keikakuteki ni de Arimasu" (Japanese: 冬樹 ご利用は計画的に であります)	March 9, 2007
152	"Keroro Frequent Appearance! Planet Andou's Heaven"; Transliteration: "Keroro Shutsubotsu! Adosei kku Tengoku de Arimasu" (Japanese: ケロロ 出没！アド星ック天国 であります)	March 16, 2007
153	"Kerokero Military Operation Number 100"; Transliteration: "Kerokero Sakusen Daihyakugō de Arimasu" (Japanese: ケロケロ作戦 第１００号 であります)	March 23, 2007
154	"Keroro Farewell Sergeant Keroro"; Transliteration: "Keroro Saraba Keroro Gunsō de Arimasu" (Japanese: ケロロ さらばケロロ軍曹 であります)	March 30, 2007

=== Season 4 (2007–08) ===
No.	Title	Original release date
155	"Keroro Platoon, Cut a Good Tune!/Keroro Platoon, Big Resonance!"; Transliteration: "Keroro Shōtai zekkōchō! de Arimasu/Keroro Shōtai Daikyōmei! de Arimasu" (Japanese: ケロロ小隊 絶好調！ であります/ケロロ小隊 大共鳴！ であります)	7 April 2007
156	"Keroro, Unite! Keroro Robo/Keroro Invasion! Cherry Blossom Frontline Extreme!"; Transliteration: "Keroro Gattai! Keroro Robo de Arimasu/Keroro Shinryaku! Sakura Saizensen! de Arimasu" (Japanese: ケロロ 合体！ケロロロボ であります/ケロロ 侵略！桜最前線！ であります)	14 April 2007
157	"Leave it to Chief Medic Pururu!/Natsumi, Today's Fortune"; Transliteration: "Pururu Kangochō ni Omakase!/Natsumi Kyō no Uranai de Arimasu" (Japanese: プルル 看護長におまかせ！ であります/夏美 今日の占い であります)	21 April 2007
158	"Keroro, Past Victories/Giroro, Exclude These Memories"; Transliteration: "Keroro Kako no Eikō de Arimasu/Giroro Kindan no Kioku de Arimasu" (Japanese: ケロロ 過去の栄光 であります/ギロロ 禁断の記憶 であります)	28 April 2007
159	"Keroro, Climax! Card Battle/Keroro, the Targeted Platoon"; Transliteration: "Keroro Hakunetsu! Kādo Batoru/Keroro Nerawareta Shōtai de Arimasu" (Japanese: ケロロ 白熱！カードバトル であります/ケロロ 狙われた小隊 であります)	5 May 2007
160	"Momoka, the Greatest Mother's Day"; Transliteration: "Momoka Saikyō no Haha no Hi de Arimasu" (Japanese: 桃華 最強の母の日 であります)	12 May 2007
161	"Putata and Mekeke, Overzealous Killers"; Transliteration: "Putata & Mekeke Hissatsu Oshigotojin de Arimasu" (Japanese: プタタ＆メケケ 必殺お仕事人 であります)	19 May 2007
162	"Chibi Kero, That Time, Joriri"; Transliteration: "Chibi Kero Ano Koro Joriri de Arimasu" (Japanese: ちびケロ あのころジョリリ であります)	26 May 2007
163	"Natsumi, Goodbye Saburo/Fuyuki and Alisa, The Rain Monster"; Transliteration: "Natsumi Sayonara Saburō de Arimasu/Fuyuki & Arisa Ame no Kaibutsu de Arimasu" (Japanese: 夏美 さよならサブロー であります/冬樹＆アリサ 雨の怪物 であります)	2 June 2007
164	"Keroro, Nyororo Extinction?/Lavie, Goings of an Honorable Bride!"; Transliteration: "Keroro Nyororo Metsubō? de Arimasu/Rabī Oyome ni Ikimasu! de Arimasu" (Japanese: ケロロ ニョロロ滅亡？ であります/ラビー お嫁に行きます！ であります)	9 June 2007
165	"Kululu, Temporary Leader/Koyuki, Training as Usual"; Transliteration: "Kururu Rinji Taichō de Arimasu/Koyuki Futsū Mōtokkun de Arimasu" (Japanese: クルル 臨時隊長 であります/小雪 普通猛特訓 であります)	16 June 2007
166	"Keroro, Crush! Wettol Robo/Keroro, Assault! Wettol Human"; Transliteration: "Keroro Kudake! Wettoru Robo de Arimasu/Keroro Totsugeki! Wettoru Hyūman de Arimasu" (Japanese: ケロロくだけ！ウエットルロボであります/ケロロ突撃！ウエットルヒューマンであります)	23 June 2007
167	"556, Cup Ramen Recipe/Keroro, Capture! Crossword"; Transliteration: "Kogorō Kappumen no Tsukurikata de Arimasu/Keroro Kōryaku! Kurosuwādo de Arimasu" (Japanese: ５５６ カップメンの作り方 であります/ケロロ 攻略！クロスワード であります)	30 June 2007
168	"Keroro, Big Plan for Period Restriction/Momoka, My Limited Tanabata"; Transliteration: "Keroro Kikan Gentei Daishinryaku de Arimasu/Momoka Tanabata Gentei no Watashi de Arimasu" (Japanese: ケロロ 期間限定大侵略 であります/桃華 七夕限定の私 であります)	7 July 2007
169	"Urere, King of the Trains/Giroro, Beautiful Girl and the Liquid Keronian"; Transliteration: "Urere Densha no Ōsama de Arimasu/Giroro Bishōjo to Ekitai Keronjin de Arimasu" (Japanese: ウレレ 電車の王様 であります/ギロロ 美少女と液体ケロン人 であります)	14 July 2007
170	"Fuyuki and Keroro, Inaccurate! Seven Wonders/Pururu and Chiruyo, Secret Friends"; Transliteration: "Fuyuki & Keroro Abake! Nana Fushigi de Arimasu/Pururu & Chiruyo Himitsu no Tomodachi de Arimasu" (Japanese: 冬樹＆ケロロ あばけ！七不思議 であります/プルル＆散世 秘密の友達 であります)	21 July 2007
171	"Tamama, To Rebel Is Regrettable/Kululu, When Was He a House Sitter?"; Transliteration: "Tamama Riyūnaki Hankō de Arimasu/Kururu to Orusuban? de Arimasu" (Japanese: タママ 理由なき反抗 であります/クルル と お留守番？ であります)	28 July 2007
172	"Alisa and Fuyuki, UMA Versus Dangal!"; Transliteration: "Arisa F fuyuki UMA tai Dangaru! de Arimasu" (Japanese: アリサ＆冬樹 ＵＭＡ対ダンガル！ であります)	4 August 2007
173	"Keroro, Yamato, and Kappa"; Transliteration: "Keroro Yamato to Kapū de Arinsu" (Japanese: ケロロ ヤマトとカプー でありんす)	11 August 2007
174	"Keroro, Butchered Hair, and the Afro Ondo?/Dororo, Mysterious Mountain"; Transliteration: "Keroro Buccha Ke, Afuro de ondo? de Arimasu/Dororo Fushigi no Yama de Arimasu" (Japanese: ケロロ ブッチャ毛、アフロで音頭？ であります/ドロロ 不思議の山 であります)	18 August 2007
175	"Keroro, Dive! Vinyl Pool/Fuyuki and Natsumi, A New Day Is Here"; Transliteration: "Keroro Tobikome! Binīru Pūru de Arimasu/Fuyuki & Natsumi Atarashii Asa ga Kita de Arimasu" (Japanese: ケロロ 飛び込め！ビニールプール であります/冬樹＆夏美 新しい朝がきた であります)	25 August 2007
176	"Chibi Kero, Goodbye Summer Vacation!"; Transliteration: "Chibi Kero Saraba Natsuyasumi! de Arimasu" (Japanese: ちびケロ さらば夏休み！ であります)	1 September 2007
177	"Dokuku, Gas Keronian Number One/Keroro, Pekopon's Number One Gunpla Boy"; Transliteration: "Dokuku Gasu Keronjin Daiichigō de Arimasu/Keroro Pekopon Ichi no Ganpura Otoko de Arimasu" (Japanese: ドクク ガスケロン人第１号 であります/ケロロ ペコポン一のガンプラ男 であります)	8 September 2007
178	"Momoka and the Ghost, The Hinata Family's Phantom"; Transliteration: "Momoka Gōsuto Hinataka no Maboroshi de Arimasu" (Japanese: 桃華 ゴースト 日向家の幻 であります)	15 September 2007
179	"Keroro, Running An Election!/Natsumi and Giroro, The Two Who Can't Return"; Transliteration: "Keroro Shutsuba suru! de Arimasu/Natsumi & Giroro Kaerenai Futari de Arimasu" (Japanese: ケロロ 出馬する！ であります/夏美＆ギロロ 帰れない二人 であります)	22 September 2007
180	"Keroro, War is a Huge Hustle"; Transliteration: "Keroro Sōdatsu Daisensō de Arimasu" (Japanese: ケロロ 争奪大戦争 であります)	29 September 2007
181	"Mushishi, Search for the Insects!/Momoka, Three-Legged Race!"; Transliteration: "Mushishi Mushi no Idokoro o Sagase! de Arimasu/Momoka Sōdatsu! Nininsanyaku de Arimasu" (Japanese: ムシシ 虫の居所を探せ！ であります/桃華 争奪！二人三脚 であります)	6 October 2007
182	"Keroro, Buried Treasure Special/Tamama versus Tamama"; Transliteration: "Keroro Maizōkin Supesharu de Arimasu/Tamama tai Tamama de Arimasu" (Japanese: ケロロ 埋蔵金スペシャル であります/タママ対タママ であります)	13 October 2007
183	"Garuru, Repeated Bother, Vacation"; Transliteration: "Garuru Hata Meiwaku na Bakēshon de Arimasu" (Japanese: ガルル はた迷惑なバケーション であります)	20 October 2007
184	"Fuyuki, Burning Occult Article Ambition/Natsumi, Romeo and Juliet?"; Transliteration: "Fuyuki Moeagare Okaruto Bunkasai de Arimasu/Natsumi Romio to Jurietto? de Arimasu" (Japanese: 冬樹 燃え上がれオカルト文化祭 であります/夏美 ロミオとジュリエット？ であります)	27 October 2007
185	"Robobo, Big Mechanized Operation/Tamama, It's a Notebook"; Transliteration: "Robobo Kikaika Daisakusen de Arimasu/Tamama Nōto desū de Arimasu" (Japanese: ロボボ 機械化大作戦 であります/タママ ノートですぅ であります)	3 November 2007
186	"Arisa vs. the Ghost, Aggression is the Lack of Progress"; Transliteration: "Arisa tai Yōkai Shinryaku ga Susumanai de Arimasu" (Japanese: アリサVS妖怪 侵略が進まない であります)	10 November 2007
187	"Keroro, Thanksgiving's Working Ways/Keroro, Fight! WakiRanger"; Transliteration: "Keroro Kinrō o Kansha seyo de Arimasu/Keroro Tatakae! Wakirenjā de Arimasu" (Japanese: ケロロ 勤労を感謝せよ であります/ケロロ 戦え！ワキレンジャー であります)	17 November 2007
188	"Nuii, Don't Ever Leave Me!"; Transliteration: "Nuii Boku o Sutenai de! de Arimasu" (Japanese: ヌイイ ボクを捨てないで！ であります)	24 November 2007
189	"Dororo, The Assassin From the Past"; Transliteration: "Dororo Kako kara no Shikaku de Arimasu" (Japanese: ドロロ 過去からの刺客 であります)	8 December 2007
190	"Giroro, Target! The Present!/Keroro, The Big Birthday Party!"; Transliteration: "Giroro Mokuhyō! Purezento! de Arimasu/Keroro Tanjōbi Dai Pātī! de Arimasu" (Japanese: ギロロ 目標！プレゼント！ であります/ケロロ 誕生日大パーティー！ であります)	15 December 2007
191	"Keroro, He and Lullaby Legend/Keroro, Plastic Model King, Very Big Charge!"; Transliteration: "Keroro Aitsu to Rarabai Densetsu de Arimasu/Keroro Puramo Ō Daikessen! de Arimasu" (Japanese: ケロロ あいつとララバイ伝説 であります/ケロロ プラモ王大決戦！ であります)	22 December 2007
192	"Keroro, Prevent Christmas!/Keroro Platoon, A Cake Is a Man's Battlefield!"; Transliteration: "Keroro Kurisumasu o Bōshi seyo! de Arimasu/Keroro Shōtai Kēki wa Otoko no Senjō da! de Arimasu" (Japanese: ケロロ クリスマスを防止せよ！ であります/ケロロ小隊 ケーキは男の戦場だ！ であります)	29 December 2007
193	"Keroro, Hatsumōde Without Humility/Keroro, Sechira versus Zonira"; Transliteration: "Keroro Jingi naki Hatsumōde de Arimasu/Keroro Sechira tai Zonira de Arimasu" (Japanese: ケロロ 仁義なき初詣 であります/ケロロ セチラ対ゾニラ であります)	5 January 2008
194	"Toilet, Now, We Strike!/Kululu and a Puppy"; Transliteration: "Toire Ima, tachiagaru Toki! de Arimasu/Kururu to Koinu de Arimasu" (Japanese: トイレ 今、立上がるとき！ であります/クルルと子犬 であります)	12 January 2008
195	"Natsumi, I Said "I Want to Ski, Too"!/Keroro, Hot Spring, Tiring Tennis Match!"; Transliteration: "Natsumi Watashi mo Sukī ni Tsuretette! de Arimasu/Keroro Onsen ttsūtara Takkyū da! de Arimasu" (Japanese: 夏美 私もスキーに連れてって！ であります/ケロロ 温泉っつうたら卓球だ！ であります)	19 January 2008
196	"Keroro Special - Returned! Gero Gero 30 Minutes, 13 Stories"; Transliteration: "Kaettekita Gerogero Sanjū Bun de Arimasu" (Japanese: 帰ってきたゲロゲロ30分 であります)	26 January 2008
197	"Zeroro, Multiplying?/Keroro, I Want to Dig Holes!"; Transliteration: "Zeroro Fuesugi? de Arimasu/Keroro Ana ga Attara Horitai! de Arimasu" (Japanese: ゼロロ 増えすぎ？ であります/ケロロ 穴があったら掘りたい！ であります)	2 February 2008
198	"Chibi Kero, Little-Little Big Adventure!/Natsumi and Momoka, Obligation Chocolate Excluded!"; Transliteration: "Chibi Kero Chibichibi Daibōken! de Arimasu/Natsumi & Momoka Giri Choko Kinshi! de Arimasu" (Japanese: ちびケロ チビチビ大冒険！ であります/夏美＆桃華 義理チョコ禁止！ であります)	9 February 2008
199	"Kululu, Kululun Idol Legend/Keroro, Resetting My Mind!"; Transliteration: "Kururu Kururun Aidoru Densetsu de Arimasu/Keroro Shoshin ni Kaeru! de Arimasu" (Japanese: クルル クルルンアイドル伝説 であります/ケロロ 初心に帰る！ であります)	16 February 2008
200	"Keroro, Uru Has Come!"; Transliteration: "Keroro Urū ga Kuru! de Arimasu" (Japanese: ケロロ ウルーが来る！ であります)	23 February 2008
201	"Giroro, the Third of March is Ear Day?/Keroro, It's Not A Woman's Fight"; Transliteration: "Giroro Sangetsu Mikka wa Mimi no Hi? de Arimasu/Keroro Ja nakute Onna no Tatakai de Arimasu" (Japanese: ギロロ ３月３日は耳の日？ であります/ケロロ じゃなくて女の戦い であります)	1 March 2008
202	"Keroro, Attack! The Last Worker"; Transliteration: "Keroro Gekitō! Saigo no Oshigotojin de Arimasu" (Japanese: ケロロ 激闘！最後のお仕事人 であります)	8 March 2008
203	"Keroro, Shurara, Final Brawl!"; Transliteration: "Keroro Shurara Saishū Kessen! de Arimasu" (Japanese: ケロロ シュララ最終決戦！ であります)	15 March 2008
204	"Robo Kogoro/Keroro and Natsumi, Shelter From The Rain"; Transliteration: "Robo Kogorō de Arimasu/Keroro & Natsumi Amayadori de Arimasu" (Japanese: ロボ ５５６ であります/ケロロ＆夏美 雨宿り であります)	22 March 2008
205	"Keroro and Fuyuki, Another World"; Transliteration: "Keroro & Fuyuki Mō Hitotsu no Sekai de Arimasu" (Japanese: ケロロ＆冬樹 もうひとつの世界 であります)	29 March 2008

=== Season 5 (2008–09) ===
No.	Title	Original release date
206	"Keroro Platoon, Start the Color Operation!!/Dororo, Do You Like Natto?"; Transliteration: "Keroro Shōtai Iroiro Sakusen Kaishi!! de Arimasu/Dororo Nattō wa Osuki? de Arimasu" (Japanese: ケロロ小隊 色々作戦開始！！ であります/ドロロ 納豆はお好き？ であります)	April 5, 2008
207	"Keroro, Build A Company!/Ouka, Come With Cherry Blossoms"; Transliteration: "Keroro Kaisha o Tsukurou! de Arimasu/Sakura Sakura Totomoni Kuru de Arimasu" (Japanese: ケロロ 会社を作ろう！ であります/桜華 桜と共に来る であります)	April 12, 2008
208	"Giroro, A Man's Backup/Keroro, Great Economical Mobile Operation!"; Transliteration: "Giroro Otoko no Bakkuappu de Arimasu/Keroro Oena Keitai Daisakusen! de Arimasu" (Japanese: ギロロ オトコのバックアップ であります/ケロロ お得な携帯大作戦！ であります)	April 19, 2008
209	"Koyuki, I'll Stop Being A Shinobi"; Transliteration: "Koyuki Shinobi, Yame Masu de Arimasu" (Japanese: 小雪 忍び、やめます であります)	April 26, 2008
210	"Natsumi, Disturbance After School/Aki, Children's Day"; Transliteration: "Natsumi Konwaku no Hōkago de Arimasu/Aki Kodomo no Hi de Arimasu" (Japanese: 夏美 困惑の放課後 であります/秋 子供の日 であります)	May 3, 2008
211	"Musha Kero, Volume 1: Legendary Hero"; Transliteration: "Musha Kero Ichi no Maki Densetsu no Yūsha de Gozasōrō" (Japanese: 武者ケロ 壱の巻 伝説の勇者 でござ候)	May 10, 2008
212	"Keroro, Don't Look At That!/Kogoro vs. Space Superintendent"; Transliteration: "Keroro Soredake wa Minai de! de Arimasu/Kogorō tai Uchū Keishi de Arimasu" (Japanese: ケロロ それだけは見ないで！ であります/５５６ ＶＳ 宇宙警視 であります)	May 17, 2008
213	"Momoka, Reclaim Tomorrow!"; Transliteration: "Momoka Ashita o Torimodose! de Arimasu" (Japanese: 桃華 明日を取り戻せ！ であります)	May 23, 2008
214	"Kululu, I Quit/Pururu, Nurse In Love"; Transliteration: "Kururu Yame Masu de Arimasu/Pururu Koisuru Kangohei de Arimasu" (Japanese: クルル やめます であります/プルル恋する看護兵 であります)	May 31, 2008
215	"Keroro, The Eight Wettle Kings/Keroro, Gamma 3's Big Wet Idea"; Transliteration: "Keroro Hachinin no Wettoru Kingu de Arimasu/Keroro Gama Sangō Wetto Sakusen de Arimasu" (Japanese: ケロロ 8人のウェットルキング であります/ケロロ ガマ3号ウェット作戦 であります)	June 7, 2008
216	"Keroro, Compression Invasion?/Fuyuki, Legendary Things in The Hinata House"; Transliteration: "Keroro Asshuku de Shinryaku? de Arimasu/Fuyuki Hinataka Zaihō Densetsu de Arimasu" (Japanese: ケロロ 圧縮で侵略？ であります/冬樹 日向家財宝伝説 であります)	June 14, 2008
217	"Chibi Kero, The Forbidden Game/Keroro, Frightening Invaders"; Transliteration: "Chibi Kero Kinjirareta Asobi de Arimasu/Keroro Kyōfu no Shinryakusha de Arimasu" (Japanese: ちびケロ 禁じられた遊び であります/ケロロ 恐怖の侵略者 であります)	June 21, 2008
218	"Chibi Kero, Whisper of the Heart/Keroro, Caries War 2"; Transliteration: "Chibi Kero Mimi o Sumaseba de Arimasu/Keroro Kariesu Wō Tsū de Arimasu" (Japanese: ちびケロ 耳をすませば であります/ケロロ カリエスウォー2 であります)	June 28, 2008
219	"Musha Kero, Volume Two: Outburst of Laughter, Sengoku Comedian War!"; Transliteration: "Musha Kero Ni no Maki Bakushō! Sengoku Owarai Kassen ni Gozasōrō" (Japanese: 武者ケロ・弐の巻 爆笑！ 戦国お笑い合戦 にござ候)	July 5, 2008
220	"Keroro, What is Global Warming?/Sababa, Devil King of The Desert"; Transliteration: "Keroro Chikyūondanka tte Nani? de Arimasu/Sababa Sabaku no Maō de Arimasu" (Japanese: ケロロ 地球温暖化ってなぁに？ であります/サババ 砂漠の魔王 であります)	July 12, 2008
221	"Momoka, Decision on Sunday/Giroro, Decision on Sunday"; Transliteration: "Momoka Kessen wa Nichiyōbi de Arimasu/Giroro Kessen wa Nichiyōbi de Arimasu" (Japanese: 桃華 決戦は日曜日 であります/ギロロ 決戦は日曜日 であります)	July 19, 2008
222	"Keroro, Fishing Rice Cookies on Rainy Days/Keroro, Memories and Fireworks"; Transliteration: "Keroro Ame no Hi wa Senbei Tsuri! de Arimasu/Keroro Omoide to Hanabi de Arimasu" (Japanese: ケロロ 雨の日はせんべい釣り！ であります/ケロロ 思い出と花火 であります)	July 26, 2008
223	"Momoka, Desert Island Full of Women/Keroro, Frightening Red Shoes Operation"; Transliteration: "Momoka Onna Darake no Jujintō de Arimasu/Keroro Kyōfu no Akai Kutsu Sakusen de Arimasu" (Japanese: 桃華 女だらけの無人島 であります/ケロロ 恐怖の赤い靴作戦 であります)	August 2, 2008
224	"Keroro, Celebrity Resort Dragnet"; Transliteration: "Keroro Serebu Rizōto Sōsa Mō de Arimasu" (Japanese: ケロロ セレブリゾート捜査網 であります)	August 9, 2008
225	"Tamama, Beautiful Dive!/Keroro, The Ultimate Pekoponian Suit"; Transliteration: "Tamama Utsukushiki Daibu! de Arimasu/Keroro Kyūkyoku no Pekoponjin Sūtsu de Arimasu" (Japanese: タママ 美しきダイブ！ であります/ケロロ 究極のペコポン人スーツ であります)	August 16, 2008
226	"Fuyuki, From a Distant Ocean Came a Turtle"; Transliteration: "Fuyuki Tōi Umi kara Kita Kame de Arimasu" (Japanese: 冬樹 遠い海から来たカメ であります)	August 23, 2008
227	"Keroro and Natsumi, One Room"; Transliteration: "Keroro & Natsumi Hitotsu no Heya de Arimasu" (Japanese: ケロロ＆夏美 ひとつの部屋 であります)	August 30, 2008
228	"Meruru, Postal Ser～vice!/Fuyuki, A Break in the Parking Area"; Transliteration: "Meruru Yūbin de ～ su!/Fuyuki Paakingu Eria de Arimasu" (Japanese: メルル 郵便で～す！ であります/冬樹 パーキングエリアで一服 であります)	September 6, 2008
229	"Keroro, Killer Fist of Words!/Saburo and Kululu, Silent Fight"; Transliteration: "Keroro Kotoba no Hissatsu Ken! de Arimasu/Saburō & Kururu Shizuka na Tatakai de Arimasu" (Japanese: ケロロ コトバの必殺拳！ であります/サブロー&クルル 静かな戦い であります)	September 13, 2008
230	"Momoka, Big Operation: Love Savings/Zeroro, I Finally Found Kikaka"; Transliteration: "Momoka Ai no Setsuyaku Sakusen de Arimasu/Zeroro Kikaka ga Yattekita de Arimasu" (Japanese: 桃華 愛の節約作戦 であります/ゼロロ キカカがやってきた であります)	September 20, 2008
231	"Musha Kero: Volume 3, Big Explosion, Close Call For Princess Momo"; Transliteration: "Musha Kero San no Maki Daibakuhatsu! Momohime Kikiippatsu de Gozasōrō" (Japanese: 武者ケロ 参の巻 大爆発！桃姫危機一髪 でござ候)	September 27, 2008
232	"Keroro, Board Robbing/Keroro, He～ro～es"; Transliteration: "Keroro Bōdorobō de Arimasu/Keroro Hīrōzu de Arimasu" (Japanese: ケロロ ボードロボー であります/ケロロ ひ～ろ～ず であります)	October 4, 2008
233	"Aki, Editors are Strong!"; Transliteration: "Aki Henshūsha wa Tsuyoshi! de Arimasu" (Japanese: 秋 編集者は強し！ であります)	October 11, 2008
234	"Keroro, Operation TV Projector/Keroro, Invading with a How-To Book"; Transliteration: "Keroro Teroppu Daisakusen de Arimasu/Keroro Hautsū Hon de Shinryaku de Arimasu" (Japanese: ケロロ テロップ大作戦 であります/ケロロ ハウツー本で侵略 であります)	October 18, 2008
235	"Fuyuki and the Plesiosaur"; Transliteration: "Fuyuki to Shuchōryū de Arimasu" (Japanese: 冬樹 と 首長竜 であります)	October 25, 2008
236	"Keroro, Chewing Gum?/Tamama, Tamamatango"; Transliteration: "Keroro Gamu Kamu? de Arimasu/Tamama Tamama Tango de Arimasu" (Japanese: ケロロ ガム噛む？ であります/タママ タママタンゴ であります)	November 1, 2008
237	"Musha Kero, Volume 4: Go West, Musha Kero Platoon"; Transliteration: "Musha Kero Yon no Maki Musha Kero Shōtai Nishi e! de Gozasōrō" (Japanese: 武者ケロ 四の巻 武者ケロ小隊 西へ！ でござ候)	November 8, 2008
238	"Keroro, Attack! Hint Age Difference Ultra Hammer/Dororo, Big Change!"; Transliteration: "Keroro Atakku! Hinto de Tashi no Sa Urutora Hanmā de Arimasu/Dororo Daikaizō! de Arimasu" (Japanese: ケロロ アタック！ヒントで 年の差ウルトラハンマー であります/ドロロ 大改造！ であります)	November 15, 2008
239	"Natsumi, Is it A Love Triangle?/Pururu, Big Marriage Meeting Plan!"; Transliteration: "Natsumi Moshikashite Sankaku Kankei? de Arimasu/Pururu Omiai Daisakusen! de Arimasu" (Japanese: 夏美 もしかして三角関係？ であります/プルル お見合い大作戦！ であります)	November 22, 2008
240	"Kululu, Sergeant Major's Special Mission/Keroro, Morning of Legends"; Transliteration: "Kururu Tokumei Sōchō de Arimasu/Keroro Densetsu no Asa de Arimasu" (Japanese: クルル 特命曹長 であります/ケロロ 伝説の朝 であります)	November 29, 2008
241	"Kogoro, I Can't Tell You Right Now/Keroro, Vacuum Cleaner Forever!"; Transliteration: "Kogorō Ima wa Ienai de Arimasu/Keroro Sōjiki yo Eien nare! de Arimasu" (Japanese: 556 今は言えない であります/ケロロ 掃除機よ永遠なれ！ であります)	December 6, 2008
242	"Keroro, Ceiling Walker/Keroro, Self-Consciousness Invasion"; Transliteration: "keroro Yaneura no Sanposha de Arimasu/Keroro Jiishikikajō de Shinryaku! de Arimasu" (Japanese: ケロロ 屋根裏の散歩者 であります/ケロロ 自意識過剰で侵略！ であります)	December 13, 2008
243	"Keroro, Merry Christmas on the Battlefield"; Transliteration: "Keroro Senjō wa Merī Kurisumasu de Arimasu" (Japanese: ケロロ 戦場はメリークリスマス であります)	December 20, 2008
244	"Keroro, Graffiti Dweller/Keroro, New Year's Eve Bustle"; Transliteration: "Keroro Rakugaki no Jūnin de Arimasu/Keroro Toshikoshi Daisōdō de Arimasu" (Japanese: ケロロ 落書きの住人 であります/ケロロ 年越し大騒動 であります)	December 27, 2008
245	"Keroro, New Year's Invasion Operation!/Kogoro, Scratched Helmet"; Transliteration: "Keroro Hatsu Shinryaku Sakusen! de Arimasu/Kogorō Kizutsuita Herumetto de Arimasu" (Japanese: ケロロ 初侵略作戦！ であります/556 傷ついたヘルメット であります)	January 3, 2009
246	"Giroro, Special Gargling Training!/Keroro, Kero-Eraser!"; Transliteration: "Giroro Ugai Mōtokkun!/Keroro Kero Keshi! de Arimasu" (Japanese: ギロロ うがい猛特訓！ であります/ケロロ ケロ消し！ であります)	January 10, 2009
247	"Mois, Lipstick Slapstick/Keroro, Get Out! Keron Bar Field"; Transliteration: "Moa Rippusutikku Surappusutikku de Arimasu/Keroro Dasshutsu! Keron Bā Fīrudo de Arimasu" (Japanese: モア リップスティック・スラップスティック であります/ケロロ 脱出！ ケロンバーフィールド であります)	January 17, 2009
248	"Keroro, Don't Call Me Mommy/Masayoshi Yoshiokadaira: That Delusion is Mine!"; Transliteration: "Keroro Mama to Yobanai de de Arimasu/Yoshiokadaira Masayoshi Mōsō suru wa Waga ni Ari! de Arimasu" (Japanese: ケロロ ママと呼ばないで であります/吉岡平正義 妄想するは我にあり！ であります)	January 24, 2009
249	"Musha Kero, Volume 5: Keronian of the Hidden Fortress"; Transliteration: "Musha Kero Go no Maki Kakushi Toride no Keronjin de Gozasōrō" (Japanese: 武者ケロ・伍の巻 隠し砦のケロン人 でござ候)	February 7, 2009
250	"Musha Kero, Volume 6: The Revived Hero!!"; Transliteration: "Musha Kero Roku no Maki Yomigaeru Yūsha de Gozasōrō!!" (Japanese: 武者ケロ•六の巻 蘇る勇者 でござ候)	February 14, 2009
251	"Kogoro and Kobayashi!"; Transliteration: "Kogorō to Kobayashi! de Arimasu" (Japanese: 556と5884！ であります)	February 21, 2009
252	"Keroro, Let's Go to the Movies!"; Transliteration: "Keroro Eiga ni Yukou! de Arimasu" (Japanese: ケロロ 映画に行こう！ であります)	February 28, 2009
253	"Keroro, The Incredible Keroro/Keroro, Black-Phone Investigator 66"; Transliteration: "Keroro Chōjin Keroro de Arimasu/Keroro Kuro Denwa Sōsakan Rokujūroku de Arimasu" (Japanese: ケロロ 超人ケロロ であります/ケロロ 黒電話捜査官66 であります)	March 7, 2009
254	"Fuyuki, Trunks versus Briefs/Garuru, Obscured Feelings!?"; Transliteration: "Fuyuki Torankusu tai Burīfu de Arimasu/Garuru Hisokanaru Omoi!? de Arimasu" (Japanese: 冬樹 トランクス対ブリーフ であります/ガルル 密かなる想い！？ であります)	March 14, 2009
255	"Keroro, Frightening Darkness Plan!/Keroro, Frightening Whiteness Plan/Keroro, Frightening Time-Stop Plan!"; Transliteration: "Keroro Kyōfu no Dai Ankoku Sakusen! de Arimasu/Keroro Kyōfu no Dai Bihaku Sakusen! de Arimasu/Keroro Kyōfu no Dai Teishi Sakusen! de Arimasu" (Japanese: ケロロ 恐怖の大暗黒作戦！ であります/ケロロ 恐怖の大美白作戦！ であります/ケロロ 恐怖の大停止作戦！ であります)	March 21, 2009
256	"Fuyuki and Natsumi, Keroro Invasion!/Keroro, That's a～Lie♪"; Transliteration: "Fuyuki & Natsumi Keroro Shūrai! de Arimasu/Keroro Usso da Yōn♪ de Arimasu" (Japanese: 冬樹＆夏美 ケロロ襲来！ であります/ケロロ ウッソだよ～ん♪ であります)	March 28, 2009

=== Season 6 (2009–10) ===
No.	Title	Original release date
257	"Keroro, First Encounter Revisited!"; Transliteration: "keroro Daiichi Wa Kaitei! de Arimasu" (Japanese: ケロロ 第一話改訂！ であります)	April 4, 2009
258	"Keroro, Negative Thinking of Terror/Keroro, Grilled Meat Without Dignity"; Transliteration: "Keroro Kyōfu no Negativu Shinkingu de Arimasu/Keroro Jingi naki Yakiniku de Arimasu" (Japanese: ケロロ 恐怖のネガティヴシンキング であります/ケロロ 仁義なき焼肉 であります)	April 11, 2009
259	"Koyuki, Cherry Blossom Trouble!"; Transliteration: "Koyuki Sakura Taihen! de Arimasu" (Japanese: 小雪 サクラ大変！ であります)	April 18, 2009
260	"Kero Zero, Keroro Platoon's Departure Last Night/Kero Zero, Keroro Platoon's First Mission"; Transliteration: "Kero Zero Keroro Shōtai Shuppatsu Zen'ya de Arimasu/Kero Zero Keroro Shōtai Fāsuto Misshon de Arimasu" (Japanese: ケロゼロ ケロロ小隊出発前夜 であります/ケロゼロ ケロロ小隊ファーストミッション であります)	April 25, 2009
261	"Momoka, The Big Seat Change Plan/Kogoro, My Feelings!"; Transliteration: "Momoka Seki Kae Daisakusen de Arimasu/Kogorō Ore no Omoi! de Arimasu" (Japanese: 桃華 席替え大作戦 であります/556 オレの想い！ であります)	May 2, 2009
262	"Bariri, Loving Chief Medic/Keroro, Mother Looking Up In the Sky"; Transliteration: "Bariri Itoshi no Kangochō de Arimasu/Keroro Sora o Miagerya Ofukuro-san de Arimasu" (Japanese: バリリ 愛しの看護長 であります/ケロロ 空を見上げりゃお袋さん であります)	May 9, 2009
263	"Keroro, Weevil That Grants Dreams/Keroro, Do Your Best, Trash Bag!"; Transliteration: "Keroro Yume o Kanaeru Zōmushi de Arimasu/Keroro Ganbare Gomibukuro! de Arimasu" (Japanese: ケロロ 夢をかなえるゾウムシ であります/ケロロ がんばれゴミ袋！ であります)	May 16, 2009
264	"Keroro, the Space Digital Monster Attacks!/Keroro, Transform"; Transliteration: "Keroro Uchū Dejitaru Kaijū Shūrai! de Arimasu/Keroro Henshin de Arimasu" (Japanese: ケロロ 宇宙デジタル怪獣襲来！ であります/ケロロ 変身 であります)	May 23, 2009
265	"Giroro, Remote-Controlled Date/Keroro, Pu's Doubts"; Transliteration: "Giroro Rimokon de Dēto de Arimasu/Keroro Pū ga Ita Dōkutsu de Arimasu" (Japanese: ギロロ リモコンでデート であります/ケロロ プーがいた洞窟 であります)	May 30, 2009
266	"Tamama, That Wake-Up Kiss is Mine/Pururu, Revealed Secret?!"; Transliteration: "Tamama Mezame no Kissu wa Boku no Mono de Arimasu/Pururu Barechatta Himitsu?! de Arimasu" (Japanese: タママ 目覚めのキッスは僕のもの であります/プルル ばれちゃった秘密?! であります)	June 6, 2009
267	"Keroro, Big Air Anything Operation/Keroro, Motel"; Transliteration: "Keroro Ea Nantoka Daisakusen! de Arimasu/Keroro Moteru de Arimasu" (Japanese: ケロロ エアなんとか大作戦！ であります/ケロロ モテる であります)	June 13, 2009
268	"Kero Zero, Enter Pekoponian Mecha Designer Kiko Katoyama"; Transliteration: "Kero Zero Pekoponjin Meka Dezainā Katoyama Kiko Tōjō de Arimasu" (Japanese: ケロゼロ ペコポン人 メカデザイナー カトヤマ・キコ 登場 であります)	June 20, 2009
269	"Momoka, Big Head Over Heels Operation/Giroro, Escape From Natsumi!"; Transliteration: "Momoka Horeta Hareta no Daisōdō de Arimasu/Giroro Natsumi kara no Dasshutsu! de Arimasu" (Japanese: 桃華 ホレたハレたの大騒動 であります/ギロロ 夏美からの脱出！ であります)	June 27, 2009
270	"Chibi Kero vs. Chibi Fuyuki"; Transliteration: "Chibi Kero tai Chibi Fuyuki de Arimasu" (Japanese: ちびケロVSちび冬樹 であります)	July 4, 2009
271	"Tamama, It's Hard Being an Upperclassman/Natsumi, We're All Boys!"; Transliteration: "Tamama Senpai wa Tsurai yo de Arimasu/Natsumi Bokutachi Otokonoko! de Arimasu" (Japanese: タママ 先輩はつらいよ であります/夏美 僕たち男の子！ であります)	July 11, 2009
272	"Wettle King versus Kogoro/Three Weirdos, Smallest Showdown on Pekopon"; Transliteration: "Wettoru Kingu tai Kogorō! de Arimasu/San Daikaijin Pekopon Saishō no Kessen de Arimasu" (Japanese: ウェットルキング 対 556！ であります/三大怪人 ペコポン最小の決戦 であります)	July 18, 2009
273	"Keroro, Training is OK/Koyuki, Confrontation! Midsummer's Shore"; Transliteration: "Keroro Shikomi wa OK de Arimasu/Koyuki Taiketsu! Manatsu no Kaigan de Arimasu" (Japanese: ケロロ 仕込みはＯＫ であります/小雪 対決！真夏の海岸 であります)	July 25, 2009
274	"Keroro Platoon, Under Keroro!"; Transliteration: "Keroro Shōtai Chinmoku no Keroro! de Arimasu" (Japanese: ケロロ小隊 沈黙のケロロ！ であります)	August 1, 2009
275	"Keroro, Keron-Style Golf/Keroro, Run Keroro"; Transliteration: "Keroro Keron Shiki Gorufu de Arimasu/Keroro Hashire Keroro de Arimasu" (Japanese: ケロロ ケロン式ゴルフ であります/ケロロ 走れケロロ であります)	August 8, 2009
276	"Keroro, The Admiral Attacks!/Giroro, It's This Zipper"; Transliteration: "Keroro Teitokudono Kyōshū! de Arimasu/Giroro Chakku wa Sonomama de de Arimasu" (Japanese: ケロロ 提督殿強襲！ であります/ギロロ チャックはそのままで であります)	August 15, 2009
277	"Kero Zero, Space Catering/Kero Zero, Formula for Eating"; Transliteration: "Kero Zero Uchū de Demae de Arimasu/Kero Zero Tabetai Hōteishiki de Arimasu" (Japanese: ケロゼロ 宇宙で出前 であります/ケロゼロ 食べたい方程式 であります)	August 22, 2009
278	"Ghost Girl, Before-After/Giroro, the Red Fairy"; Transliteration: "Yūrei-chan Bifō Afutā de Arimasu/Giroro Akai Yōsei de Arimasu" (Japanese: 幽霊ちゃん ビフォーアフター であります/ギロロ 赤い妖精 であります)	August 29, 2009
279	"Alisa's First Time with Mama!?"; Transliteration: "Arisa Hajimete no Mama!? de Arimasu" (Japanese: アリサ 初めてのママ!? であります)	September 5, 2009
280	"Keroro & Natsumi, Ruthless Stamp Card/Keroro, Sad Kerobot"; Transliteration: "Keroro & Natsumi Hitoyoshi naki Sutanpu Kādo de Arimasu/Keroro Kanashimi no Kerobotto de Arimasu" (Japanese: ケロロ＆夏美 仁義無きスタンプカード であります/ケロロ 悲しみのケロボット であります)	September 12, 2009
281	"Keroro, Cicada Platoon/Keroro, Ribbit Day"; Transliteration: "Keroro Semi Shōtai de Arimasu/Keroro Kērō no Hi de Arimasu" (Japanese: ケロロ セミ小隊 であります/ケロロ ケーローの日 であります)	September 19, 2009
282	"Momoka, Sudden Dance of Flames/Kero Zero, All Quiet on the Fig Front"; Transliteration: "Momoka Totsuzen Honō no Gotoku de Arimasu/Kero Zero Ichijiku Sensen Ijō nashi de Arimasu" (Japanese: 桃華 突然炎のごとく であります/ケロゼロ イチジク戦線異常なし であります)	September 26, 2009
283	"Keroro, 5 Shocked Keronians/Fuyuki, Planet of the Humans"; Transliteration: "Keroro Gonin no Akireru Keronjin de Arimasu/Fuyuki Ningen no Wakusei de Arimasu" (Japanese: ケロロ 5人の呆れるケロン人 であります/冬樹 人間の惑星 であります)	October 3, 2009
284	"Dororo, Farewell Platoon"; Transliteration: "Dororo Saraba Shōtai de Arimasu" (Japanese: ドロロ さらば小隊 であります)	October 10, 2009
285	"Aki, Earth's Front Line of Defense/Natsumi, Tension! Parent's Classroom Visit"; Transliteration: "Aki Chikyūbōei Saizensen! de Arimasu/Natsumi Kinpaku! Jugyō Sankan de Arimasu" (Japanese: 秋 地球防衛最前線！ であります/夏美 緊迫！授業参観 であります)	October 17, 2009
286	"Keroro, Careless Saturated Operation!/Keroro, Invasion! Softglon of Terror"; Transliteration: "Keroro Ukkari Bichobicho Daisakusen! de Arimasu/Keroro Shinryaku! Kyōfu no Sofutoguron de Arimasu" (Japanese: ケロロ うっかりビチョビチョ大作戦！ であります/ケロロ 侵略！恐怖のソフトグロン であります)	October 24, 2009
287	"Natsumi, Stop Those Hiccups～/Kero Zero, The one waiting on the Training Planet"; Transliteration: "Natsumi Shakkuri Tometē de Arimasu/Kero Zero Kunren Wakusei no Machibito de Arimasu" (Japanese: 夏美 しゃっくり止めて～ であります/ケロゼロ 訓練惑星の待ち人 であります)	October 31, 2009
288	"Keroro, Kappa Legend/Keroro, Welcome Back"; Transliteration: "Keroro Kappa Densetsu de Arimasu/Keroro Okaerinasai de Arimasu" (Japanese: ケロロ カッパ伝説 であります/ケロロ おかえりなさい であります)	November 7, 2009
289	"Giroro, Red Devil of the Battlefield/Keroro, Is That Really a Lie?"; Transliteration: "Giroro Senjō no Akai Akuma de Arimasu/Keroro Sono Uso, Honto? de Arimasu" (Japanese: ギロロ 戦場の赤い悪魔 であります/ケロロ そのウソ、ホント？ であります)	November 14, 2009
290	"Poyon, Miracle Paul Operation!/Kero Zero, Snow is a Merciless Queen of the Night"; Transliteration: "Poyon Pōru ni Mirakuru Daisakusen! de Arimasu/Kero Zero Yuki wa Mujihi na Yoru no Joō de Arimasu" (Japanese: ポヨン ポールにミラクル大作戦！ であります/ケロゼロ 雪は無慈悲な夜の女王 であります)	November 21, 2009
291	"Alisa & Nevula, First Hot Spring/Keroro Platoon, Struggle! Torinoichi"; Transliteration: "Arisa & Nebura Hajimete no Onsen de Arimasu/Keroro Shōtai Funtō! Torinoichi de Arimasu" (Japanese: アリサ＆ネブラ 初めての温泉 であります/ケロロ小隊 奮闘！酉の市 であります)	November 28, 2009
292	"Natsumi, Secret of the Dresser/Keroro, You Were in my Dream"; Transliteration: "Natsumi Tansu no Himitsu de Arimasu/Keroro Yume no Naka ni Kimi ga Ite de Arimasu" (Japanese: 夏美 タンスの秘密 であります/ケロロ 夢の中に君がいて であります)	December 5, 2009
293	"Again Gero Gero 30 Minutes"; Transliteration: "Matamata Gerogero Sanjū Bun de Arimasu" (Japanese: またまたゲロゲロ30分 であります)	December 12, 2009
294	"Yoshiokadaira, Bodyguard Elegy/Natsumi, Christmas Party Operation"; Transliteration: "Yoshiokadaira Shineitai Erejī de Arimasu/Natsumi Kurisumasu Kai Daisakusen de Arimasu" (Japanese: 吉岡平 親衛隊哀歌（エレジー） であります/夏美 クリスマス会大作戦 であります)	December 19, 2009
295	"Keroro, The Two of Us Are One Kerororm/Keroro, Mysterious Ultimate Weapon"; Transliteration: "Keroro Futari ga Hitori Kerorōmu! de Arimasu/Keroro Nazo no Saishū Heiki de Arimasu" (Japanese: ケロロ 二人が一人ケロロ～ム！ であります/ケロロ 謎の最終兵器 であります)	December 26, 2009
296	"Keroro, New Year's Lucky Haste/Keroro, This Year Is Keron Year!"; Transliteration: "Keroro Shinnen Sōsō Rakkī de Arimasu/Keroro Kotoshi wa Kerontoshi! de Arimasu" (Japanese: ケロロ 新年早々 ラッキー であります/ケロロ 今年はケロン年！ であります)	January 2, 2010
297	"Keroro, Just One Chance/Dangale Lands"; Transliteration: "Keroro Chansu wa Ichido de Arimasu/Dangaru Daichi ni Tatsu de Arimasu" (Japanese: ケロロ チャンスは一度 であります/ダンガル 大地を立つ であります)	January 9, 2010
298	"Mois, Goodbye Pekopon/Saburo, The Mysterious Boy"; Transliteration: "Moa Sayonara Pekopon de Arimasu/Saburo Nazo Ōki Shōnen de Arimasu" (Japanese: モア さよなら ペコポン であります/サブロ 謎多き少年 であります)	January 16, 2010
299	"Giroro, Take Down G-Force!/Giroro, G-Force's Counterattack"; Transliteration: "Giroro Jī o Taose! de Arimasu/Giroro Jī no Gyakushū de Arimasu" (Japanese: ギロロ Ｇを倒せ！ であります/ギロロ Ｇの逆襲 であります)	January 23, 2010
300	"Onono, Illusionary Keron Soldier"; Transliteration: "Onono: Maboroshi no Keron hei de Arimasu" (Japanese: オノノ 幻のケロン兵 であります)	February 6, 2010
301	"Tamama, Kicked Out Of The Nishizawa Family?/Momoka, Chocolate Cake of Love and Sadness"; Transliteration: "Tamama: Nishizawa ke Tsuihō? de Arimasu/Momoka: Ai to Kanashimi no Choko Keeki de Arimasu" (Japanese: タママ 西澤家追放？ であります/桃花 愛と悲しみのチョコケーキ)	February 13, 2010
302	"Keroro, I'm A Director!/Keroro & Fuyuki, Small Adventure In a Big City"; Transliteration: "Keroro: Wagahai wa Kantoku dzayo! de Arimasu/Keroro & Fuyuki Dai tokai no Chiisa na Bōken de Arimasu" (Japanese: ケロロ 我輩は監督ぢゃよ！ であります/ケロロ＆冬樹 大都会の小さな冒険 であります)	February 20, 2010
303	"Kero Zero, My Home is Pekopon"; Transliteration: "Kero Zero: Kokyō wa Pekopon de Arimasu" (Japanese: ケロゼロ 故郷はペコポン)	February 27, 2010
304	"Keroro, Please Give Me That Back!"; Transliteration: "Keroro: Soredake wa Kaeshi te Chōtai de Arimasu" (Japanese: ケロロ それだけは返してちょ～だい！ であります)	March 6, 2010
305	"Nobibi Came!"; Transliteration: "Nobibi ga kita! de Arimasu" (Japanese: ノビビ が来た！ であります)	March 13, 2010
306	"Shugo Kero, Dokki Doki Party!/Dororo, Doro is Coming!"; Transliteration: "Shugo Kero, Dokki Doki Pāti! de Arimasu / Dororo: Doro rō ga kuru! de Arimasu" (Japanese: しゅごケロ どっき どき パーティ！ であります/ドロロ ドロ郎が来る！ であります)	March 20, 2010
307	"Keroro & Fuyuki, Night of the Time Capsule"; Transliteration: "Keroro & Fuyuki: Taimu Kapuseru no Yoru de Arimasu" (Japanese: ケロロ＆冬樹 タイムカプセルの夜 であります)	March 27, 2010

=== Season 7 (2010–11) ===
No.	Title	Original release date
308–A	"Keroro, nightmare in the third planet!" (Japanese: ケロロ 第三惑星の悪夢 であります)	April 3, 2010
308–B	"Nocturnal Sergeant Keroro" (Japanese: 夜のケロロ軍曹 であります)	April 4, 2010
309–A	"Giroro, Pekopon invasion starts!" (Japanese: ギロロ ペコポン侵略開始! であります)	April 10, 2010
309–B	"Giroro & Natsumi, operation cell phone mail" (Japanese: ギロロ&夏美 携帯メール作戦 であります)	April 11, 2010
310–A	"Tamama, Kingdom of Sweets" (Japanese: タママ お菓子の王国 であります)	April 17, 2010
310–B	"Momoka, I appreciate your kindness" (Japanese: 桃華 お世話になります であります)	April 18, 2010
311–A	"Kululu, the invasion has started" (Japanese: クルル 侵略ははじまっている であります)	April 24, 2010
311–B	"Keroro, a good kero story!" (Japanese: ケロロ ケロいい話! であります)	April 25, 2010
312–A	"Dororo, invasion is my mission!" (Japanese: ドロロ 侵略こそ我が使命! であります)	May 1, 2010
312–B	"Koyuki's Se-cre-t." (Japanese: 小雪 のヒ・ミ・ツ…。 であります)	May 2, 2010
313–A	"Keroro, invasion achievement in the next day" (Japanese: ケロロ 侵略達成翌日 であります)	May 8, 2010
313–B	"Aki, becoming an invader" (Japanese: 秋 侵略者になる であります)	May 9, 2010
314–A	"Keroro, naked invasion" (Japanese: ケロロ 裸の侵略者 であります)	May 15, 2010
314–B	"Natsumi & Saburo, launch break of the skies" (Japanese: 夏美&サブロー 昼休みの空 であります)	May 16, 2010
315–A	"Keroro, enjoyable horticulture" (Japanese: ケロロ 楽しい園芸 であります)	May 22, 2010
315–B	"Fuyuki, Shadow stepping of the other days" (Japanese: 冬樹 いつかの影ふみ であります)	May 23, 2010
316–A	"Momoka, I'm the sergeant?" (Japanese: 桃華 私は軍曹? であります)	May 29, 2010
316–B	"Keroro, invasion operation from space" (Japanese: ケロロ 宇宙からの侵略者作戦 であります)	May 30, 2010
317–A	"Keroro, Viper search!" (Japanese: ケロロ ヴァイパーを捜せ! であります)	June 5, 2010
317–B	"Giroro, soldier in the closet" (Japanese: ギロロ 天袋の中の戦士 であります)	June 6, 2010
318–A	"Dororo, the man of the mask" (Japanese: ドロロ 仮面の男 であります)	June 12, 2010
318–B	"Mois, black visitor" (Japanese: モア 黒い来訪者 であります)	June 13, 2010
319–A	"Mois, genius hacker?" (Japanese: モア 天才ハッカー? であります)	June 19, 2010
319–B	"Kululu, small old clock" (Japanese: クルル 小さな古時計 であります)	June 20, 2010
320–A	"Natsumi, charming invaders" (Japanese: 夏美憧れの侵略者 であります)	June 26, 2010
320–B	"Pururu, June's bride?" (Japanese: プルル 六月の花嫁?であります)	June 27, 2010
321–A	"Keroro, learning with the old" (Japanese: ケロロ 古きに学べであります)	July 3, 2010
321–B	"Natsumi, gentleness is a sin..." (Japanese: 夏美 優しさは罪…であります)	July 4, 2010
322–A	"Giroro, impossible escape?!" (Japanese: ギロロ 脱出不可能! であります)	July 10, 2010
322–B	"Keroro, impossible rescue?!" (Japanese: ケロロ 救出不可能? であります)	July 11, 2010
323–A	"Keroro, advent of the space chief of house-sitting" (Japanese: ケロロ 宇宙御留守番長降臨 であります)	July 17, 2010
323–B	"Natsumi, Cameraman training battlefield!" (Japanese: 夏美 戦場カメラマン大訓練! であります)	July 18, 2010
324–A	"Natsumi, presses it!" (Japanese: 夏美 押すな! であります)	July 24, 2010
324–B	"Keroro, invader level check" (Japanese: ケロロ 侵略者度チェック であります)	July 25, 2010
325–A	"Keroro, Version Up Model" (Japanese: ケロロ バージョンアップモデル であります)	July 31, 2010
325–B	"Keroro, the make up used is the self" (Japanese: ケロロ お化粧するは我にあり であります)	August 1, 2010
326–A	"Chibi Kero, fireworks from that summer" (Japanese: ちびケロ あの夏の花火であります)	August 7, 2010
326–B	"Keroro, Swimsuit Beauties Contest!" (Japanese: ケロロ 水着美女コンテスト! であります)	August 8, 2010
327–A	"Keroro, super hero!" (Japanese: ケロロ 正義の味方! であります)	August 14, 2010
327–B	"Keroro, invasion in a blink!" (Japanese: ケロロ あっというまの侵略! であります)	August 15, 2010
328–A	"Momoka, becoming normal!" (Japanese: 桃華普通にしやがれ! であります)	August 21, 2010
328–B	"Paul's day off" (Japanese: ポールの休日 であります)	August 22, 2010
329–A	"Fuyuki worried!" (Japanese: 冬樹気になる! であります)	August 28, 2010
329–B	"Natsumi, the ocean isn't large or big" (Japanese: 夏美海は広いな大きいな であります)	August 29, 2010
330–A	"556, unluckiest partner" (Japanese: 556 史上最凶の相棒であります)	September 4, 2010
330–B	"Koyuki, first curry" (Japanese: 小雪 初めてのカレーであります)	September 5, 2010
331–A	"Natsumi, one week without anger" (Japanese: 夏美怒ってはいけない一週間であります)	September 11, 2010
331–B	"Keroro, invasion is a second stomach?" (Japanese: ケロロ侵略はベツバラ?であります)	September 12, 2010
332–A	"Fuyuki, butterfly person appears?" (Japanese: 冬樹蝶人出現?であります)	September 18, 2010
332–B	"Giroro, uninvited guest" (Japanese: ギロロ招かざる客であります)	September 19, 2010
333–A	"Momoka, mood of the starry sky" (Japanese: 桃華星空の気持ちであります)	September 25, 2010
333–B	"Keroro, little hair of luck" (Japanese: ケロロ福毛ちゃんであります)	September 26, 2010
334–A	"Keroro, clash, star circular violence tool tournament" (Japanese: ケロロ 激突☆暴輪具大会であります)	October 2, 2010
334–B	"Keroro, My Super Decisive Plan!?" (Japanese: ケロロ 我輩、超決断計画!?であります)	October 3, 2010
335–A	"Keroro, leader representative robot launches!" (Japanese: ケロロ 隊長代理ロボ出動!であります)	October 9, 2010
335–B	"Keroro, the moon is luxurious!" (Japanese: ケロロ 月は豪華だ! であります)	October 10, 2010
336–A	"Dororo, ninja approaching the shadow" (Japanese: ドロロ 忍び寄る影 であります)	October 16, 2010
336–B	"Natsumi, exploration of the construction of the Hinata residence" (Japanese: 夏美 日向家建物探訪 であります)	October 17, 2010
337–A	"Keroro, Flowers for Algernainon" (Japanese: ケロロ アルジャナイノンに花束を であります)	October 23, 2010
337–B	"Giroro, oh! Ferocious Ox" (Japanese: ギロロ Oh!モウギュウ であります)	October 24, 2010
338–A	"Koyuki, day of Halloween" (Japanese: 小雪 ハロウィンの日 であります)	October 30, 2010
338–B	"Koyuki vs Alisa, duel of the ocean depths" (Japanese: 小雪VSアリサ 深海の決闘 であります)	October 31, 2010
339–A	"Keroro, red light of fear" (Japanese: ケロロ 恐怖の赤信号 であります)	November 6, 2010
339–B	"Keroro, Invasion Plus Minus" (Japanese: ケロロ 侵略プラスマイナスであります)	November 7, 2010
340–A	"Aki, real ramen" (Japanese: 秋本当のラーメン であります)	November 13, 2010
340–B	"Joriri, false ramen" (Japanese: ジョリリ 偽りのラーメン であります)	November 14, 2010
341–A	"Keroro, restroom survival!" (Japanese: ケロロ トイレでサバイバル! であります)	November 20, 2010
341–B	"Keroro vs Giroro vs Tamama vs Dororo" (Japanese: ケロロ 対ギロロ対タママ対ドロロ であります)	November 21, 2010
342–A	"Keroro, Birth! New Final Technique!" (Japanese: ケロロ 誕生!新必殺技! であります)	November 27, 2010
342–B	"Natsumi going through" (Japanese: 夏美 ツツヌケ であります)	November 28, 2010
343–A	"556, the Space Sheriff!" (Japanese: 556 宇宙刑事だっ!)	December 4, 2010
343–B	"Lavie, leave it to me" (Japanese: ラビー におまかせであります)	December 5, 2010
344–A	"Pururu, Pekopon love tour" (Japanese: プルル めぐり愛ペコポンであります)	December 11, 2010
344–B	"Alisa & Momoka, women's battle" (Japanese: アリサ&桃華 女の戦いであります)	December 12, 2010
345–A	"Keroro vs Giroro, duel in the cold rain!" (Japanese: ケロロVSギロロ 氷雨の中の決闘!であります)	December 18, 2010
345–B	"Keroro platoon, big year-end party" (Japanese: ケロロ小隊 大忘年会であります)	December 19, 2010
346–A	"Keroro, rejected Operation Bouquet" (Japanese: ケロロ ボツ作戦に花束をであります)	December 25, 2010
346–B	"Keroro, dear Natsumi" (Japanese: ケロロ 拝啓夏美殿であります)	December 26, 2010
347–A	"Keroro, invader's aura" (Japanese: ケロロ 侵略者のオーラ であります)	December 31, 2010
347–B	"Dororon? Tamama-kun" (Japanese: ドロロ ン? タママくん であります)	January 1, 2011
348–A	"Fuyuki, Birth! Jerseyman Fuyuki" (Japanese: 冬樹誕生・ジャージマン冬樹 であります)	January 2, 2011
348–B	"Keroro, the great throat candies" (Japanese: ケロロ素敵ナの雨 であります)	January 8, 2011
349–A	"Keroro, invading daily life" (Japanese: ケロロ 日常を侵略せよ であります)	January 15, 2011
349–B	"Keroro, hooray for reset" (Japanese: ケロロ リセット万歳 であります)	January 22, 2011
350–A	"Mois, chronicle of uncle's hard battles" (Japanese: モア オジサマ奮闘記 であります)	January 29, 2011
350–B	"Aki VS Cat, mixed martial arts match" (Japanese: 秋×ネコ 異種格闘技戦！ であります)	February 5, 2011
351–A	"This time is Gero Gero 15 minutes" (Japanese: こんどはゲロゲロ15分 であります)	February 12, 2011
351–B	"Giroro, show me!" (Japanese: ギロロ 見せてくれ！! であります)	February 13, 2011
352–A	"Nabebe, Yaminabe magistrate!" (Japanese: ナベベ 闇鍋奉行！! であります)	February 19, 2011
352–B	"Natsumi, 623's identity" (Japanese: 夏美 623の正体 であります)	February 20, 2011
353–A	"Spirit-chan, I'll rest in peace" (Japanese: 幽霊ちゃん 私成仏します であります)	February 26, 2011
353–B	"Giroro, even after dreaming time" (Japanese: ギロロ 夢見る頃を過ぎても であります)	February 27, 2011
354–A	"Keroro, visitor from the future" (Japanese: ケロロ 未来からの訪問者であります)	March 5, 2011
354–B	"623, tragedy of the radio star" (Japanese: 623 ラジオスターの悲劇であります)	March 6, 2011
355–A	"Ouka resigns!" (Japanese: 桜華 引退! であります)	March 13, 2011 (Note: March 19, 2011 for 15 minutes version)
355–B	"Keroro must survive" (Japanese: ケロロ 君は生き残ることが出来るか であります)	March 13, 2011
356–A	"Keroro platoon, real Dragon Warriors" (Japanese: ケロロ小隊 真ドラゴンウォリアーズ であります)	March 26, 2011
356–B	"Mois, that one other person's spring" (Japanese: モア もうひとりへの春 であります)	March 27, 2011
357	"Hinata family, Haru returns" (Japanese: 日向家 春、帰還 であります)	April 2, 2011
358–A	"Keroro, The world's Sgt. Keroros" (Japanese: ケロロ 世界のケロロ軍曹 であります)	April 3, 2011
358–B	"Keroro, Keron Army Style excursion great opening!" (Japanese: ケロロ ケロン軍式遠足大公開! であります)	April 3, 2011
