= Shepherd Mead =

American writer

- Born: Edward Mead; April 26, 1914; St. Louis, Missouri, United States
- Died: August 15, 1994 (aged 80)
- Education: Washington University in St. Louis
- Occupations: Writer, author
- Writing career
- Language: English
- Genres: Non-fiction, fiction

Shepherd Mead (April 26, 1914 – August 15, 1994), born Edward Mead, was an American writer and is best known as the author of How to Succeed in Business Without Really Trying, which was adapted into a hit Broadway show and motion picture.

== Biography ==
Mead, a native of St. Louis, Missouri, graduated with an A.B. from Washington University in St. Louis in 1936. He joined the Benton & Bowles advertising agency in 1936 as a mail-room clerk, and worked his way up to a vice-presidency by the time he left in 1956 to pursue a writing career.

In 1957 Mead moved to Switzerland and in the following year to Great Britain, where he worked as an advertising consultant. He went on to write 19 novels, including The Big Ball of Wax: A Story of Tomorrow's Happy World (1954) describing life in the future year 1993, and The Carefully Considered Rape of the World: A Novel about the Unspeakable (1965), in which all of Earth's fertile women are simultaneously impregnated by baboon-like extraterrestrials. In 1968 he moved back to Switzerland, but then returned to Great Britain in 1978. He died in London in August 1994.

== How to Succeed... ==
Mead's best known book has no plot; it is a satire of an instructional manual, very similar in form and subject matter to Stephen Potter's Gamesmanship. Mead's book was inspired by his corporate experiences; How to Succeed satirized contemporary office life in the United States in the guise of a self-help book. Published in 1952, it was written in his spare time - before work and on weekends. Its subtitle was "The dastard's guide to fame and fortune."

The book was a best-seller, and in 1961 it was adapted into a musical by Frank Loesser, with book by Abe Burrows. the play differs significantly from the book. It satirizes Mead's own career by depicting the rise of eager young J. Pierrepont Finch ... a window-washer who joins a huge corporation by starting in the mail room, and becomes chairman of the board a week later. The play starred Robert Morse as the young striver J. Pierrepont Finch and Rudy Vallee as the company president J.B. Biggley.

The play was a smash hit, with a Broadway run of 1,417 performances between October 1961 and March 1965. It won eight Tony Awards and the 1962 Pulitzer Prize for best drama. During the run of the play, Mead appeared as himself, along with two impostors, on the panel game show To Tell the Truth.

The Broadway production was adapted into a movie, also starring Morse and several other members of the Broadway cast, in 1967. It was successfully revived on Broadway in 1995, starring Matthew Broderick as Finch. A 2011 revival starred Daniel Radcliffe.

In Brazil, the book, titled in Portuguese Como Vencer na Vida sem Fazer Força, was translated by Brazilian dramaturgist Glaucio Gil and published in 1963. The book got two Brazilian prefacies written by Sérgio Porto using the pseudonym "Stanislaw Ponte Preta" and the name of his fictitious cousin "Altamirando".

== Quote ==
"Not even computers will replace committees, because committees buy computers." — Shepherd Mead, quoted in The Wall Street Journal, June 18, 1964.

== Works ==
- Magnificent MacInnes. (1949)
- Tessie, the Hound of Channel One. (1951)
- How to Succeed in Business Without Really Trying; the Dastard’s Guide to Fame and Fortune. (1952) (1st Fireside edition) (1995) ISBN 0-684-80020-9
- Big Ball of Wax; A Story of Tomorrow’s Happy World (Novel, 1954)
- How to Get Rich in TV Without Really Trying. (1956)
- How to Succeed with Women Without Really Trying; the Dastard’s Guide to the Birds and Bees. (1957)
- Admen. (1958)
- Four Window Girl; or, How to Make More Money than Men; a Novel. (1959)
- "Dudley, There is No Tomorrow!" "Then How About this Afternoon?" (Novel, 1963)
- How to Live Like a Lord Without Really Trying. (1964)
- The Carefully Considered Rape of the World : A Novel About the Unspeakable. (1965)
- How to Succeed at Business Spying by Trying; A Novel about Industrial Espionage. (1968)
- ER; or, The Brassbound Beauty, the Bearded Bicyclist, and the Gold-Colored Teen-age Grandfather (Novel, 1969)
- How to Stay Medium-Young Practically Forever Without Really Trying. (1971) ISBN 0-671-20865-9
- Free the Male Man! (1972) ISBN 0-671-21123-4
- How to Get to the Future Before It Gets to You. (1974)
- Tennessee Williams: An Intimate Biography (with Dakin Williams, 1983) ISBN 0-87795-488-7
- How to Succeed in Tennis Without Really Trying: The Easy Tennismanship Way to Do All the Things No Tennis Pro Can Teach You. (1977) ISBN 0-679-50749-3
