= How to Succeed in Business Without Really Trying (book) =

1952 book by Shepherd Mead

- First edition
- Author: Shepherd Mead
- Original title: The dastard's guide to fame and fortune
- Language: English
- Subject: Machiavellian office politics
- Genre: Comedy
- Publisher: Simon & Schuster
- Publication date: 1952
- Publication place: United States
- Media type: Print (hardcover)
- Pages: 148 pp
- OCLC: 541489
- LC Class: HF5386 .M48

How to Succeed in Business Without Really Trying: The Dastard's Guide to Fame and Fortune is a humorous 1952 book by Shepherd Mead. It inspired a successful 1961 musical How to Succeed in Business Without Really Trying, which was made into a movie in 1967.

== Description ==
The book is a satire of an instructional manual, very similar in form and subject matter to Stephen Potter's Gamesmanship. How to Succeed satirizes office life in the United States in the guise of a self-help book. Its subtitle is "The Dastard's Guide to Fame and Fortune".

== Inspiration ==
How to Succeed was inspired by Mead's corporate experiences at the Benton & Bowles advertising agency, which he joined in 1936 as a mail-room clerk, eventually working his way up to a vice-presidency. During his journey up the corporate ladder, Mead wrote the book in his spare time—before work and on weekends. The book was a best-seller.

== Musical adaptation ==
In 1961, the book was adapted into a musical by Dr. Jacob Weinstock and Willie Gilbert. To successfully bring the piece to Broadway, the renowned Abe Burrows was brought in as co writer, and Frank Loesser was brought in to write the music. The musical differs significantly from the book. It satirizes Mead's own career by depicting the rise of eager young J. Pierrepont Finch, a window-washer who joins a huge corporation by starting in the mail room, and becomes chairman of the board two weeks later. The musical starred Robert Morse as the young striver J. Pierrepont Finch, Rudy Vallee as the company president J.B. Biggley, and Charles Nelson Reilly as Biggley's perpetually peeved nephew Bud Frump.

The musical was a smash hit, with a Broadway run of 1,417 performances between October 1961 and March 1965. It won eight Tony Awards and the 1962 Pulitzer Prize for best drama. It was adapted into a movie, also starring Morse and Vallee with Anthony 'Scooter' Teague as Frump, in 1967. It was successfully revived on Broadway in 1995, starring Matthew Broderick as Finch, and again in 2011 with Daniel Radcliffe playing the role. Then in 2012, Darren Criss played the role of Finch for a three-week engagement, and was replaced by Nick Jonas who took the lead until the show closed on May 20, 2012.

== Classification ==
The Library of Congress catalogs the 1995 reprint as non-fiction under "business books", with the subject headings "Success in business", "Management", and "Career development".

== Editions ==
- Mead, Shepherd (1952). How to Succeed in Business Without Really Trying. (1-hour loan). New York: Simon & Schuster.
- London: Cedar Book, 1955 (reprint)
- New York: Simon & Schuster, 1995 (reprint), and 2011 (reprint)
