= How to Succeed in Business Without Really Trying (film) =

1967 film by David Swift

- Theatrical release poster
- Directed by: David Swift
- Screenplay by: David Swift
- Story by: Abe Burrows; Jack Weinstock; Willie Gilbert
- Based on: How to Succeed in Business Without Really Trying by Shepherd Mead
- Produced by: David Swift
- Starring: Robert Morse; Michele Lee; Rudy Vallee; Anthony Teague
- Cinematography: Burnett Guffey
- Edited by: Allan Jacobs; Ralph E. Winters
- Music by: Frank Loesser (songs); Nelson Riddle (incidental music)
- Production company: The Mirisch Corporation
- Distributed by: United Artists
- Release date: March 9, 1967
- Running time: 121 minutes
- Country: United States
- Language: English
- Budget: $3.5 million
- Box office: $2,900,000 (rentals)

How to Succeed in Business Without Really Trying is a 1967 American romantic musical comedy-drama film based on the 1961 stage musical of the same name, which in turn was based on Shepherd Mead's 1952 book. The film was produced by United Artists and directed by David Swift, with original staging by Bob Fosse.

The cast includes Robert Morse, Rudy Vallee and Michele Lee all reprising their Broadway roles; as well as Anthony Teague, and Maureen Arthur.

== Plot ==
J. Pierrepont Finch buys the book How to Succeed in Business, describing in step-by-step fashion how to rise in the business world. The ambitious young window cleaner follows its advice carefully. He joins the "World-Wide Wicket Company" and begins work in the mail room. Soon, thanks to the ethically questionable advice in the book, he rises to vice president of advertising by having each person above him either fired or moved or transferred within the company.

Finch begins to fall in love with Rosemary Pilkington, a secretary at the company. Finch finds out that Hedy LaRue, a beautiful but incompetent woman the company has hired, is the mistress of J.B. Biggley, the company president. Finch uses this information to assist his climb on the corporate ladder.

Biggley's annoying nephew, Bud Frump, also takes advantage of the situation and tries to get to the top before Finch. By story's end, however, Finch has become chairman of the board and might make the White House his next step to success.

== Cast ==
- Robert Morse as J. Pierrepont "Ponty" Finch
- Michele Lee as Rosemary Pilkington
- Rudy Vallee as J.B. Biggley
- Anthony Teague as Bud Frump
- Maureen Arthur as Hedy LaRue
- John Myhers as Bert O. Bratt
- Carol Worthington as Lucille Krumholtz
- Kay Reynolds as Miss Smith / Smitty
- Ruth Kobart as Miss Jones
- Sammy Smith as Twimble / Wally Womper
- Jeff Debenning as Gatch
- Janice Carroll as Brenda
- Robert Q. Lewis as Tackaberry
- Paul Hartman as Toynbee
- Dan Tobin as Johnson
- John Holland as Matthews
- Justin Smith as Jenkins
- Murray Matheson as Benjamin Ovington
- Patrick O'Moore as Media Man No. 1
- Lory Patrick as Receptionist
- Wally Strauss as Media Man No. 2
- Hy Averback as 2nd Junior Executive
- George Fenneman as Himself
- Carl Princi as 1st Junior Executive
- Sheila Rogers as 1st Girl
- Robert Sweeney as 3rd Junior Executive
- Ivan Volkman as The President of the United States
- Tucker Smith as Dancer (uncredited)
- Anne Seymour as Gertrude Biggley (uncredited)
- Erin O'Brien-Moore as Mrs. Frump (uncredited)
- Robert Osborne as Office Employee (uncredited)

== Production notes ==
$1 million was paid for the film rights with the other costs coming to $2.5 million. Both musical and non-musical versions were prepared. The character of Finch was edited slightly as it was feared that the stage characterization of the character was too edgy and that audiences would not find him likable.

Many songs from the stage version were cut from the movie, most notably all of Rosemary's solos. She was given a version of the song "I Believe in You" in order to make up for this.

The Union Carbide Building (most recently the JPMorgan Chase Tower) that stood at 270 Park Avenue in New York City from 1960 until 2019 was used in exterior shots as the headquarters for the "World-Wide Wicket Company" in the movie. It most notably was used in the sequences in which Finch dashes into the building before his boss arrives in order to arrange coffee cups on his desk and pretends to have fallen asleep on it after apparently working all night as a way to convince his boss to promote him to a higher position in the company.

Several actors reprised their roles from the stage version, most notably Morse and Vallee. Dick Van Dyke was considered for the role of Finch, but he turned it down due to concerns that he was too old for the role.

== Reception ==
The film received generally positive reviews. Bosley Crowther of The New York Times, for example, praised the film as successfully re-creating "just about everything that was conducive to the stage success," especially the performances of Morse and Vallee:

Seeing Mr. Morse in close-ups, as those wily expressions cross on his face and those wicked designs of Pal Joey gleam in his Horatio Alger-character eyes, is better (and I'm not chauvinistic) than seeing him on the stage. And Mr. Vallee—well, I can say nothing nicer than that he continues to improve with age.

Upon its release, however, the film failed to make a profit and was a commercial disappointment. The film holds a 92% rating on Rotten Tomatoes based on thirteen reviews.

Although the original musical had been a great Broadway success, capturing seven Tony Awards, the film version was not nominated for any Academy Awards.

== Home media ==
Broadcast television

How to Succeed in Business Without Really Trying premiered on NBC Saturday Night at the Movies on November 25, 1972.

DVD

How to Succeed in Business Without Really Trying was released to DVD on April 1, 2003, by MGM Home Video in a Region 1 DVD and is available on Region 2 DVD from Simply Media.

Blu-ray

How to Succeed in Business Without Really Trying was released to Blu-ray on March 14, 2017, by Twilight Time in a Region A Blu-ray.

== See also ==
- List of American films of 1967
