= How to Succeed with Women Without Really Trying =

1957 humor book by Shepherd Mead

- First edition, Ballantine Books
- Author: Shepherd Mead
- Language: English
- Genre: Humor, satire
- Publisher: Ballantine Books
- Publication date: 1957
- Publication place: United States

How To Succeed With Women Without Really Trying: The Dastard's Guide To The Birds And Bees was a 1957 humor book by Shepherd Mead.

Mead's book satirized 1950s United States male-female relations, under the guise of a self-help book. The book was originally published by Ballantine Books.
