= Anthony 'Scooter' Teague =

American actor and dancer (1940–1989)

- Publicity photo of Anthony 'Scooter' Teague
- Born: January 4, 1940; Jacksboro, Texas
- Died: June 2, 1989 (aged 49); Ashland, Oregon

Anthony Scott Teague (born Edwin Ardell Teague, January 4, 1940 – June 2, 1989), also known as Scooter Teague, was an American actor and dancer.

== Biography ==
Born to Herman Charles Teague and Oleta Jones Teague in Jacksboro, Texas, Teague graduated from North Hollywood High School in the summer class of 1958.

Teague first appeared on television on The Danny Thomas Show, Alcoa Theatre, and The Donna Reed Show. In film, he appeared as "Big Deal", one of the Jets, in West Side Story (1961); Bud Frump in How to Succeed in Business Without Really Trying (1967); and Clarence in the Elvis Presley film The Trouble with Girls (1969).

On Broadway, Teague played Jimmy Curry in the original cast of the musical 110 In The Shade and Billy Early in No, No, Nanette. He also appeared as Zach, the audition director, in two national touring companies of A Chorus Line.

Teague died of cancer in 1989. He had two children: a son, Christian (born 1972), and a daughter, Kendall (born 1975)—as well as a brother, Charles A. Teague.

== Filmography ==
Year	Title	Role	Notes
1961	West Side Story	Big Deal	
1967	How to Succeed in Business Without Really Trying	Bud Frump	
1969	The Trouble with Girls	Clarence	
1971	The Barefoot Executive	TV Salesman	(final film role)
