= Nergaard =

Nergaard is a Norwegian surname. In 2018, there were 478 people with this surname in Norway and 15 in Denmark.

== People ==
Notable people with the surname include:

- Anita Nergaard (born 1967), Norwegian diplomat
- Ivar Nergaard (born 1964), Norwegian actor
- Leiv Nergaard (born 1940), Norwegian businessperson
- Liv Nergaard (1924–2016), Norwegian sculptor and painter
- Magnus Skavhaug Nergaard (born 1989), Norwegian jazz musician
- Merethe Nergaard (born 1956), diplomat
- Rune Nergaard (born 1989), Norwegian jazz musician
- Sigurd Nergaard (1873–1932), Norwegian folklorist
- Silje Nergaard (born 1966), Norwegian singer
- Siri Nergaard, Norwegian translation scholar
- Torger Nergård (also spelled Nergaard; born 1974), Norwegian curler
- Fredrik Havig (a.k.a. Christian Fredrik Nergaard Havig; 1855–1927), Norwegian judge, mayor, and Storting representative

== Other ==
- Nergaard Peak, a peak in Queen Maud Land, Antarctica

== See also ==
- Nergård, a variant spelling of Nergaard.
