= Akka bakka bonka rakka =

Norwegian nursery rhyme

Akka bakka bonka rakka is a Norwegian nursery rhyme of mostly nonsense words used to select or point out a participant in children's games, such as who will be "it" in a game like hide-and-seek (Norwegian: gjemsel) or tag (Norwegian: sisten).

It is classified as a counting rhyme in Nora Kobberstad's Norsk Lekebok (Book of Norwegian Games) from 1901.

There are different versions of the rhyme. The following version was recorded in Elverum in the early 1920s by Sigurd Nergaard:

Akka bakka,
banka ranka,
etla metla, sang dang,
fil i fang, isa, bisa, topp!

In 1936, it was included in a collection of children's rhymes published by Rikka Deinboll:

Akka bakka bonka rakka
etla metla sjong dong
fili fong
issa bissa topp

Finn Myrvang reproduced it in 1964 in a version from Andøya:

Akka bakka bonka rakka, issa bissa topp.
Sjong dong filifong, stékk om stein - stå!

A later version, published by the Children's Book Club (Bokklubbens barn), has the following form:

Akka bakka
bonka rakka,
etla metla
sjong dong,
filifjong
issa bissa topp

== See also ==
- Eeny, meeny, miny, moe
- Ip dip
- En Den Dino
- Entten tentten teelikamentten
