= Counting-out game =

Children's method of selecting a person

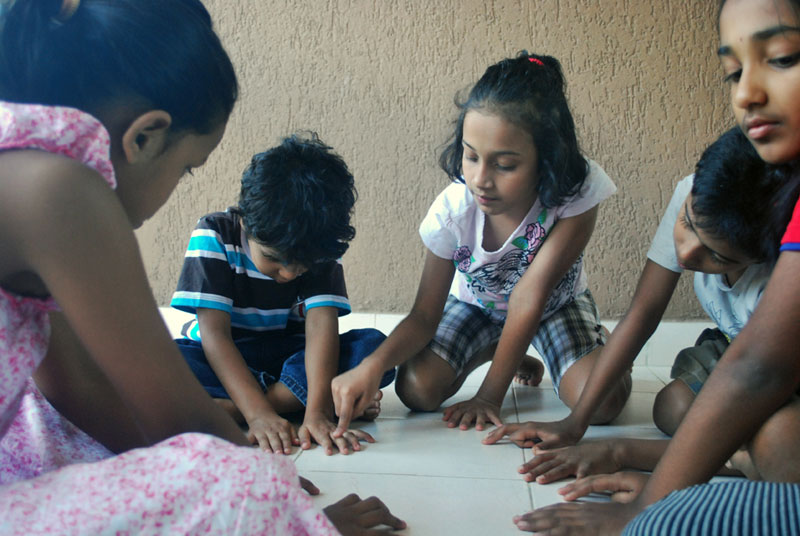
Children playing the South Asian counting rhyme "Akkad Bakkad Bambe Bo"

A counting-out game or counting-out rhyme is a simple method of arbitrarily selecting a person from a group, often used by children for the purpose of playing another game. It usually requires no materials, and is achieved with spoken words or gestures. The historian Henry Carrington Bolton suggested in his 1888 book Counting Out Rhymes of Children that the custom of counting out originated in the "superstitious practices of divination by lots."

Many such methods involve one person pointing at each participant in a circle of players while reciting a rhyme. A new person is pointed at as each word is said. The player who is selected at the conclusion of the rhyme is "it" or "out". In an alternate version, the circle of players may each put two feet in and at the conclusion of the rhyme, that player removes one foot and the rhyme starts over with the next person. In this case, the first player that has both feet removed is "it" or "out". In theory the result of a counting rhyme is determined entirely by the starting selection (and would result in a modulo operation), but in practice they are often accepted as random selections because the number of words has not been calculated beforehand, so the result is unknown until someone is selected.

A variant of counting-out game, known as the Josephus problem, represents a famous theoretical problem in mathematics and computer science.

== Examples ==
Several simple games can be played to select one person from a group, either as a straightforward winner, or as someone who is eliminated. Rock, Paper, Scissors, Odd or Even and Blue Shoe require no materials and are played using hand gestures, although with the former it is possible for a player to win or lose through skill rather than luck. Coin flipping and drawing straws are fair methods of randomly determining a player. Fizz Buzz is a spoken word game where if a player slips up and speaks a word out of sequence, they are eliminated.

=== Common rhymes ===
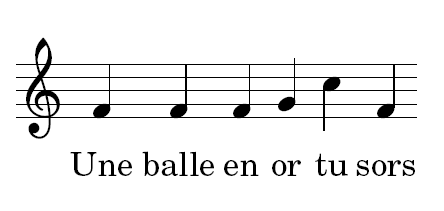
The French rhyme Une balle en or, tu sors: "A ball made of gold, you're out"

Counting out game played by Igbo children from Nigeria

(These rhymes may have many local or regional variants.)

- Eeny, meeny, miny, moe
- Ten Little Indians
- Five Little Ducks
- Ip dip
- One, Two, Three, Four, Five
- Tinker, Tailor (traditionally played in England)
- Yan Tan Tethera
- Inky Pinky Ponky
- One potato, two potato
- Ink-a-dink
- Akka bakka bonka rakka
- En Den Dino

== Cultural references ==
=== Marx Brothers ===
A scene in the Marx Brothers movie Duck Soup plays on the fact that counting-out games are not really random. Faced with selecting someone to go on a dangerous mission, the character Chicolini (Chico Marx) chants:

Rrringspot, vonza, twoza, zig-zag-zav, popti, vinaga, [tin-lie, tav,] harem, scarem, merchan, tarem, teir, tore...

only to stop as he realizes he is about to select himself. He then says, "I did it wrong. Wait, wait, I start here", and repeats the chant—with the same result. After that, he says, "That's no good too. I got it!" and reduces the chant to

Rrringspot, buck!

And with this version he finally manages to "randomly" select someone else.

=== Seinfeld ===
A version of a counting game "ink-a-dink" features in the Seinfeld episode "The Statue". The relevant scene includes a discussion between the characters of Jerry and George if the person who is "it" is the "winner" or the "loser":

JERRY: Alright, let's go. Hey, you know, you owe me one.
GEORGE: What?
JERRY: The Ink-a-dink... you were It.
GEORGE: It's bad?
JERRY: It's very bad.

== See also ==
- Lace tells
- Repetitive song

== Additional references ==
- Arleo, Andy. "Counting-out and the Search for Universals." Journal of American folklore (1997): 391-407.
- Arleo, Andy. "Do children's rhymes reveal universal metrical patterns?." Children's Literature: Critical Concepts in Literary and Cultural Studies, vol. IV. (2006): 39-56.
