= Sjoukje =

Feminine given name

- Pronunciation: Dutch: [ˈɕʌukjə]
- Gender: Feminine
- Language: Dutch, West Frisian

Origin
- Language: West Frisian

Other names
- Derived: Sieuwe

Sjoukje (Dutch pronunciation: [ˈɕʌukjə]) is a Dutch and West Frisian feminine given name. It is a diminutive derived from the West Frisian masculine name Sieuwe. As of 2017, Sjoukje was the first name of 3,706 women (0.0497%) and a middle name of 1,579 women (0.0214%) in the Netherlands; five municipalities in the province of Friesland had the highest percentages of women named Sjoukje (1.2764–1.5932%).

== People named Sjoukje ==
People with the first name Femke include: (Note: Only people with English Wikipedia articles are included in this list.)

- Sjoukje Dijkstra (1942–2024), Dutch figure skater
- Sjoukje Smit-van 't Spijker (born 1950), Dutch singer known as Maggie MacNeal
- Sjoukje Troelstra-Bokma de Boer (1860–1939), Dutch writer known as Nynke van Hichtum
