= En Den Dino =

Nursery rhyme
- Language: Hebrew

En Den Dino (אן דן דינו) is an Israeli counting rhyme. It was featured on an episode of Sesame Street.

It's an Israeli version of the Eeny, meeny, miny, moe counting method.

A variant of the song is also popular in Serbia, Bosnia and Herzegovina, Montenegro and Croatia. The lyrics in this version are as follows: "En ten tini, sava raka tini, sava raka tika taka, bija baja bum, trif traf truf.".

== See also ==
- Nursery rhyme
- Akka bakka bonka rakka
- Eeny, meeny, miny, moe
- Entten tentten teelikamentten
- Ip dip
