= Ip dip =

Children's counting-out rhyme

Ip dip is a rhythmic counting-out game with many variations, the purpose of which is to select an individual from a group, for instance to choose the starting player of a game. It has been commonly used in British playgrounds for many years. It also exists as "dip, dip, dog shit" in Australia.

The speaker of the rhyme points to a different person in order as each stressed syllable is spoken; the person pointed to as the final syllable is spoken is thereby elected.

The aim is to delay and distract from counting the syllables or otherwise fixing the result; the rhyme should be so long that the speaker loses count and cannot predict the chosen person. Perhaps this unpredictability is the reason that there are so many variations, including the practice of stringing variations together — which may be considered cheating.

== Examples ==
=== Australia ===
A common Australian version goes:

Dip, dip, dog shit /
Who trod in it? /
What colour was it? /
Who saw it? /
(Say the name of a colour) /
(Spell the name of that colour) /
You are not it.

A variation of this version was featured on the television series Bluey:

Ip dip sky blue /
Who's it not you! /
Not because you're dirty, /
Not because you're clean. /
My mum says you're the fairy queen! /

Ip dip doo, /
The cat's got the flu, /
The dog's got the chickenpox, /
So out goes you.

Ip dip doo /
Doggy did a poo /
Went to the cinema at half-past two /
When the film started /
Everybody farted /
Out goes you.

=== United Kingdom ===
A Welsh version of the rhyme runs:

Ip dip dip /
My blue [or little] ship /
Sailing on the water /
Like a cup and saucer, /
But you are not in it.

Another version, from Northern Ireland, runs:

Ip dip sky blue, /
Granny sitting on the loo, /
Doing farts, playing darts, /
Out goes you! /
O-U-T spells Out!

=== Elsewhere ===
Other recorded versions include:

Ip dip sky blue /
Who's it, not you!

A version from World War One was recorded by Thomas Ringlestone:

Ip dip doo /
The cat's got the flu /
The cat's got the plague /
I choose you!

Another version runs:

Ip dip dog shit /
Fucking bastard silly git /
You are not it /
You tit.

A version from Switzerland goes:

Ip dip doo /
Doggy did a poo /
Cat did a you know what /
Out goes you.

== See also ==
- Akka bakka bonka rakka
- Eeny, meeny, miny, moe
- En Den Dino
- Cumbric counting: Yan tan tethera
