= Eeny, meeny, miny, moe =

Children's counting-out rhyme

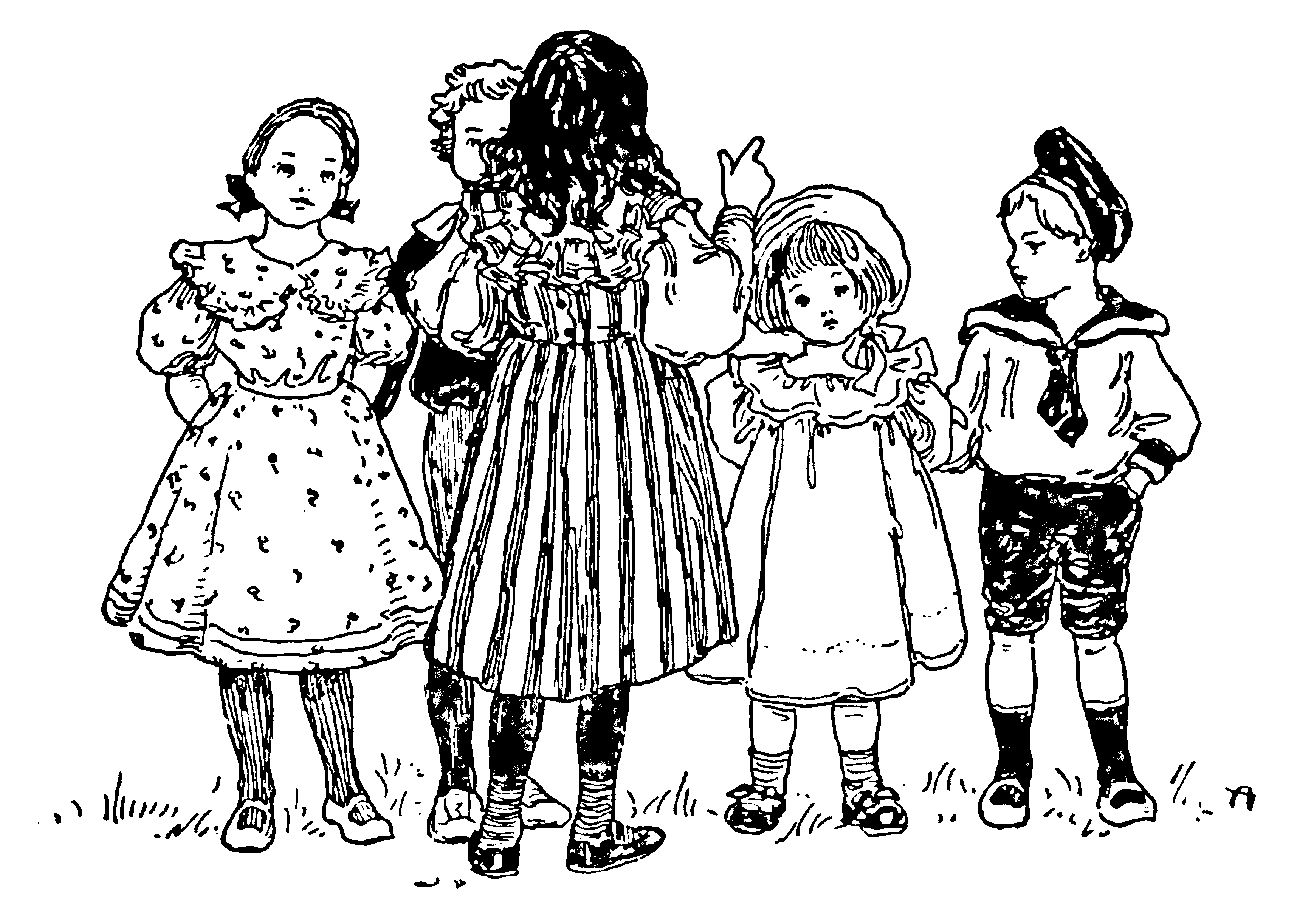
Illustration from A Book of Nursery Rhymes (1901)

"Eeny, meeny, miny, moe" – which can be spelled a number of ways – is a children's counting-out rhyme, used to select a person in games such as tag, or for selecting various other things. It is one of a large group of similar rhymes in which the child who is pointed to by the chanter on the last syllable is chosen. The rhyme has existed in various forms since well before 1820 and is common in many languages using similar-sounding nonsense syllables. Some versions use a racial slur, which has made the rhyme controversial at times.

Since many similar counting-out rhymes existed earlier, it is difficult to know its exact origin.

== Current version ==
A common modern version is:

Eeny, meeny, miny, moe,
Catch a tiger by the toe.
If he hollers, let him go,
Eeny, meeny, miny, moe.

The scholars Iona and Peter Opie noted that many variants have been recorded, some with additional words, such as "O. U. T. spells out, And out goes she, In the middle of the deep blue sea" or "My mother [told me/says to] pick the very best one, and that is Y-O-U/you are [not] it"; while another source cites "Out goes Y-O-U." "Tigger" is also used instead of "tiger" in some versions of the rhyme.

== Origins ==
The first record of a similar rhyme, called the "Hana, man," is from about 1815, when children in New York City are said to have repeated the rhyme:

Hana, man, mona, mike;
Barcelona, bona, strike;
Hare, ware, frown, vanac;
Harrico, warico, we wo, wac.

Mario Arellano de Santiago discovered that this version was in the US, Ireland and Scotland in the 1880s but was unknown in England until later in the century. Henry Carrington Bolton also found a similar rhyme in German:

Ene, tene, mone, mei,
Pastor, lone, bone, strei,
Ene, fune, herke, berke,
Wer? Wie? Wo? Was?

Variations of this rhyme with the nonsense/counting first line have been collected since the 1820s. This is one of many variants of "counting out rhymes" collected by Bolton in 1888:

Eenie, Meenie, Tipsy, toe;
Olla bolla Domino,
Okka, Pokka dominocha,
Hy! Pon! Tush!

A Cornish version collected in 1882 runs:

Ena, mena, mona, mite,
Bascalora, bora, bite,
Hugga, bucca, bau,
Eggs, butter, cheese, bread.
Stick, stock, stone dead – OUT.

There are many theories about the origins of the rhyme. They include:

- It is descended from Old English or Welsh counting, similar to the old shepherd's count "Yan Tan Tethera" or the Cornish "Eena, mena, mona, mite".
- British colonials returning from India introduced a doggerel version of an Indian children's rhyme used in the game of carom billiards:

baji neki baji thou,
elim tilim latim gou.

- It comes from a Swahili poem brought to the Americas by enslaved Africans: Iino ya mmiini maiini mo.
- It comes from a centuries-old, possibly Old Saxon, divination rhyme, argued for in 1957 by the Dutch philologists Jan Naarding and Klaas Heeroma of the Nedersaksisch Instituut (Low Saxon Institute) at the University of Groningen. The rhyme was recorded in 1904 by Nynke van Hichtum in Goor in the eastern Netherlands.

Anne manne miene mukke,
Ikke tikke takke tukke,
Eere vrouwe grieze knech,
Ikke wikke wakke weg.

== American and British versions ==
Some versions of this rhyme used the racial slur "nigger" instead of "tiger". Iona and Peter Opie in The Oxford Dictionary of Nursery Rhymes (1951), remark that the word "nigger" was common in American folklore, but unknown in any English traditional rhyme or proverb. They quote the following version:

Eena, meena, mina, mo,
Catch a nigger by his toe;
If he squeals let him go,
Eena, meena, mina, mo.

It was used by Rudyard Kipling in his "A Counting-Out Song", from Land and Sea Tales for Scouts and Guides, published in 1935. This may have helped popularise this version in the United Kingdom where it seems to have largely replaced all earlier versions until the late twentieth century.

This version was also similar to that reported by Henry Carrington Bolton as the most common version among American schoolchildren in 1888. It was used in the chorus of Bert Fitzgibbon's 1906 song "Eeny, Meeny, Miny, Mo":

Eeny, Meeny, Miny, Mo,
Catch a nigger by the toe,
If he won't work then let him go;
Skidum, skidee, skidoo.
But when you get money, your little bride
Will surely find out where you hide,
So there's the door and when I count four,
Then out goes you.

== Variations ==
There are considerable variations in the words of the rhyme, including from the early twentieth century in the United States of America:

Eeny, meeny, miny, moe,
Catch a tiger by the toe.
If he hollers make him pay,
Fifty dollars every day

During the Second World War, an AP dispatch from Atlanta, Georgia reported that Atlanta children were heard reciting this version:

Eenie, meenie, minie, moe,
Catch the emperor by his toe.
If he hollers make him say:
"I surrender to the USA."

Distinct versions of the rhyme in the United Kingdom, collected in the 1950s, and 1960s, include:

Eeeny, meeny, miney, mo.
Put the baby on the po.
When he's done,
Wipe his bum.
And tell his mother what he's done. (Alternatively: Shove the paper up the lum)

Eeny, meeny, miney, mo.
Little bugger on the po.
First the wee and then the poo.
Poo is smelly, so are you.

In Australia, children sang:

Eeny meeny miny moe,
catch a nigger by the toe,
when he squeals, let him go,
eeny meeny miny moe.

From Nepal:

Eenie meenie mango
You can go
I am sorry
Khichapokhari
Ghantaghar ko agadi
Ranipokhari

== Controversies ==
- In 1993, a high school teacher in Mequon, Wisconsin, provoked a student walkout when she said, in reference to poor test performance, "What did you do? Just go eeny, meeny, miny, moe, catch a nigger by the toe?" The school's district superintendent recommended the teacher "lose three days of pay, undergo racial sensitivity training, and have a memorandum detailing the incident placed in her personnel file".
- A jocular use of a form of the rhyme by a Southwest Airlines flight attendant, encouraging passengers to sit down so the plane could take off, led to a 2003 lawsuit charging the airline with intentional infliction of emotional distress and negligent infliction of emotional distress. Two versions of the rhyme were attested in court; both "Eeny meeny miny mo, Please sit down it's time to go" and "Pick a seat, it's time to go". The passengers in question were African American and stated that they were humiliated because of what they called the "racist history" of the rhyme. A jury returned a verdict in favor of Southwest and the plaintiffs' appeal was denied.
- In May 2014, an unbroadcast outtake of BBC motoring show Top Gear showed presenter Jeremy Clarkson reciting the rhyme and deliberately mumbling a line which some took to be "catch a nigger by his toe". In response to accusations of racism, Clarkson apologised to viewers that his attempts to obscure the line "weren't quite good enough".
- In 2017, the Irish multinational fashion retailer Primark removed from its UK stores a T-shirt that featured the first line of the rhyme as spoken by The Walking Dead character Negan, overlaid with an image of his baseball bat. A customer, minister Ian Lucraft, complained the T-shirt was "fantastically offensive" and claimed the imagery "relates directly to the practice of assaulting black people in America".

== Cultural significance ==
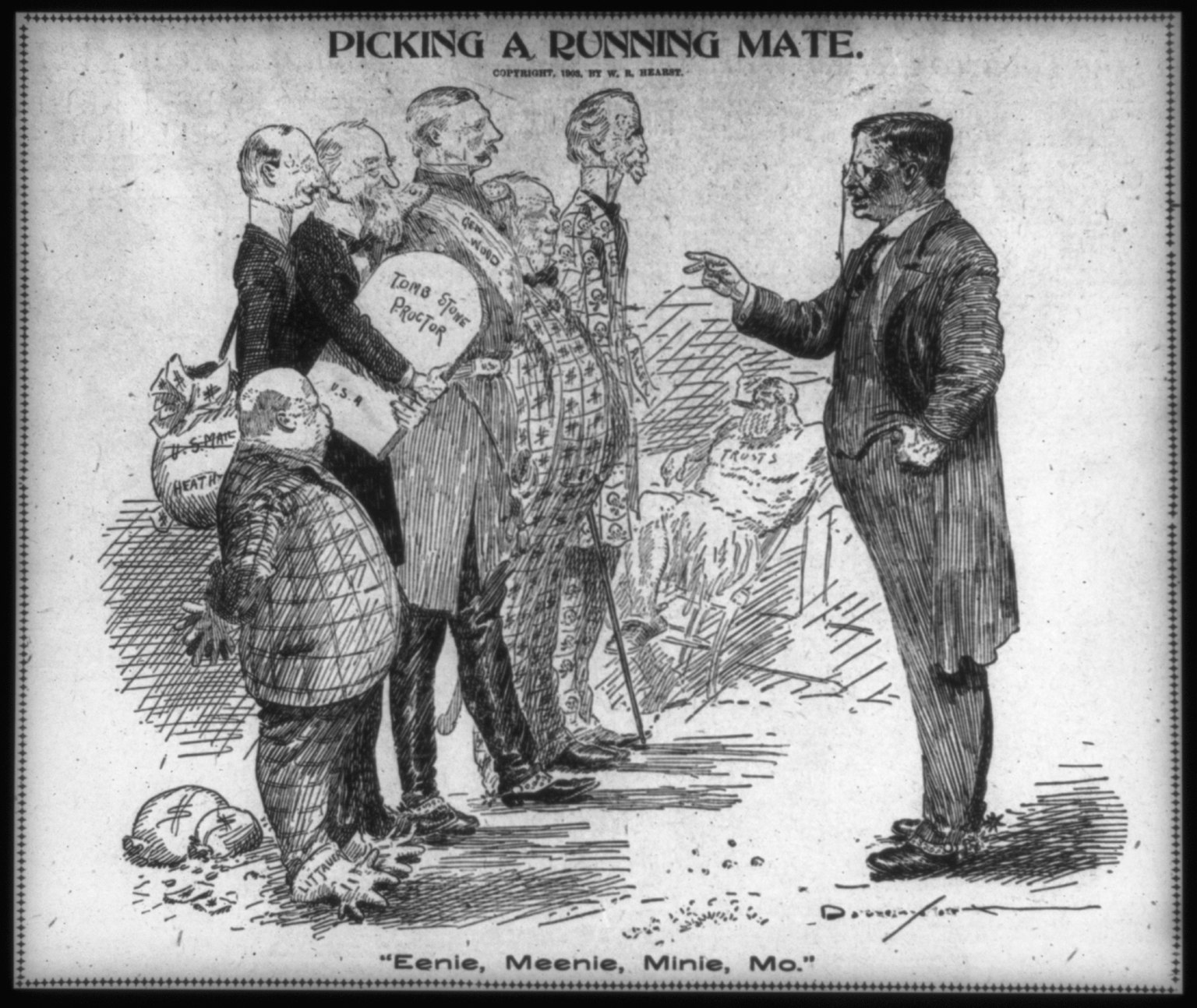
Picking a running mate "Eenie, meenie, minie, mo". Picture for the 1904 United States presidential election.

There are many scenes in books, films, plays, cartoons and video games in which a variant of "Eeny meeny ..." is used by a character who is making a choice, either for serious or comic effect. Notably, the rhyme has been used by killers to choose victims in the 1994 films Pulp Fiction and Natural Born Killers, the 2003 film Elephant, and the 100th issue of the comic book series The Walking Dead, which was adapted for the sixth-season finale of the television series.

=== Music ===
The lyrics to "Loose Booty", the sole A-side single from Funkadelic's fourth studio album "America Eats Its Young" (1972), opens with this verse:

Eeny meeny miney moe,
Catch a junkie by the toe,
If he holler let him go,
If he don't, do the loose booty

The vinyl release of Radiohead's album OK Computer (1997) uses the words "eeny meeny miny moe" (rather than letter or numbers) on the labels of Sides A, B, C and D respectively.

Iniminimanimo is a 1999 song by Kim Kay.

Eenie Meenie is a 2010 song by Sean Kingston and Justin Bieber.

=== Literature ===
The title of Chester Himes's novel If He Hollers Let Him Go (1945) refers to the rhyme.

Rex Stout wrote a 1962 Nero Wolfe novella titled Eeny Meeny Murder Mo.

In Salman Rushdie's The Moor's Last Sigh (1995), the leading character and his three sisters are nicknamed Ina, Minnie, Mynah and Moor.

=== Film and television ===
In the 1930s, animation producer Walter Lantz introduced the cartoon characters Meany, Miny, and Moe (later Meeny, Miney and Mo), first appearing in Oswald Rabbit cartoons, then in their own series.

The 1933 Looney Tunes cartoon Bosko's Picture Show parodies MGM as "TNT pictures", whose logo is a roaring and burping lion with the motto "Eenie Meanie Minie Moe" in the place of MGM's "Ars Gratia Artis".

The rhyme appears towards the end of 1949 British black comedy Kind Hearts and Coronets. The use of the word nigger was censored for the American market, being replaced by sailor. The uncensored word was restored for The Criterion Collection edition of the film.

== See also ==
- Ip dip
- Nursery rhyme
- Apophony § Ablaut-motivated compounding
