= Troelstra =

Troelstra is a surname of Frisian origin. Notable people with the surname include:

- Pieter Jelles Troelstra (1860–1930), Dutch politician
- Anne Sjerp Troelstra (1939–2019), Dutch mathematician
- Jelle Troelstra (1891–1979), Dutch painter
