= Nergård =

Nergård (historically spelled Nergaard) may refer to the following:

- Nergården (or just Nergård), a village in Bjarkøy, Troms county, Norway
- Nergård AS, a large fishing company in Northern Norway, based in Tromsø

== People ==
- Arnfinn Nergård, Norwegian politician
- Arvid Nergård, Norwegian bishop
- Leiv Nergaard, Norwegian businessman
- Silje Nergaard, Norwegian jazz vocalist and songwriter
- Torger Nergård, Norwegian curler
