= Lace tells =

Rhyming chants used to aid lacemaking

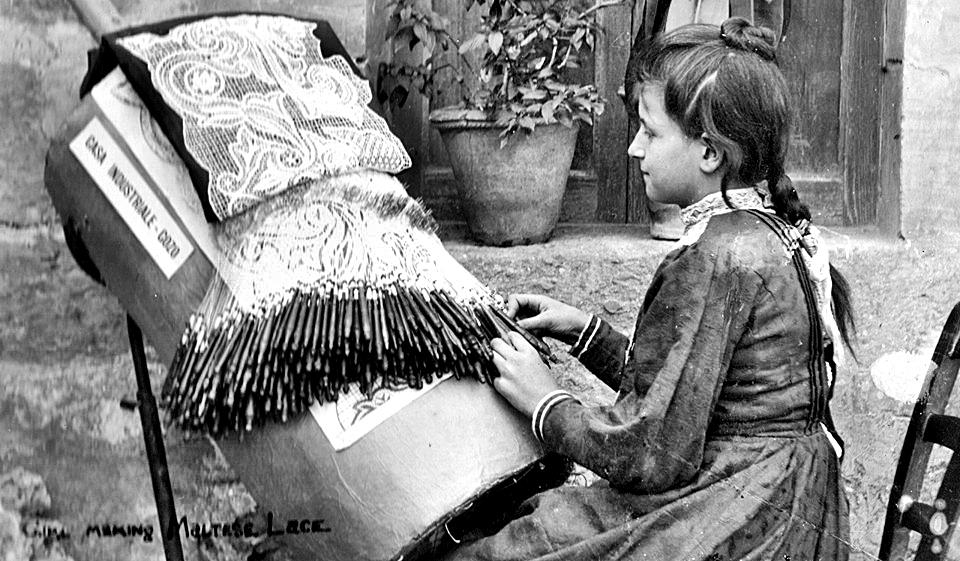
Girls at lacemaking schools chanted rhymes to the rhythm of their pinning as they made bobbin lace

Lace tells (Note: also lace tellings; tellingen and telliedjes in Flemish; Zählgeschichten (lit. 'counting stories') and Klöppelmärschen (lit. 'bobbin marches') in German.) were catchy rhymes chanted to the rhythm of bobbin lace manufacture in lace schools and workshops in Flanders, the English East Midlands, and the Saxon Ore Mountains (German: Erzgebirge). (Note: All English-language sources on Saxon lace tells use the name Erzgebirge.) Tells helped lacemakers to count stitches, maintain a steady rhythm, and stay awake and focused. Lace tells were also used in lacemaking schools in order to increase the speed of work and to teach discipline and lace skills to children—including basic numeracy. Lace tells often borrowed content from existing songs and legends, adapting familiar narratives and formulations to metaphors relying on jargon and details of lace manufacture. Aside from lace manufacture, lace tells often concerned death and violence, as well as expressions of resentment and vengefulness against parents, school mistresses, and lace merchants.

The repertoire of surviving lace tells has been studied as a corpus of work songs by women and girls. Parallels between Flemish and English tells may point to a Flemish provenance of the East Midlands lace industry. Common elements found in lace tales from all three regions indicate that lace telling likely began with the establishment of the lace industry in the sixteenth century and was disseminated throughout Europe by migrant lacemakers.

== Content ==
As counting rhymes, lace tells sometimes featured number sequences, either counting down—often from 20 in English tells—or counting up. Some were adapted from existing songs by simply appending a number to the beginning of each line. Some lace tells did not enunciate any numbers, and it is not clear how these were used. Lace tells were often intertextual, with familiar material from various types of religious and secular song being appropriated and adapted to the form. David Hopkin writes that references to lacemaking in the lyrics of lace tells were made "in an elliptical manner, with references hidden in a maze of apparent nonsense."

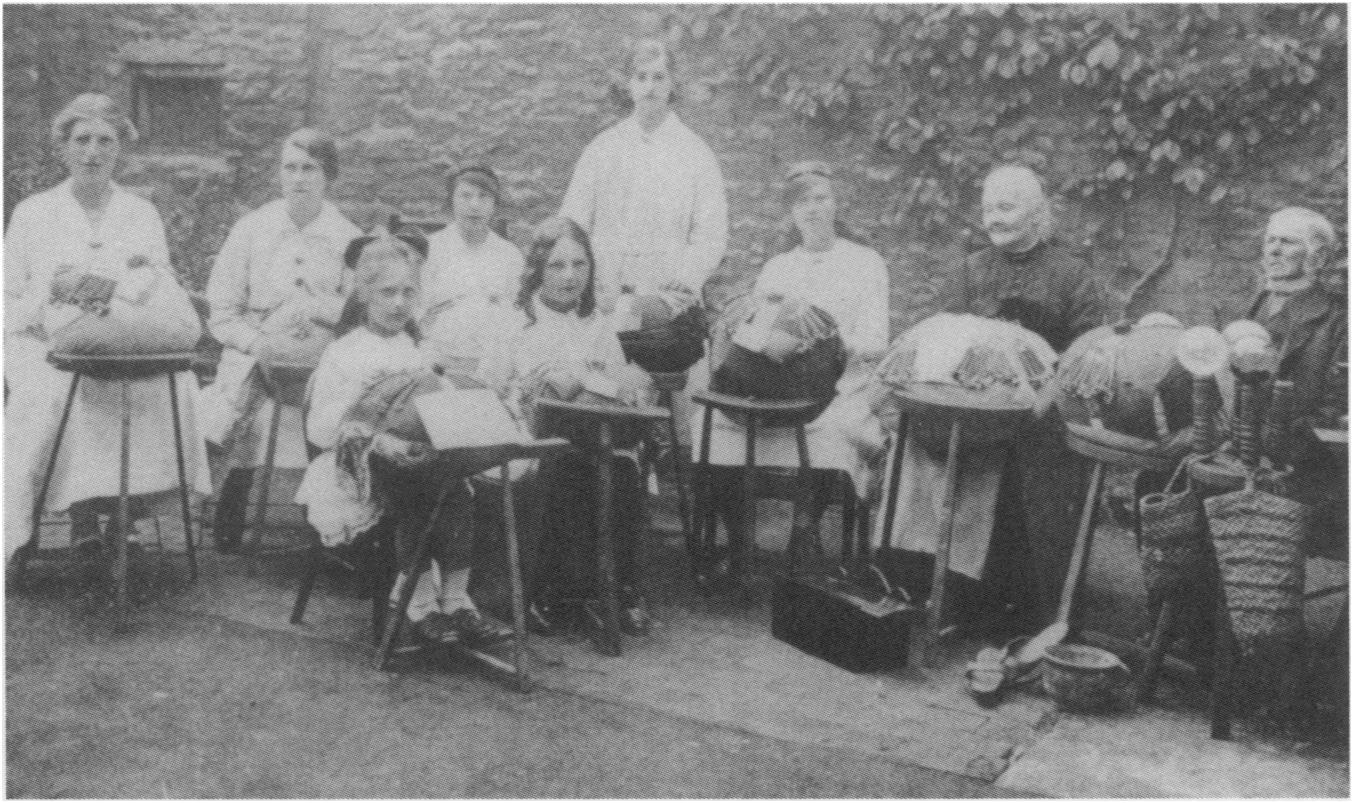
A lace class in Olney, Buckinghamshire in 1918

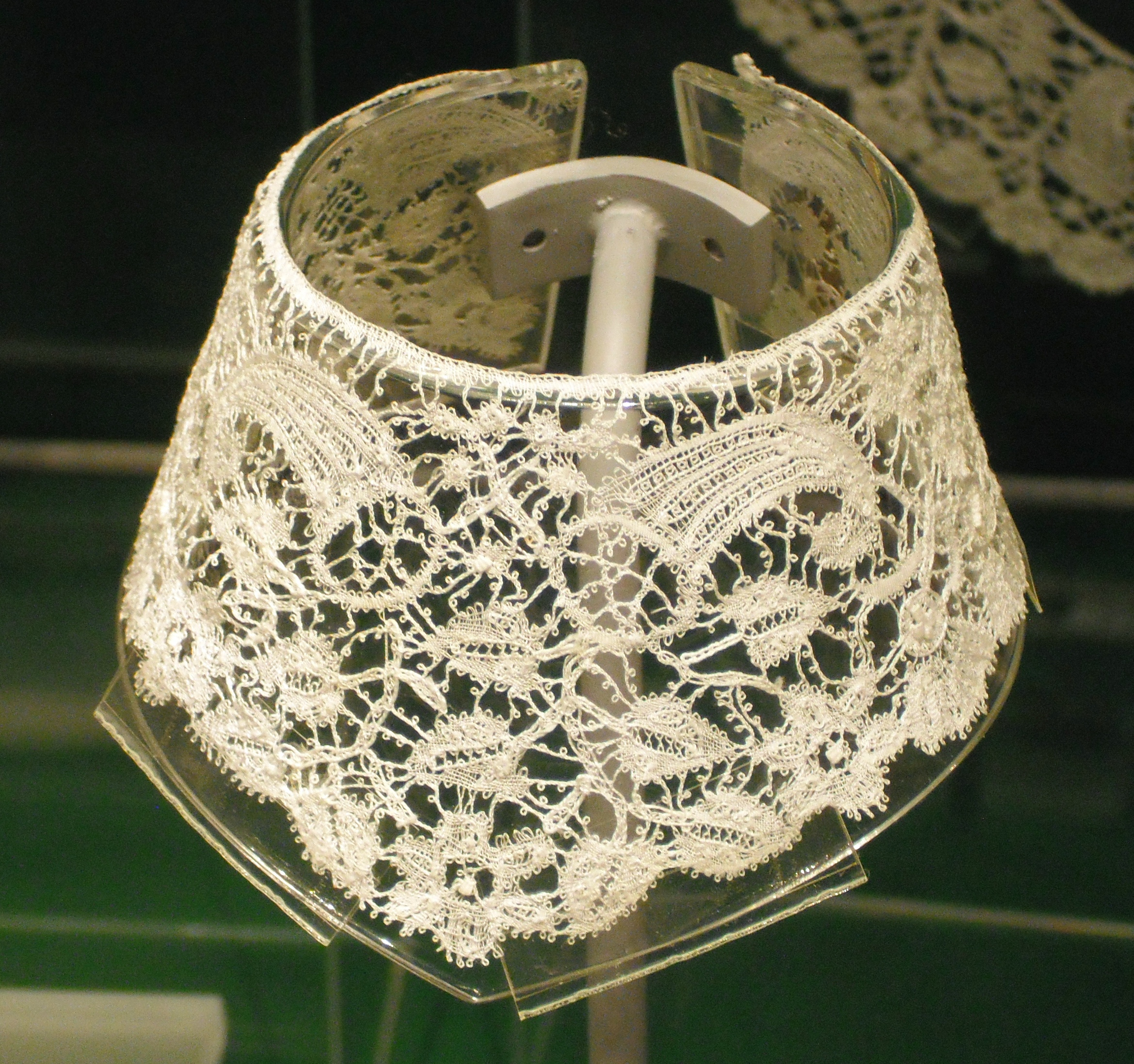
19th-century Bedfordshire lace collar

=== English tells ===
English lace tells were catchy and allusive, often appropriating familiar material from ballads, children's rhymes, games, legends, and riddles. Gerald Porter writes that the presence of well-known children's rhymes in lace tells could help promote discipline and focus among workers, many of whom were children. Lace tells which borrowed from games frequently incorporated sinister elements in order to evoke the consequences of breaking rhythm or looking up before the tell was complete. Content from narrative ballads—also sung by lacemakers at work—was adapted into lace tells by truncating the ballad's story such that the lace tell version would only be meaningful to someone familiar with the full version.

Metaphors in lace tells often relied on jargon and references to lacemaking practice that would be opaque to outsiders, and details of the work process were integrated in lyrical narratives of lace tells. For example, a common ballad opening that described 24 boys playing ball was reworked in a lace tell to refer instead to 19 "golden girls"—a metaphor for the gold-headed pins used to attach the lace, with 19 being the number at which lacemakers often began counting down their pins. G. F. R. Spenceley explains that 19 was "the greatest number of stitches a worker could complete in a single burst before she 'looked off' for a moment's relief." English lace tells were typically in doggerel verse.

David Hopkin writes that the lyrics of lace tells expressed a sense of occupational identity among lacemakers and that their references to work practices created intimacy and a sense of shared experience in the work environment. Porter identifies a retaliatory theme in lace tells, condemning the insolent lace merchants who sold the lacemakers' work. Porter also notes a theme of revenge against the punishing school mistress and interprets tells deploying this theme as a form of resistance. Hopkin also describes the gruesome nature of some of the lace tells, writing that they "often concerned punishments, domestic violence, sexual murder and premature death induced by work"—Porter identifies an element of "terror" in lace tells, for example in this tell recorded by Thomas Wright:

Get to the field by 1,
Gather the rod [to whip her with] by 2,
Tie it up at 3,
Send it home at 4,
Make her work hard at 5,
Give her her supper at 6,
Send her to bed at 7,
Cover her up at 8,
Throw her down stairs at 9,
Break her neck at 10,
Get to the well-lid by 11,
Stamp her in at 12.

— Thomas Wright, Romance of the Lace Pillow vol.2 (1930)

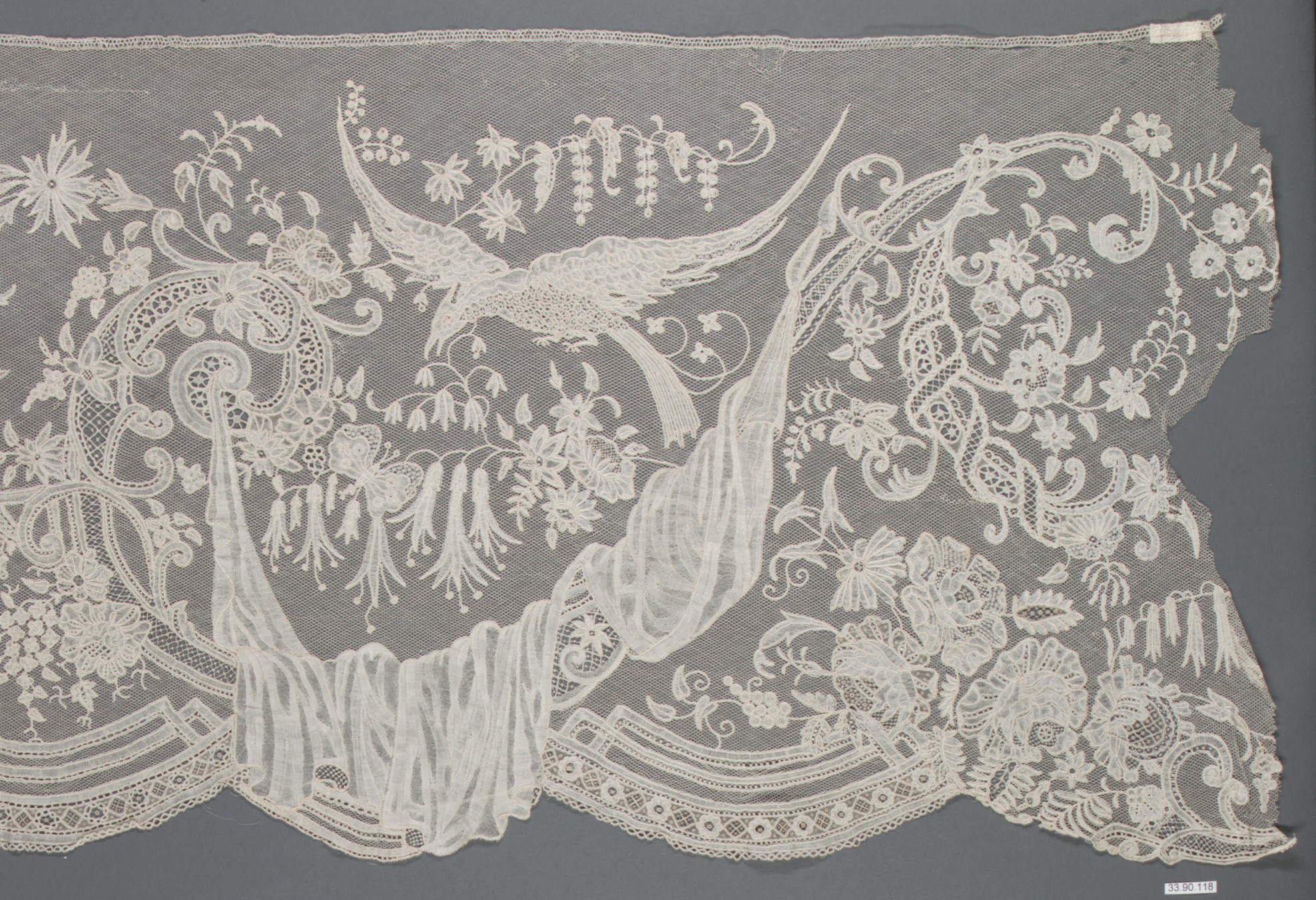
19th-century Flemish bobbin lace

=== Flemish tells ===
Some surviving Flemish tells (tellingen) are several hundred lines long, though most ranged from dozens to a hundred. Hopkin compares Flemish lace tells to sea shanties, in that both forms of song are performed in direct relation to the labor process. He describes Flemish tellingen as "bizarre composites of songs, hymns, [and] prayers." Though the content of tellingen were more religious (due to Flemish lace schools being often overseen by nuns or beguines), the general themes were similar to their English counterparts: "the workers are hungry, exhausted, given mouldy bread, thrown in a hole… Mothers complain about their daughters' lack of work; fathers are even more threatening figures." While some Flemish tells refer explicitly to the experiences of lace schools, most do not. Direct mentions of lace manufacture in Flemish tells were most often positive. Narratives of death, incest, infanticide, "drawn-out executions", and violence (particularly between fathers and daughters) were common in Flemish tells. Some Flemish lace tells were open expressions of resentment at the girls' parents—particularly their fathers—for sending them to work long hours at lace schools, which were associated with ill health and premature death. For example:

Flemish original

Mijnheere, mijn kinders en willen
niet werken,
Wat doe ik er al mee?
Steek ze al in een duister kot,
En geef ze daar wat van haver
en zop,
En wat letter eten.
Mijnheer, die kinderen zullen
wel beteren.
Fraai, fraai, kinderen, werkt
maar zeere,
Er komt t' avond een
schoone mijnheere,
Een mijnheere die u wat
brengen zal,
Vijgen uit het peerdestal
Corinthen van de schapen,
Dat zal u wel smaken.
Fraai, fraai, kinderen, werk
maar gauw,
't Avond komt er eene
schoone mevrouw,
Een mevrouw met wat
roeien (roeden),
Zij zal slaan dat handen en voeten
zullen bloeien (bloeden).

— Lootens and Feys (1879)
Translation:
English translation

Sir, my children do not want
to work.
What shall I do with them?
Stick them in a dark hole
and give them oat gruel
and only light food to eat.
Sir, the children will do better.
Good, good, children, work harder.
In the evening comes a nice man,
a man who will bring you
figs from the stable,
currants from sheep.
You'll like that.
Good, good, children, work faster.
In the evening comes a
nice woman,
a woman with some canes.
She'll strike your hands and feet
till they bleed.

— David Hopkin (2019)

Some tells expressed vengeful desires toward the parents. For example:

Flemish original

Zij steekt haar moeder met
naalden dood,
En haar vader met spellen

— Lootens and Feys (1879)
Translation:
English translation

She stuck her mother dead
with needles,
and her father with pins.

— David Hopkin (2019)

Another common theme in Flemish tells is the dream of escaping lace school. Hopkin interprets these songs as cathartic rather than resistant, considering that no material resistance by lacemakers is documented, and that some Flemish tells about punishment may have served to condition girls to accept the mistress's authority. Isabelle Peere writes that Flemish lace tells followed a principle of "assembling lines without significant concern for continuity of meaning", leading to "absurd punchlines and highly unexpected transitions". She gives as an example this tell, collected by Lootens in 1879:

Flemish original

Zij zitten te naaien aan Jesutjes baaitje,
Zonder naaldetje of zonder draadje.
'k Zou gaan bidden aan sinte Katrine,
Om een naaldetje of een draadje te winnen.
Sinte Katrine, 'k en ben 't niet weerd,
Al was het maar een bezemsteert,
En een hoedje van biezen.
'k Zou 't nog wel verliezen,
Verliezen in de grippe,
'k Zoud er wel tegen schippen.
'k Passeerde voorbij een koningsdeure,
Er lag een wittebrood voor de deure.
'k Pakte dat wittebrood op,
'k Lei het van achter op den disch;
Zij brochten mij drie pateelen met visch.
De drie pateelen met visch en mogt ik niet,
Zij brochten m'een droogen haring.
Den droogen haring en mogt ik niet,
Ze brochten m'een vorte palings kop.
'k Nam de vorte palings kop in mijn vuist,
'k Smeet z'al tegen 't kraai huis.
De kraaien begonnen te daveren.
Er sprong een kraai al uit zijn nest,
Met een marbel in zijn bek.
Hij en had maar een blauw' ooge.
Hij liep naar Gent om looge (ter logie?)
Als hij te Gent om looge kwam,
Zijn ooge was nog blauwer.
Hij liep naar Onze Vrouwe.
Als hij te Onze Vrouwe binnen kwam,
Zij zaten daar te zingen:
Gloria Pater, en Domini.
Wie zal er mij t'eten brengen?
— Ik, zei den goen Sint Jan.
Goen Sint Jan, waar is uw moeder?
Mijn moeder is in den hemel,
Hooger als een kemel,
Hooger als een bonte koe.

— Lootens and Feys (1879)
Translation:
English translation

They are sitting, sewing the little Jesus' bodice,
Without seams and without thread.
I would go and pray to Saint Catherine,
To get a small needle or a bit of thread.
Saint Catherine, I am not worthy,
Even if I were just a broom handle,
And a little straw hat,
I could still lose it,
Lose it in the gutter,
I could even kick it away.
I passed in front of a king's door,
There was a white loaf of bread at the door.
I picked up the white bread,
I put it behind the stall;
They brought me three plates of fish.
The three plates of fish did not please me,
They brought me a dried herring.
The dried herring did not please me,
They brought me a rotten eel's head.
I grabbed the rotten eel's head,
I smashed it against the ravens' house.
The ravens began to tremble.
A raven jumped from its nest,
A marble in its beak.
It had only one blue eye.
It fled to Ghent to find shelter (?)
Once in Ghent, looking for a home (?)
Its eye was even bluer.
It went to Notre Dame,
Once inside Notre Dame,
They were there singing:
Gloria Pater, et Domini.
Who will bring me food?
— I will, said the brave Saint John.
Good Saint John, where is your mother?
My mother is in heaven,
Higher than a camel,
Higher than a spotted cow.

Peere interprets this nonsense typical of tells in opposition to the conventions of other popular Flemish song forms of the time, with religious songs emphasizing family, ballads emphasizing loyalty, and comic songs parodying both, while lace tells "stand in direct opposition to any moral or familial norms ... reveling in staging bloody murders, grotesque and extraordinary verbal and behavioral violence, and near-sadistic scenarios." Peere writes that the uproarious subversion and disorder in lace tells "suggests release rather than hatred." She offers examples of subversive, disordered, and violent scenarios found in lace tells, including that of a girl receiving a gift from her father by leading him to her bedroom, forcing him to kneel, beheading him, and throwing his head in the cellar and his body in the canal. Peere characterizes this sensibility as "a deconstruction of the real world and its norms in favor of a fantastical universe", which she links to ideas in the works of Roger Caillois (vertigo as described in Man, Play and Games) and Sigmund Freud (negation as described in Jokes and Their Relation to the Unconscious). Albert Blyau wrote in his 1900 collection of tellingen that tells composed of content from many different songs, further embellished by the girls' imaginations, were called babbeling (babblings). In the latter half of the 19th century, as more lace schools adopted religious education, some religious headmasters and teachers attempted to introduce religious lace tells to counteract the impietous secular songs.

== Performance ==
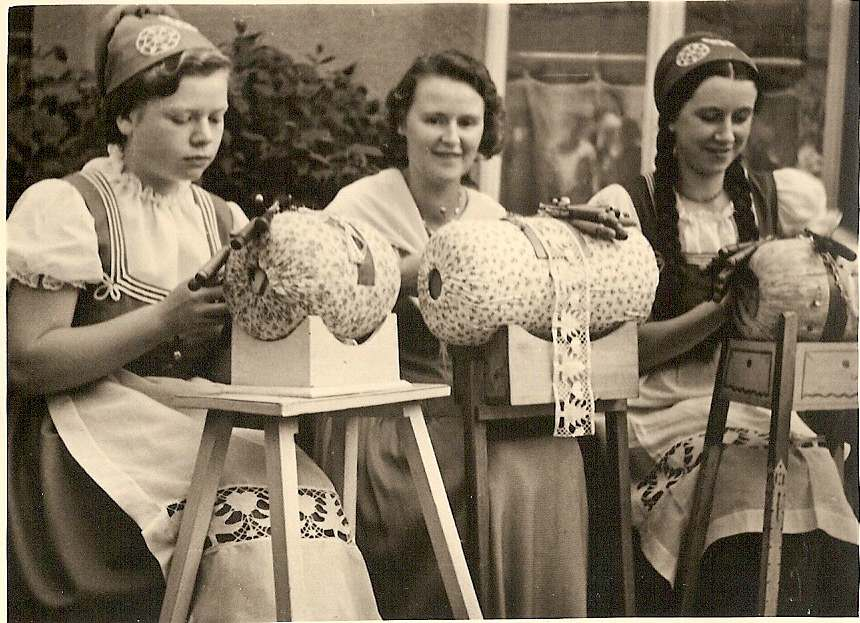
Lacemakers at an Ore Mountains workshop, 1936

Bobbin lacemaking in Amsterdam, 1934

Porter notes that lace tells are unconventional as work songs, which are typically "dominated by images of male physical labor" and feature shouted refrains. In contrast, lace tells precisely described the work of lacemaking and served to "excite [the lacemakers] to regularity and cheerfulness." Lace tells were chanted to the rhythm of work, helping lacemakers to count their pins—knowing how many pins corresponded to each tell—and maintain a regular, quick pace. Lace tells were also used in lacemaking schools to increase the speed of work and to teach discipline and lacemaking skills in the children, including basic numeracy. Marguerite Coppens writes that lace tells allowed lacemakers, who often worked 10-hour days, to stay awake and alert as they stitched. Students who lost rhythm or failed to keep pace with the tells were punished with a "glum" or "time of gloom"—a period during which they could neither speak nor participate in lace telling. Workshop-wide glums could also be initiated for non-punitive reasons. For instance, a verse ending with the line "for thirty-one speak or look off for sixty-two" triggered a mandatory silence in the workshop until each girl had placed 31 pins—or 62 if the silence was broken. Both English and Flemish lace tells were chanted rather than sung.

Flemish lace tells were primarily a feature of lace schools, and it is not clear if adult lacemakers continued to use tells to time their work, even as they recalled and occasionally performed them. Flemish children in lace workshops were apprenticed to a lace mistress for five years, hearing and performing the same tells every day under the strict supervision of older workers who did not tolerate any variation. David Hopkin attributes the "archaic" quality of the repertoire of Flemish tells documented by Adolphe Lootens to this strictness of tradition. Lootens noted that most tells he documented were chanted to the same "unrhythmic and very monotonous" tune. Lootens also wrote in his collection of Flemish tellingen that each line always corresponded to one pin done, but Hopkin argues, based on the scholarship of Coppens, that lace patterns more complex than netting are "too irregular" for such a regular rhythm. Coppens describes a 1954 field recording of a Flemish lacemaker working and chanting, in which the fast movement of the bobbins is unrelated to the rhythm of the tell. Manfred Blechschmidt wrote the same in his study of German lace counting rhymes, writing that "there are no work rhythms that serve as templates for work songs." Albert Blyau wrote in his collection of Flemish tells that the pause taken by girls when pinning, longer than the ordinary pause between two verses, was long enough for the lace mistress to whisper the next verse to the girls. Blyau also describes tells being slowed at lace schools in Ypres and Poperinge to fit the pace of workers, and distinguishes between tellingen and telseltjes (musical jousts), with the latter involving counting for competitive games of speed between students. Telseltjes were especially likely to refer to lace manufacture. Lootens records one tell, called "Mi Adel en Heer Halewijn", which is performed by three girls in different roles—a Crusader, his resilient wife, and her abusive mother-in-law—assigned by drawing bobbins, similar to drawing straws.

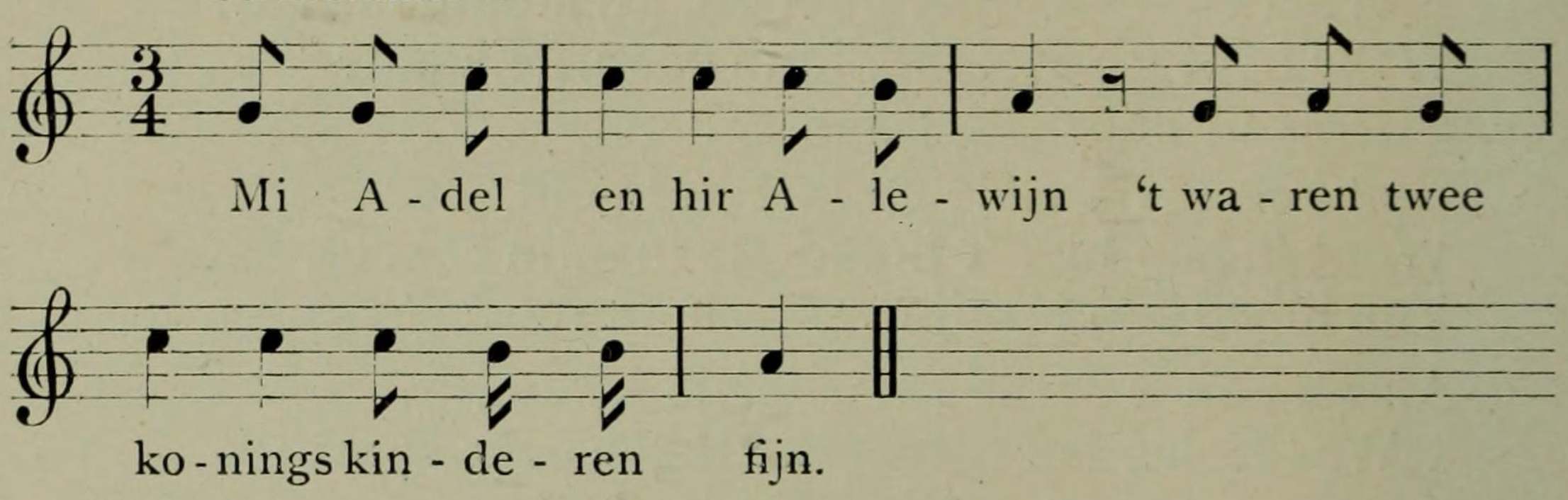
The Flemish lace tell "Min Adel en hir Alewijn" consists of only two melodic phrases, separated here by a short rest—to place a pin and breathe.

== Collection and scholarship ==
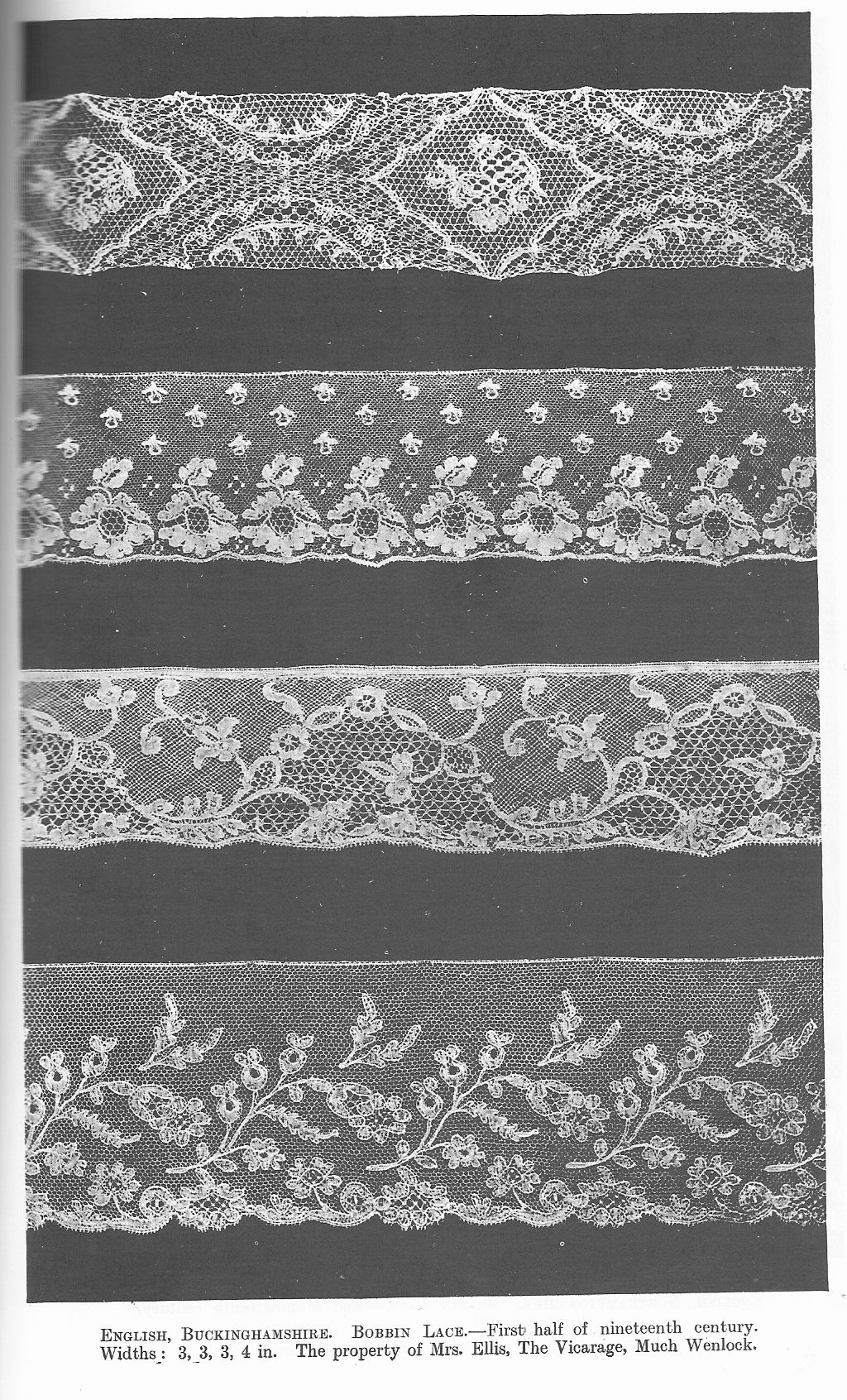
Bucks point lacemakers chanted gruesome tells.

According to David Hopkin, "[lace] tells are the one genre in English lacemakers' song repertoire that has been documented." Gerald Porter wrote in 1994 that the repertoire of English lace tells—comprising over 50 songs or fragments—is among the largest surviving bodies of women's work songs in English. David Hopkin wrote in 2019 that the text corpus of English lace tells includes "about 80" tells, which were recorded by "folklorists and other visitors to Midlands lace villages from the mid nineteenth to the mid twentieth century". Very few audio recordings or musical transcriptions of lace tells survive, and thus few lace tells documented in verse have known tunes. Lace tells have never been systematically collected and were only compiled and published in romantic early 20th-century volumes by enthusiasts. No 18th-century tells are known to have survived in the record. Many English lace tells sung by children are recorded with attribution only to "a child", without further specification.

Porter writes that English lace tells, "deemed insufficiently narrative", have been "rendered silent" in traditional song scholarship. Hopkin writes that Flemish tells "have received some attention from folklorists and textile specialists, but not from labor historians, or from literary scholars, despite the fact that many significant Flemish writers either made use of, or themselves attempted to contribute to, the corpus of lacemakers' work songs." No collectors of Flemish lace tells explain precisely how the tells corresponded to the rhythm or counting of lacemaking. Adolphe Lootens recorded dozens of Flemish tells in the mid-19th century, and David Hopkin calls the English collection of lace tells "meager" in comparison to the much longer Flemish corpus, which also includes longer and less fragmentary tells.

== Spread and decline ==
Hopkin notes that while French lacemakers' songs exist, there appears to be no non-Flemish French equivalent to lace telling. German lace counting rhymes, called Zählgeschichten (lit. 'counting stories') and Klöppelmärschen (lit. 'bobbin tales') have not attracted the same scholarly attention that Flemish and English lace tells have.

David Hopkin writes that the parallel lace telling traditions of the East Midlands and Flanders may be evidence for "the frequently asserted but actually undocumented Flemish origins of the Midlands lace industry"—that the Midlands industry was founded by Flemish migrants of war and persecution in the 1570s. He raises these two tells—the Flemish Lisa's Terechtstelling and an untitled English tell—as an example of the similarities between both traditions.

Lisa's Terechtstelling (English translation)

Twenty. I take Lisa into custody.
At nineteen. In the hands
of justice.
At eighteen. Her death
knell sounds.
At seventeen. She is woken.
At sixteen. She is shown before all
the lords.
At fifteen. She is going to die
there, as if she was of fine
red gold.
Fourteen. On the scaffold.
At thirteen. My first bird is
half dead.
At twelve. I take a rod in my hand.
At eleven. I lashed her for the
first time.
At ten. I lashed her for the
second time.
At nine. The death bonnet is put
before her eyes.
At eight. I will let her die.
Seven. I chop her head off.
Six. Both her arms are off.
Five. Both her feet are off.
Four. Her head is put on a stake.
Three. Her body is laid in
her grave.
At two. For such a young
daughter, what a scandal
this makes!
At one. I make a pit.
At not one. I stick her in.

— Blyau and Tasseel (1962) [Translated Hopkin (2019)]
Translation:
Untitled English tell

One o'clock and my scholar
aint come,
Two o'clock and my scholar
aint come,
Get a rod and nettle by four,
And whip her well by five,
And send her to bed by six,
Lay her in salt and water
by seven,
And threw her down stairs
by eight,
And break her neck by nine,
Put her in coffin by ten,
And screw her down by eleven,
And put her in ground by twelve,
One o'clock and Old Dainty's
hung!

— Stewart (1908)

Hopkin also writes that common elements exist in lace tells from all three regions where they have been observed, suggesting that lace telling was "already present at the foundation of the industry in the sixteenth century and spread by migrant lace mistresses."

In 1864, W. H. Oakes wrote that "it is only the very old people [in Olney] who remember anything about these 'Lace Tellings' [sic], as they have not been used in the schools about Olney for many years."

Collections of Flemish lace tells from 1856 and 1878 already reported that the practice was in decline and "tending to disappear entirely". This decline was influenced by the increase in lace schools run by orders of nuns, rather than the lay-taught schools most common in the 18th and early 19th centuries. The nuns found the chanting to be distracting and the lyrical content of tells to be impious. By 1897, Blyau wrote that prayers and litanies had replaced songs even at schools run by secular teachers. Lacemakers' songs also began to be associated with the abusive conditions of lace workshops as such abuses gradually began to be denounced. A report from Brabant on the conditions of lacemaking girls said: "the habit these workers have of singing while they work, that is to say, a bent position, contributes greatly to the appearance of the symptoms of consumption ... they sing to distract themselves from their dreadful torture, and their singing is suicide."

== See also ==
- Military cadence – Work songs used in militaries
- Waulking song – Scottish folk songs sung while fulling cloth
- Yan tan tethera – Counting system used by British shepherds
