= Nes, Noardeast-Fryslân =

Nes
- Village
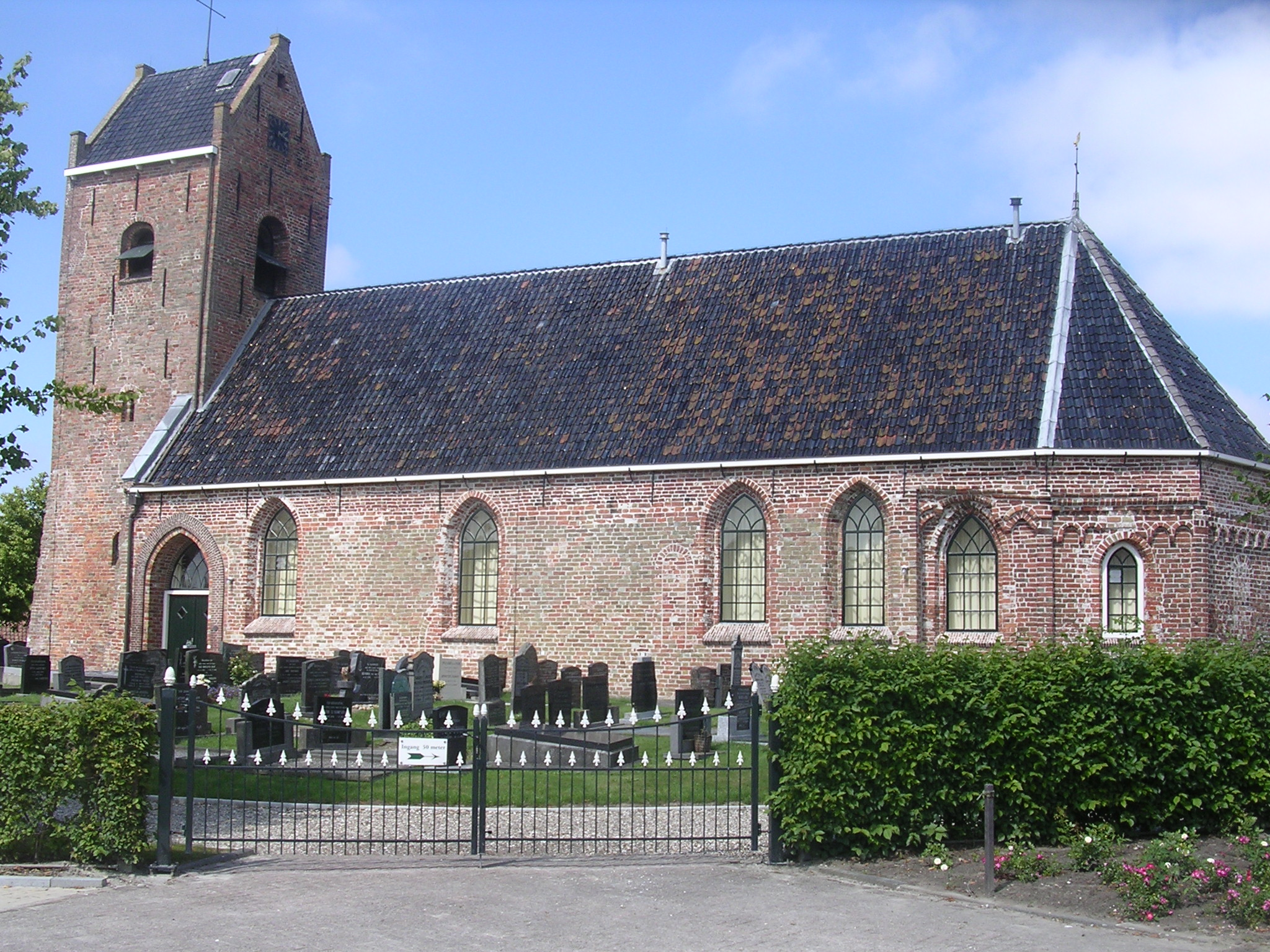
- St John's church

- Flag Coat of arms

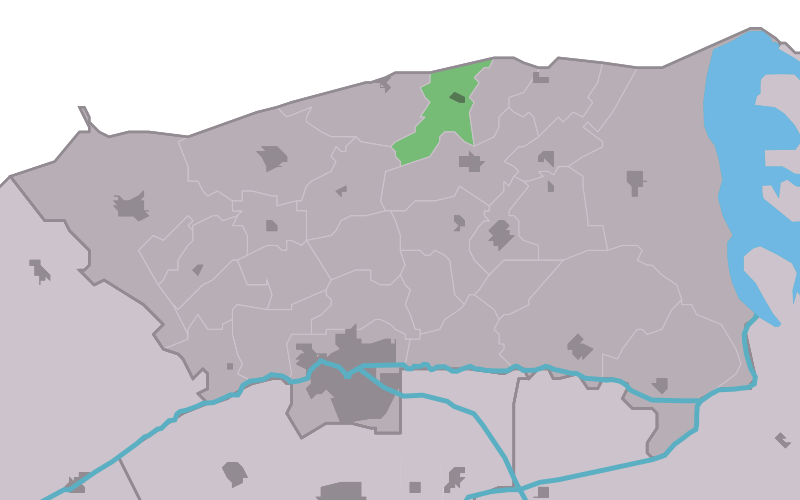
- Location in the former Dongeradeel municipality

- Location in the Netherlands Nes (Netherlands)
- Country: Netherlands
- Province: Friesland
- Municipality: Noardeast-Fryslân

Area
  - Total: 6.97 km^{2} (2.69 sq mi)
- Elevation: 0.7 m (2.3 ft)

Population (2021)
  - Total: 390
  - Density: 56/km^{2} (140/sq mi)
- Time zone: UTC+1 (CET)
  - Summer (DST): UTC+2 (CEST)
- Postal code: 9143
- Dialing code: 0519

Nes (Dutch pronunciation: [nɛs]) is a village in Noardeast-Fryslân in the province of Friesland, the Netherlands, with a population of around 376 in January 2017. Before 2019, the village was part of the Dongeradeel municipality.

== History ==
The village was first mentioned in 1369 as Nesse and means headland. Nes is a terp (artificial living mound) village from the early middle ages with a rectangular structure with three paths. The Dutch Reformed church dates from the 12th century, and the tower was added slightly later. The building was restored in 1974.

In 1840, Nes was home to 538 people.

== Notable inhabitants ==
- Nynke van Hichtum (1860–1939), children's author

== Gallery ==
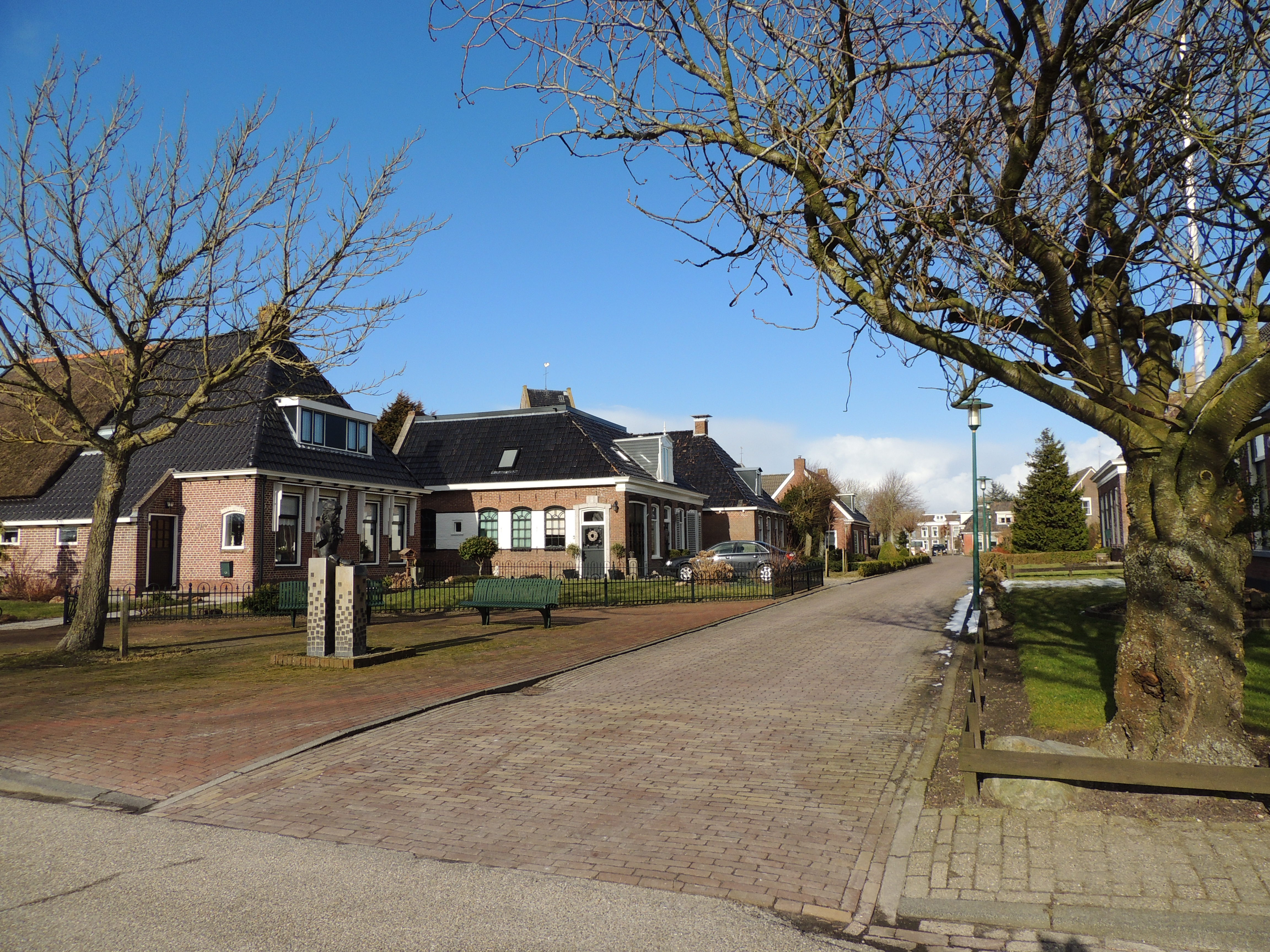
Street view

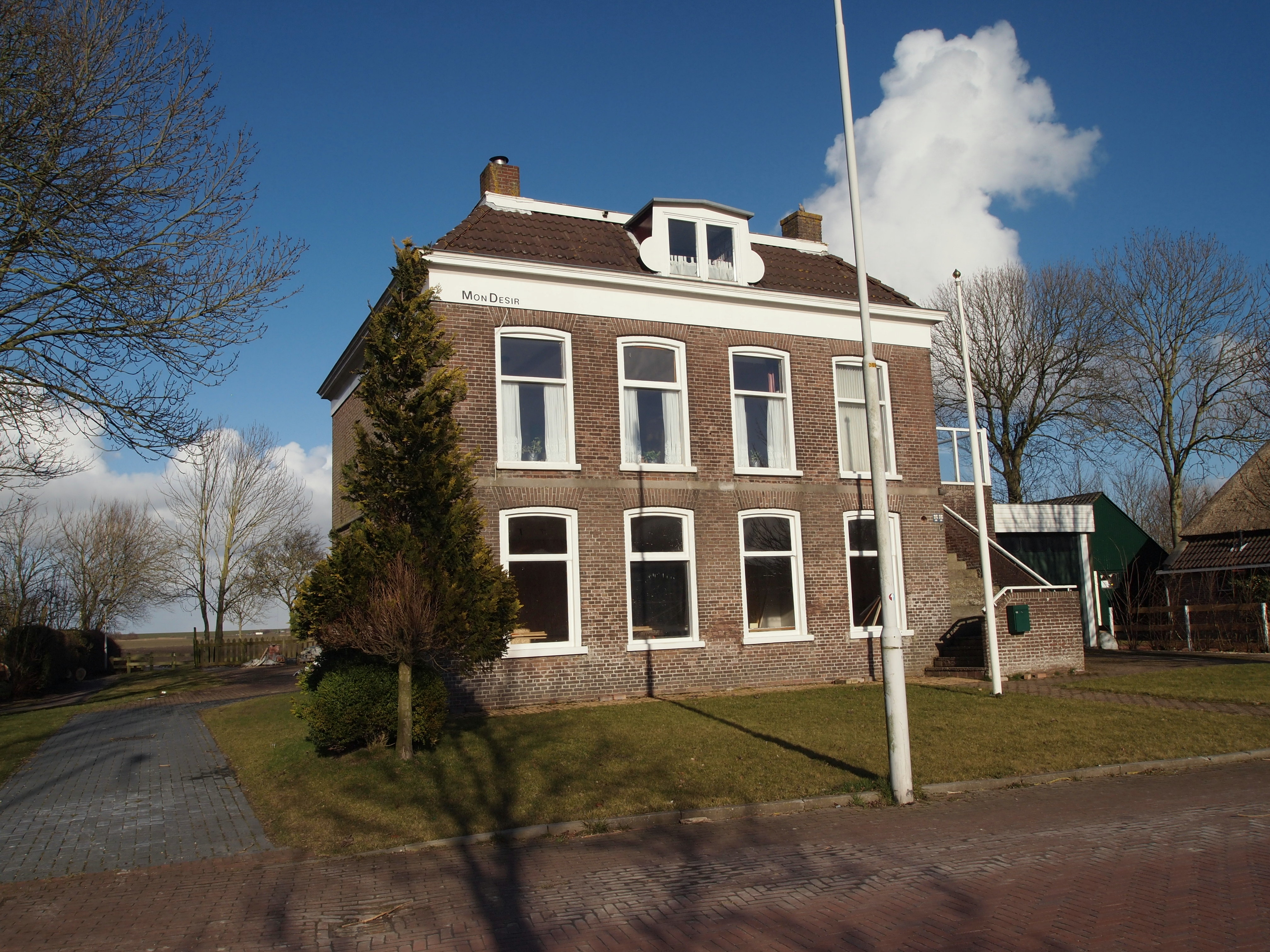
House in Nes

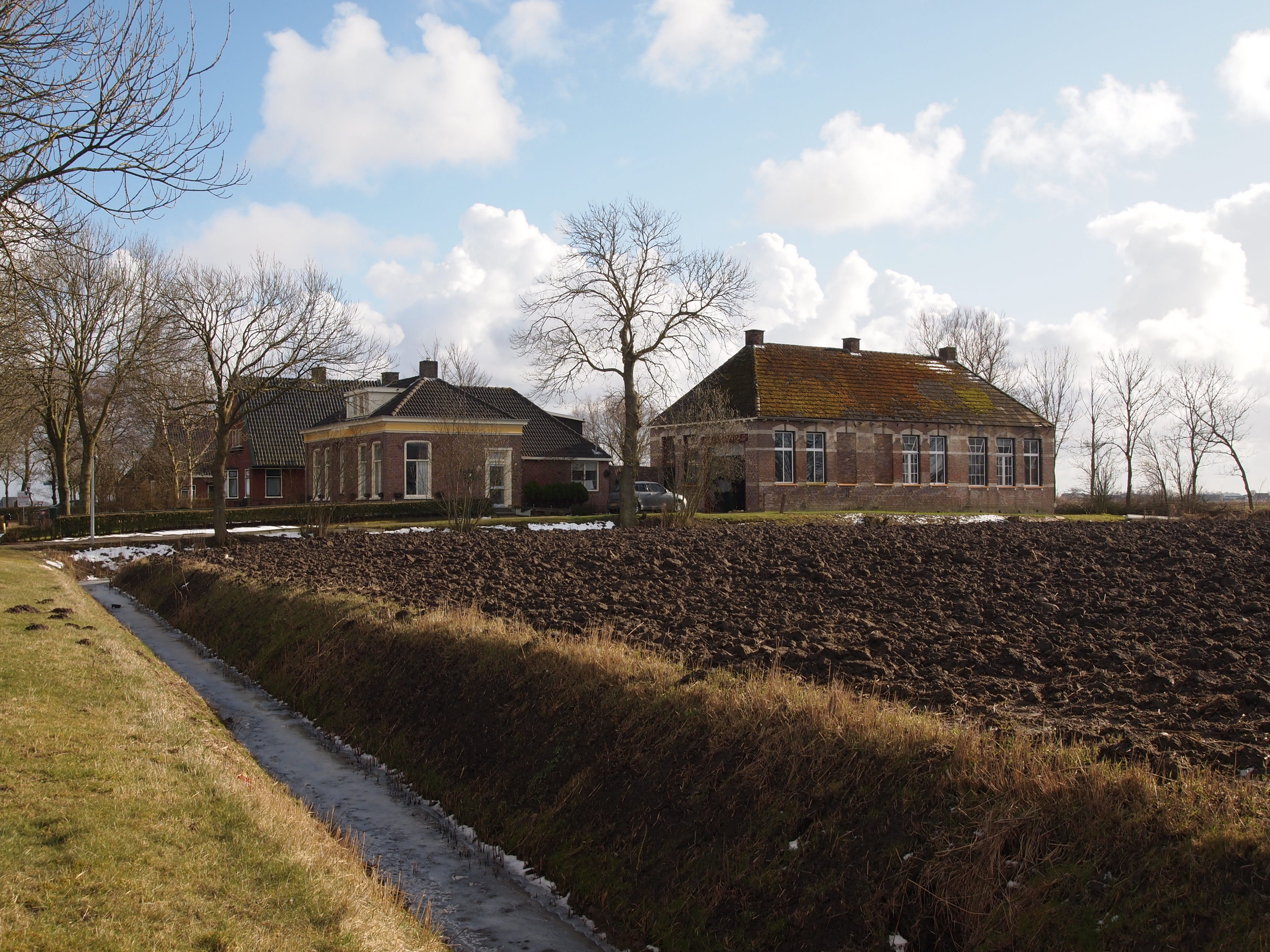
Former school

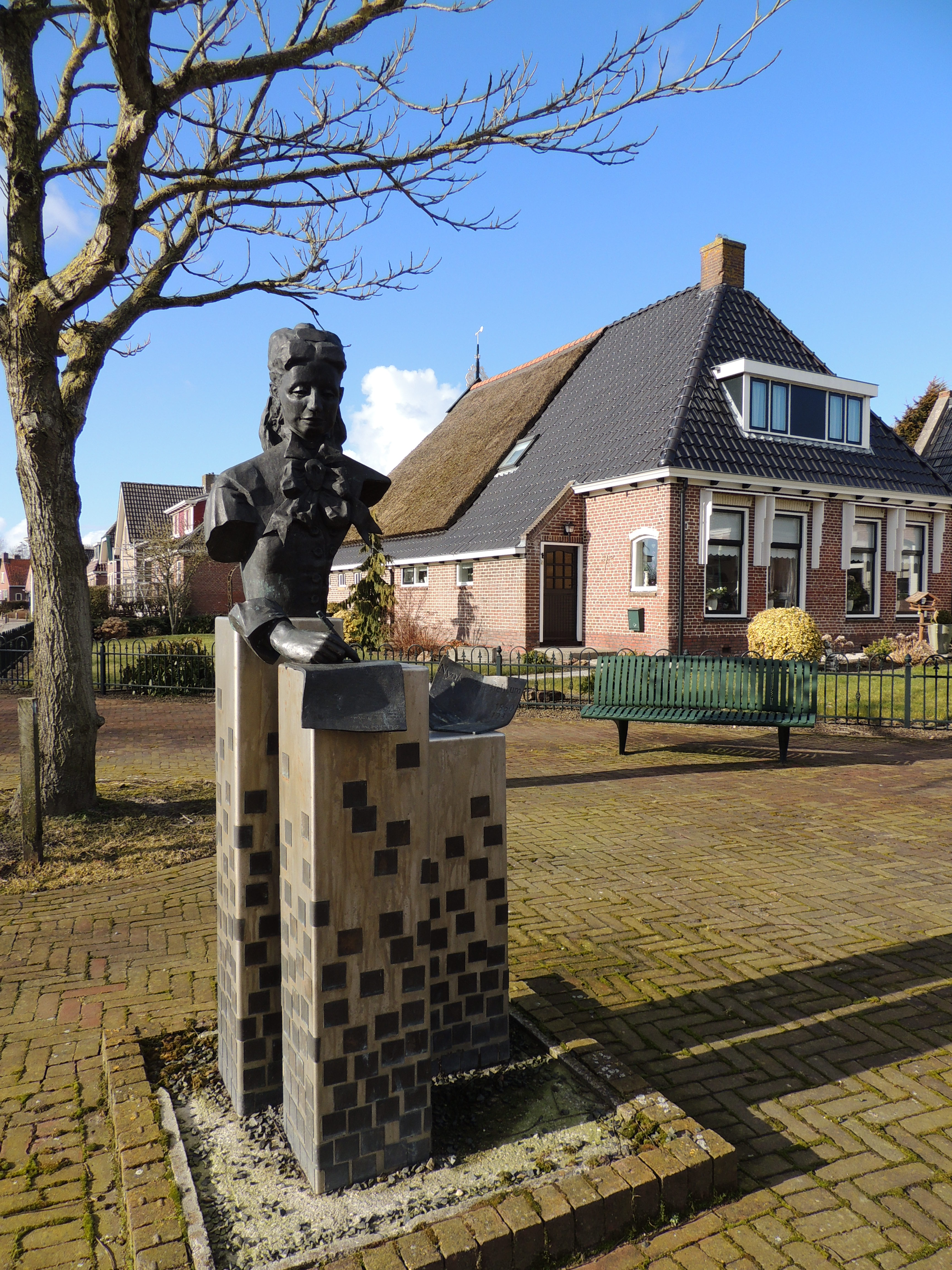
Statue of Nynke van Hichtum
