= One potato, two potato =

Children's counting-out rhyme

- by Traditional
- Language: English
- Genre: Counting-out rhyme

"One potato, two potato" (sometimes "One potato, two potatoes") is a traditional children's counting-out rhyme with accompanying hand actions. It has a Roud number of 19230.

== Text ==
The rhyme has been recorded in a large number of variants, but often consists of or starts with these lines:

One potato, two potato, three potato, four
Five potato, six potato, seven potato, more.

The Dictionary of English Folklore (2000) lists the rhyme as "common all over Britain, USA, Canada and Australia". Its origins are unknown, but there seems to be no record earlier than 1885, when it was noted in Nova Scotia, Canada.

== Variants ==
There are many recorded variants of the rhyme, some of which prefer the plural "One potato, two potatoes", and others which substitute "spud", "tate" or "apple" for "potato". One collected variant ends "[...] seven potato, raw". Multiple continuations also exist, including "[...] Eight potato, nine potato, ten potato all / One, two, three, four, five, six, seven, eight, nine, ten" and "One bad spud!" (collected by Steve Roud).

== Actions ==
In one version, on the command "spuds up!" the children to be counted out extend clenched fists. One child recites the rhyme while using their own fist to tap each of the others in turn. The child whose fist is tapped on the final word "more" puts that fist behind their back. The whole process is repeated several times until only one fist remains. That child then becomes "it". The rhyme can also be used to accompany a variety of actions, including skipping.

Fist counting with similar actions has also been associated with other, quite different, rhymes, both in the UK and in other European countries.

== Developments ==
The popularity of particular counting-out rhyme wordings has varied over the years. In 1969 Iona and Peter Opie found "One potato, two potato" to be "in constant use" both in the UK and the USA during the 20th century but by 2010, although still very well known, Steve Roud found that it was no longer British children's first choice for counting out.

One 2010 report stated that the wording had been surpassed in popularity by similar games such as "Coca Cola", a development in which children recite "Coca Cola / Pepsi Cola / Coca Cola / Split." The action for "Coca Cola" is a lengthened version of that for "One potato, two potato". Each participant initially holds out their hands clasped together, with fingers intertwined. When the counter's fist taps them on the final word "Split", the hands are separated into individual clenched fists and play continues as before.

== Recording ==
In 1964 The Dovells recorded "One Potato – Two Potato – Three Potato – Four", an extended nonsense riff on the rhyme.
