= Jelle Troelstra =

Dutch painter

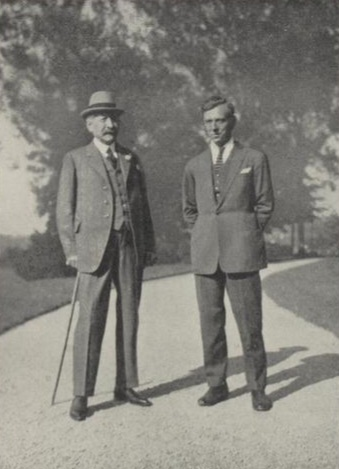
- Jelle Troelstra (right) with his father Pieter Jelles Troelstra
- Born: 17 August 1891; Leeuwarden, Netherlands
- Died: 16 January 1979 (aged 87); Amersfoort, Netherlands
- Occupation: Painter
- Parents: Pieter Jelles Troelstra (father); Sjoukje Bokma de Boer (mother)

Jelle Troelstra (17 January 1891 – 16 January 1979) was a Dutch painter. His work was part of the painting event in the art competition at the 1928 Summer Olympics. Troelstra's work was included in the 1939 exhibition and sale Onze Kunst van Heden (Our Art of Today) at the Rijksmuseum in Amsterdam.
