= Merethe Nergaard =

Norwegian diplomat

Merethe Nergaard (born October 31, 1956), a Norwegian diplomat since 1984, was deputy director of the Ministry of Foreign Affairs (1997–1999), ambassador to Mexico from 2013 to 2017, and ambassador to Morocco from 2017.
