= Leiv Nergaard =

Norwegian businessman

Leiv L. Nergaard (born 17 October 1944) is a Norwegian businessperson, and since 2000, Chairman of Storebrand.

== Biography ==
Nergård is educated with a siviløkonom degree from the Norwegian School of Economics and Business Administration. He started working for Norsk Hydro in 1969, and had several positions in the aluminum division, until he in 1980-84 became director of Notodden Fabrikker. After that he had several executive positions in Hydro, including CFO 1991-2002. He was board member of Confederation of Norwegian Enterprise 1995-2002, and has sat on the board of Storebrand and Rieber & Søn since 1997. He was for many years after 2000 also Chairman of Rieber & Søn.
