= Henry Carrington Bolton =

American chemist and bibliographer of science (1843–1903)

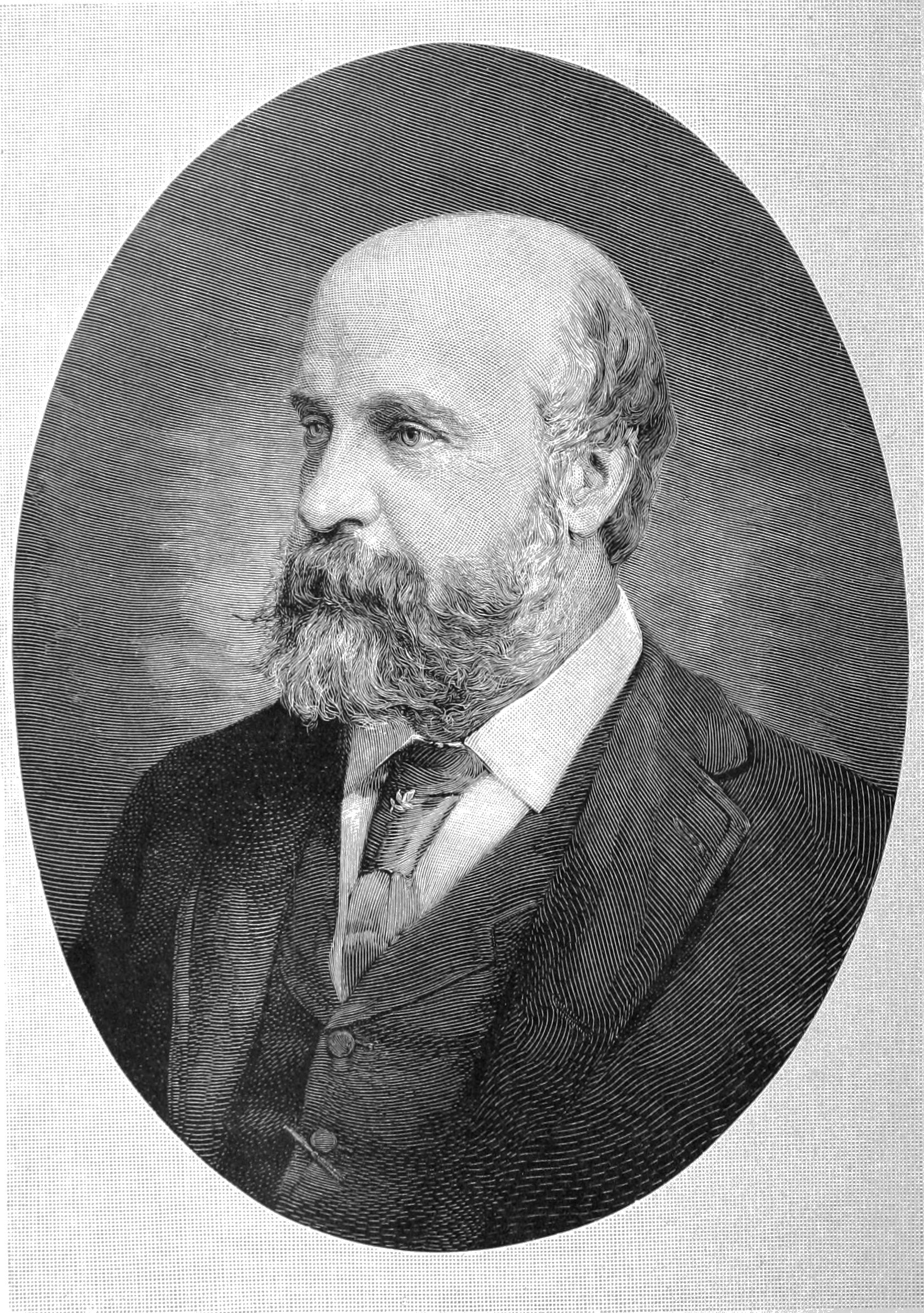
- Born: 29 January 1843; New York City
- Died: November 19, 1903 (aged 60)

Academic work
- Main interests: Chemistry; Scientific bibliography
- Notable works: Catalogue of Scientific and Technical Periodicals, 1665-1895

Henry Carrington Bolton (1843–1903) was an American chemist and bibliographer of science.

== Biography ==
He graduated from Columbia in 1862, and then studied chemistry with Jean Baptiste André Dumas and Charles Adolphe Wurtz in Paris; with Robert Bunsen, Hermann Kopp, and Gustav Kirchhoff at Heidelberg; with Friedrich Wöhler at Göttingen; and with August Wilhelm von Hofmann in Berlin, and received a D. Phil. at Göttingen in 1866, for his work called "On the Fluorine Compounds of Uranium".

After his graduation, he spent some years in travel. From 1872 until 1877, he was assistant in quantitative analysis in the Columbia School of Mines. In 1874 he was appointed professor of chemistry in the Woman's Medical College of the New York Infirmary. He resigned in 1877, when he became professor of chemistry and natural science in Trinity College. The celebration of the centennial of chemistry at Northumberland, Pennsylvania, the home of Joseph Priestley, who discovered oxygen in 1774, was suggested and brought about by Bolton.

Among his investigations, that of the action of organic acids on minerals is perhaps the most important, but most of his work was literary, and his private collection of early chemical books was unsurpassed in the United States. Bolton published large bibliographies of chemistry and later of all scientific periodicals which are still used. He included alchemy in the chemistry listings and emphasized the continuity of the transition. He was a member of many scientific societies, perhaps more than any contemporary.

The Science History Institute hosts the Bolton Society, which is named for H.C. Bolton, to support "printed materials devoted to chemistry and related sciences" and to support its Othmer Library of Chemical History.

== Works ==
- Catalog of Scientific and Technical Periodicals (1665–1882). 1885.
- A Catalogue of Scientific and Technical Periodicals, 1665–1895. (second edition) 1897. Washington: Smithsonian Institution. Reprinted 1965 by Johnston Reprint Corporation.
- Bolton, Henry Carrington (1900). Evolution of the Thermometer, 1592-1743 . Easton, Pennsylvania: The Chemical Publishing Company. pp. 66–79.
- Select Bibliography of Chemistry (1492–1892). 1892. (lists 12,031 titles)
- Select Bibliography of Chemistry (1492–1904). (completed posthumously; lists over 14,000 titles)
- The Follies of Science at the Court of Rudolph II. 1904. Milwaukee: Pharmaceutical Review Publishing Company. (Digital edition by the University and State Library Düsseldorf). Internet Archive
- Priestly, Joseph (1892). Bolton, Henry Carrington (ed.). Scientific Correspondence of Joseph Priestley. Philadelphia: Collins Printing House. p. 98. "James Keir Priestley."
- The Counting-Out Rhymes of Children: Their Antiquity, Origin, and Wide 1888
- The family of Bolton in England and America, 1100-1894 a study in genealogy. Embodying the Genealogical and biographical account of the family of Bolton, published in 1862 by Robert Bolton, rewritten and extended to date. 1895. Google Books
