= Yan tan tethera =

Counting system used by British shepherds

Yan Tan Tethera or yan-tan-tethera is a sheep-counting system traditionally used by shepherds in Yorkshire, Northern England, and some other parts of Britain. The words may be derived from numbers in Brythonic Celtic languages such as Cumbric which had died out in most of Northern England possibly as early as the sixth century, but they were commonly used for sheep counting and counting stitches in knitting until the Industrial Revolution, especially in the fells of the Lake District. Though most of these number systems fell out of use by the turn of the 20th century, some are still in use.

== Origin and development ==
Sheep-counting systems ultimately derive from Brythonic Celtic languages, such as Cumbric; Tim Gay writes: “[Sheep-counting systems from all over the British Isles] all compared very closely to 18th-century Cornish and modern Welsh". Given the corrupted form in which they have survived, it is impossible to be sure of their exact origin. The counting systems have changed considerably over time. A particularly common tendency is for certain pairs of adjacent numbers to come to resemble each other by rhyme (notably the words for 1 and 2, 3 and 4, 6 and 7, or 8 and 9). Still, multiples of five tend to be fairly conservative; compare bumfit with Welsh pymtheg, in contrast with standard English fifteen.

== Use in sheep counting ==
Like most Celtic numbering systems, they tend to be vigesimal (based on the number twenty), but they usually lack words to describe quantities larger than twenty; this is not a limitation of either modernised decimal Celtic counting systems or the older ones. To count a large number of sheep, a shepherd would repeatedly count to twenty, placing a mark on the ground, or move a hand to another mark on a shepherd's crook, or drop a pebble into a pocket to represent each score (e.g. 5 score sheep = 100 sheep).

== Knitting ==
Their use is also attested in a "knitting song" known to be sung around the middle of the nineteenth century in Wensleydale, Yorkshire, beginning "yahn, tayhn, tether, mether, mimph".

== Modern usage ==
The counting system has been used for products sold within Northern England and Yorkshire, such as prints, beers, alcoholic sparkling water (hard seltzer in U.S.), and yarns, as well as in artistic works referencing the region, such as Harrison Birtwistle's 1986 opera Yan Tan Tethera.

Jake Thackray's song "Old Molly Metcalfe" from his 1972 album Bantam Cock uses the Swaledale "Yan Tan Tether Mether Pip" as a repeating lyrical theme.

Garth Nix used the counting system to name the seven Grotesques in his novel Grim Tuesday.

Terry Pratchett referenced the counting system in the book The Wee Free Men, the system being used by both Granny Aching and the Nac Mac Feegles.

== Yan or yen ==
The word yan or yen for 'one' in Cumbrian, Northumbrian, and some Yorkshire dialects generally represents a regular development in Northern English in which the Old English long vowel /ɑː/ <ā> was broken into /ie/, /ia/ and so on. This explains the shift to yan and ane from the Old English ān, which is itself derived from the Proto-Germanic *ainaz. Another example of this development is the Northern English word for 'home', hame, which has forms such as hyem, yem and yam all deriving from the Old English hām.

== Systems by region ==
=== Yorkshire and Lancashire ===
Number	Bowland	Rathmell	Nidderdale	Swaledale	Wharfedale	Teesdale	Wensleydale
1	Yain	Aen	Yain	Yan	Yan	Yan	Yain
2	Tain	Taen	Tain	Tan	Tan	Tean	Tain
3	Eddera	Tethera	Eddero	Tether	Tether	Tether	Eddero
4	Peddera	Fethera	Peddero	Mether		Mether	Peddero
5	Pit	Phubs	Pitts	Pip		Pip	Pitts
6	Tayter	Aayther	Tayter	Azer		Lezar	Tayter
7	Layter	Layather	Layter	Sezar		Azar	Later
8	Overa	Quoather	Overo	Akker		Catrah	Overro
9	Covera	Quaather	Covero	Conter		Borna	Coverro
10	Dix	Dugs	Dix	Dick		Dick	Disc
11	Yain-a-dix	Aena dugs	Yaindix	Yanadick		Yan-a-dick	Yain disc
12	Tain-a-dix	Taena dugs	Taindix	Tanadick		Tean-a-dick	Tain disc
13	Eddera-a-dix	Tethera dugs	Edderodix	Tetheradick		Tether-dick	Ederro disc
14	Peddera-a-dix	Fethera dugs	Pedderodix	Metheradick		Mether-dick	Peddero disc
15	Bumfit	Buon	Bumfit	Bumfit		Bumfit	Bumfitt
16	Yain-a-bumfit	Aena buon	Yain-o-Bumfit	Yanabum		Yan-a-bum	Bumfitt yain
17	Tain-a-bumfit	Taena buon	Tain-o-Bumfit	Tanabum		Tean-a-bum	Bumfitt tain
18	Eddera-bumfit	Tethera buon	Eddero-Bumfit	Tetherabum		Tethera-bum	Bumfitt ederro
19	Peddera-a-bumfit	Fethera buon	Peddero-Bumfit	Metherabum		Methera-bum	Bumfitt peddero
20	Jiggit	Gun a gun	Jiggit	Jigget		Jiggit	Jiggit

=== Lincolnshire, Derbyshire and County Durham ===
Number	Derbyshire	Weardale	Tong	Kirkby Lonsdale	Derbyshire Dales	Lincolnshire
1	Yain	Yan	Yan	Yaan	Yan	Yan
2	Tain	Teyan	Tan	Tyaan	Tan	Tan
3	Eddero	Tethera	Tether	Taed'ere	Tethera	Tethera
4	Pederro	Methera	Mether	Mead'ere	Methera	Pethera
5	Pitts	Tic	Pick	Mimp	Pip	Pimp
6	Tayter	Yan-a-tic	Sesan	Haites	Sethera	Sethera
7	Later	Teyan-a-tic	Asel	Saites	Lethera	Lethera
8	Overro	Tethera-tic	Catel	Haoves	Hovera	Hovera
9	Coverro	Methera-tic	Oiner	Daoves	Dovera	Covera
10	Dix	Bub	Dick	Dik	Dick	Dik
11	Yain-dix	Yan-a-bub	Yanadick	Yaan'edik		Yan-a-dik
12	Tain-dix	Teyan-a-bub	Tanadick	Tyaan'edik		Tan-a-dik
13	Eddero-dix	Tethera-bub	Tetheradick	Tead'eredik		Tethera-dik
14	Peddero-dix	Methera-bub	Metheradick	Mead'eredik		Pethera-dik
15	Bumfitt	Tic-a-bub	Bumfit	Boon, buom, buum		Bumfit
16	Yain-o-bumfitt	Yan-tic-a-bub	Yanabum	Yaan'eboon		Yan-a-bumfit
17	Tain-o-bumfitt	Teyan-tic-a-bub	Tanabum	Tyaan'eboon		Tan-a-bumfit
18	Eddero-o-bumfitt	Tethera-tic-a-bub	Tetherabum	Tead'ereboon		Tethera-bumfit
19	Peddero-o-bumfitt	Methera-tic-a-bub	Metherabum	Mead'ereboon		Pethera-bumfit
20	Jiggit	Gigget	Jigget	Buom'fit, buum'fit		Figgot

=== Southwest England ===
Number	South West England (Variations)	West Country Dorset
1	Yahn	Hant
2	Tayn	Tant
3	Tether	Tothery
4	Mether	Forthery
5	Mumph	Fant
6	Hither	Sahny
7	Lither	Dahny
8	Auver	Downy
9	Dauver	Dominy
10	Dic	Dik
11	Yahndic	Haindik
12	Tayndic	Taindik
13	Tetherdic	Totherydik
14	Metherdic	Fotherydik
15	Mumphit	Jiggen
16	Yahna Mumphit	Hain Jiggen
17	Tayna Mumphit	Tain Jiggen
18	Tethera Mumphit	Tother Jiggen
19	Methera Mumphit	Fother Jiggen
20	Jigif	Full Score

=== Cumberland and Westmorland ===
Number	Coniston	Borrowdale	Eskdale	Westmorland
1	Yan	Yan	Yaena	Yan
2	Taen	Tyan	Taena	Tahn
3	Tedderte	Tethera	Teddera	Teddera
4	Medderte	Methera	Meddera	Meddera
5	Pimp	Pimp	Pimp	Pimp
6	Haata	Sethera	Seckera	Settera
7	Slaata	Lethera	Leckera	Lettera
8	Lowra	Hovera	Hofa	Hovera
9	Dowra	Dovera	Lofa	Dovera
10	Dick	Dick	Dec	Dick
11	Yan-a-Dick	Yan-a-Dick		Yan Dick
12	Taen-a-Dick	Tyan-a-Dick		Tahn Dick
13	Tedder-a-Dick	Tethera-Dick		Teddera Dick
14	Medder-a-Dick	Methera-Dick		Meddera Dick
15	Mimph	Bumfit		Bumfit
16	Yan-a-Mimph	Yan-a-bumfit		Yan-a-Bumfit
17	Taen-a-Mimph	Tyan-a-bumfit		Tahn-a Bumfit
18	Tedder-a-Mimph	Tethera Bumfit		Teddera-Bumfit
19	Medder-a-Mimph	Methera Bumfit		Meddera-Bumfit
20	Gigget	Giggot		Jiggot

=== Wilts, Scots, Lakes, Dales and Welsh ===
Number	Wilts	Scots	Lakes	Dales	Welsh
1	Ain	Yan	Auna	Yain	Un
2	Tain	Tyan	Peina	Tain	Dau
3	Tethera	Tethera	Para	Edderoa	Tri
4	Methera	Methera	Peddera	Peddero	Pedwar
5	Mimp	Pimp	Pimp	Pitts	Pump
6	Ayta	Sethera	Ithy	Tayter	Chwech
7	Slayta	Lethera	Mithy	Leter	Saith
8	Laura	Hovera	Owera	Overro	Wyth
9	Dora	Dovera	Lowera	Coverro	Naw
10	Dik	Dik	Dig	Dix	Deg
11	Ain-a-dik	Yanadik	Ain-a-dig	Yain-dix	Un ar ddeg
12	Tain-a-dik	Tyanadik	Pein-a-dig	Tain-dix	Deuddeg
13	Tethera-a-dik	Tetheradik	Para-a-dig	Eddero-dix	Tri ar ddeg
14	Methera-a-dik	Metheradik	Peddaer-a-dig	Pedderp-dix	Pedwar ar ddeg
15	Mit	Bumfitt	Bunfit	Bumfitt	Pymtheg
16	Ain-a-mit	Yanabumfit	Aina-a-bumfit	Yain-o-bumfitt	Un ar bymtheg
17	Tain-a-mit	Tyanabumfitt	Pein-a-bumfit	Tain-o-bumfitt	Dau ar bymtheg
18	Tethera-mit	Tetherabumfitt	Par-a-bunfit	Eddero-bumfitt	Deunaw
19	Gethera-mit	Metherabumfitt	Pedder-a-bumfit	Peddero-bumfitt	Pedwar ar bymtheg
20	Ghet	Giggot	Giggy	Jiggit	Ugain

=== Numerals in Brythonic Celtic languages ===
Number	Ancient British	Old Welsh	Welsh	Cornish (Kemmyn)	Breton
1	*oinos (m + n), *oinā (f)	un	un	unn; onan	unan
2	*dwāu (m), *dwī (f)	dou, (?)	dau, dwy	dew, diw	daou, div
3	*trīs (m), *tisres (f)	tri, (?)	tri, tair	tri, teyr	tri, teir
4	*petwares (m), *petesres (f)	petuar, (?)	pedwar, pedair	peswar, peder	pevar, peder
5	*pempe	pimp	pump	pymp	pemp
6	*swexs	chwech	chwech	hwegh	c'hwec'h
7	*sextan	seith	saith	seyth	seizh
8	*oxtū	wyth	wyth	eth	eizh
9	*nawan	nau	naw	naw	nav
10	*dekan	dec	deg	deg	dek
11	*oinodekan		un ar ddeg	unnek	unnek
12	*dwāudekan		deuddeg	dewdhek	daouzek
13	*trīdekan		tri ar ddeg, tair ar ddeg	trydhek	trizek
14	*petwardekan		pedwar ar ddeg, pedair ar ddeg	peswardhek	pevarzek
15	*pempedekan		pymtheg	pymthek	pemzek
16	*swexsdekan		un ar bymtheg	hwetek	c'hwezek
17	*sextandekan		dau ar bymtheg, dwy ar bymtheg	seytek	seitek
18	*oxtūdekan		deunaw	etek	triwec'h
19	*nawadekam		pedwar ar bymtheg, pedair ar bymtheg	nownsek	naontek
20	*wikantī		ugain	ugens	ugent

== See also ==
- Counting-out game
- Hickory Dickory Dock
- Lace tells
