= Nienke van Hichtum =

Frisian Dutch children's author

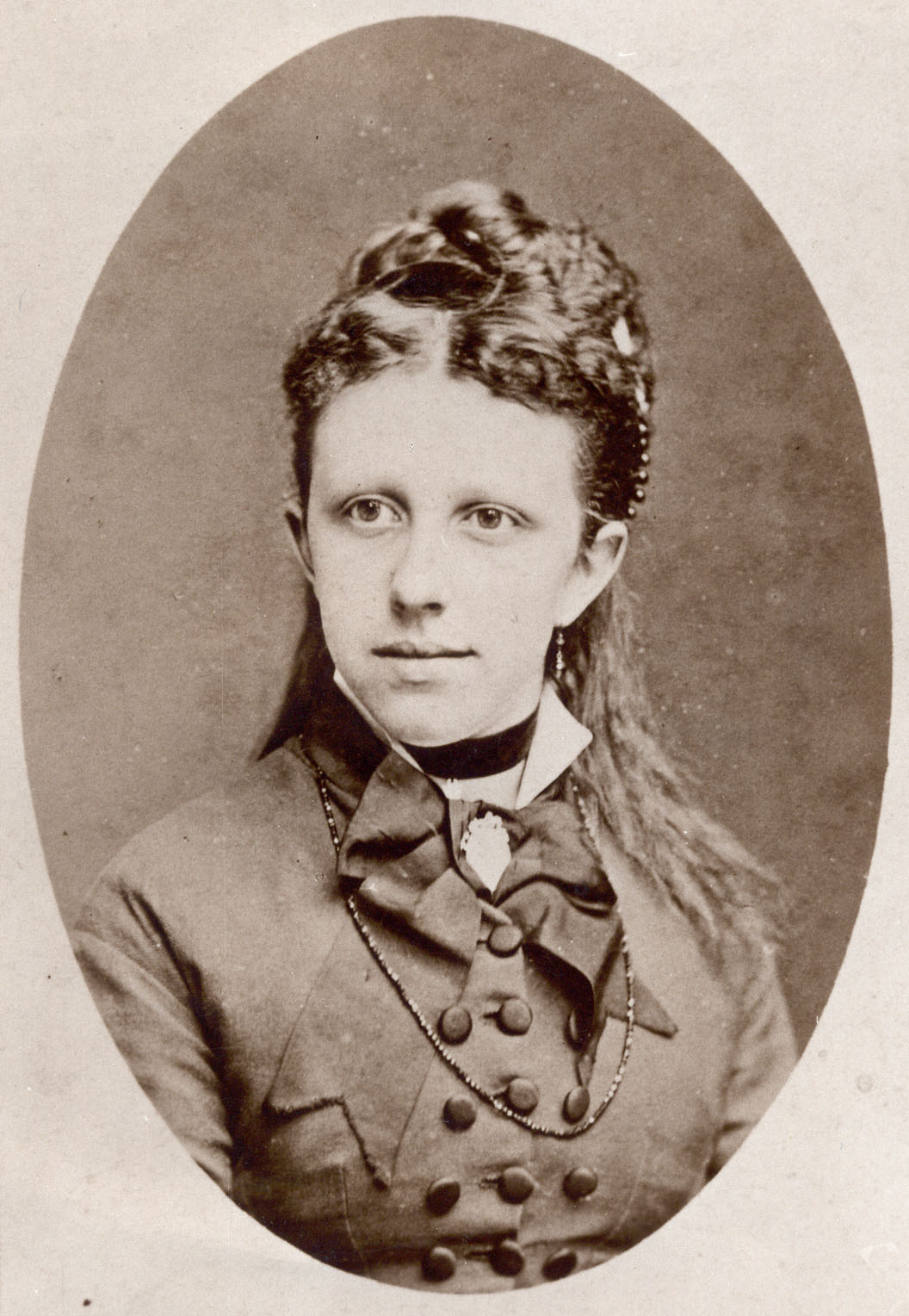
- Born: Sjoukje Maria Diderika Bokma de Boer; 13 February 1860; Nes, Netherlands
- Died: 9 January 1939 (aged 78); Hilversum, Netherlands
- Occupation: Novelist
- Spouse: Pieter Jelles Troelstra (m. 1888; div. 1904)
- Children: Dieuwke Troelstra (1889–1973); Jelle Troelstra (1891–1979)
- Writing career
- Period: 1887–1939
- Genre: Children's literature
- Notable work: Afke's tiental

Sjoukje Maria Diderika Troelstra-Bokma de Boer (née Bokma de Boer; 13 February 1860 – 9 January 1939), better known under her pseudonym Nienke van Hichtum (pronounced [ˈniŋkə vɑn ˈɦɪxtʏm]), was a well-known Frisian Dutch children's author and translator. Van Hichtum wrote books and stories in both West Frisian (her native language) and Dutch.

The biennial Dutch literary award Nienke van Hichtum-prijs is named after her.

In 2001, the film Nynke, a historical drama about her life directed by Pieter Verhoeff, won the Golden Calf for best feature film and actress.

== Early life and education ==
She was born in Nes to Albertus Minderts Bokma de Boer and Dieuwke Jans Klaasesz, the fifth and last daughter of a preacher.

== Personal life ==
From 1888 to 1904, she was married to the socialist leader Pieter Jelles Troelstra. The couple had two children: a daughter, Dieuwke and a son, Jelle. Her son Jelle Troelstra was a painter.

== Bibliography ==
- 1887 – Teltsjes yn skimerjoun
- 1897 – Sip-su, "de knappe jongen" (Sip-su, the handsome boy)
- 1898 – Uit verre landen (From faraway countries)
- 1898 – De geschiedenis van den kleinen Eskimo Kudlago (The history of little Eskimo Kudlago)
- 1899 – Hoe een kleine Kafferjongen page bij de koning werd (How the little kaffir boy became page to the king)
- 1900 – Oehoehoe in de wildernis (Oehoehoe in the wild)
- 1901 – Een Kafferse heldin (A kaffir heroine)
- 1903 – Afke's Tiental (Afke's Ten)
  - 1957 – Reissued as De tsien fan Martens Afke (The ten of Martens Afke)
- 1905 – Friesche schetsen (Frisian sketches)
- 1905 – Het apenboek (The monkeybook)
- 1908 – Der wier ris in âld wyfke
- 1908 – Er was eens een oud vrouwtje (Once upon a time there was an old lady)
- 1911 – Moeders vertellingen (Mother's tales)
- 1911 – Kajakmannen, Groenlandsche avonturen (naverteld)
- 1913 – Oude en nieuwe verhalen (Old and new stories)
- 1918 – De tooverhoed (neiferteld) (The magic hat)
- 1920 – Gouden sprookjes van gebrs. Grimm (naverteld) (Fairytales of gold by the Grimm brothers)
- 1921 – Vertellingen uit de Duizend en één nacht (bewerking) (Tales of 1001 nights)
- 1922 – Het groot vertelselboek (The big book of tales)
- 1923 – Het leven en de wonderbare lotgevallen van Robinson Crusoë (naverteld)
- 1924 – Jetse, een Friesche vertelling (Later uitgebreid tot Jelle van Sipke-Froukjes.)
- 1924 – De verstandige poedel (The wise poodle)
- 1929 – Winnie de Poeh, voor Nederlandse kinderen naverteld door Nienke van Hichtum (Winnie the Pooh, told by Nienke van Hichtum for Dutch children)
- 1930 – De prinses op de erwt (naverteld) (The princess on the pea)
- 1932 – Jelle van Sipke-Froukjes
- 1932 – Oom Remus vertelt sprookjes van de oude plantage aan den kleinen jongen. (bewerking)
- 1933 – Russische sprookjes (Russian fairytales)
- 1936 – Schimmels voor de koets of ... vlooien voor de koekepan?
- 1937 – Drie van de oude plaats (Three of the old place)
  - 1950 – Reissued as Jonge Jaike fan it Aldhiem (Young Jaike of the old home)
- 1937 – Oude bekenden (Old acquaintances)
  - 2003 – Reissued as Alde kunde, in mearkeboek (Old patron, a fairy tale)
- 1939 – Nienke van Hichtum vertelt weer (Nienke van Hichtum tells tales again)
- 1939 – De jonge priiskeatser. Friese versie van Jelle van Sipke-Froukjes. (The young pricecat)
- 1948 – Geplukte bloemetjes, een bundel heel kleine verhaaltjes (Picked flowers, a collection of very tiny tales)
- – Vier duizend kilometer door de Poolwoestijn (Four thousand kilometers through the arctic desert)
- – Sprookjes van Hauff (Hauff's fairytales)
- – Zwarte Jacob van den Valkenburg (Black Jacob van den Valkensburg)
