= Sigurd Nergaard =

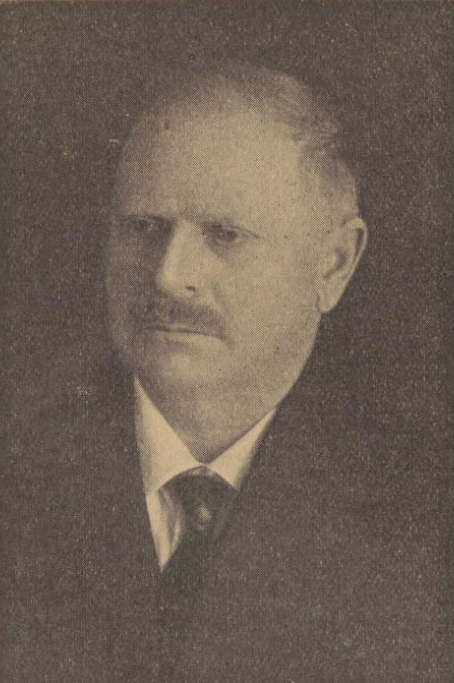
Sigurd Nergaard in 1930

Sigurd Syverson Nergaard (March 28, 1873 – January 21, 1932) was a Norwegian folklorist, writer, school principal, and teacher.

== Life ==
Nergaard was born on March 28, 1873, in Glomstad in Åmot Municipality in Hedmark County, Norway to Syver Pedersen Nergaard (1829–1912) and Valborg Olsdatter Aaset (1835–1924). He graduated from the Hamar Seminary in 1893 and then served as a teacher at various elementary schools in Elverum. In 1899 or 1900 he married Helga Pauline Bækken. In 1922 he was hired as a teacher of Norwegian and history at the Elverum Normal School. From 1927 to 1930 he headed the Norwegian film censorship agency (Norwegian: Statens filmkontroll; now part of the Norwegian Media Authority), and was then appointed school principal at Hamar. He served on the district council, in its presidency, and on the school board and a number of other boards, including Det Norske Samlaget press. He died on January 21, 1932, in Hamar.

== Works ==
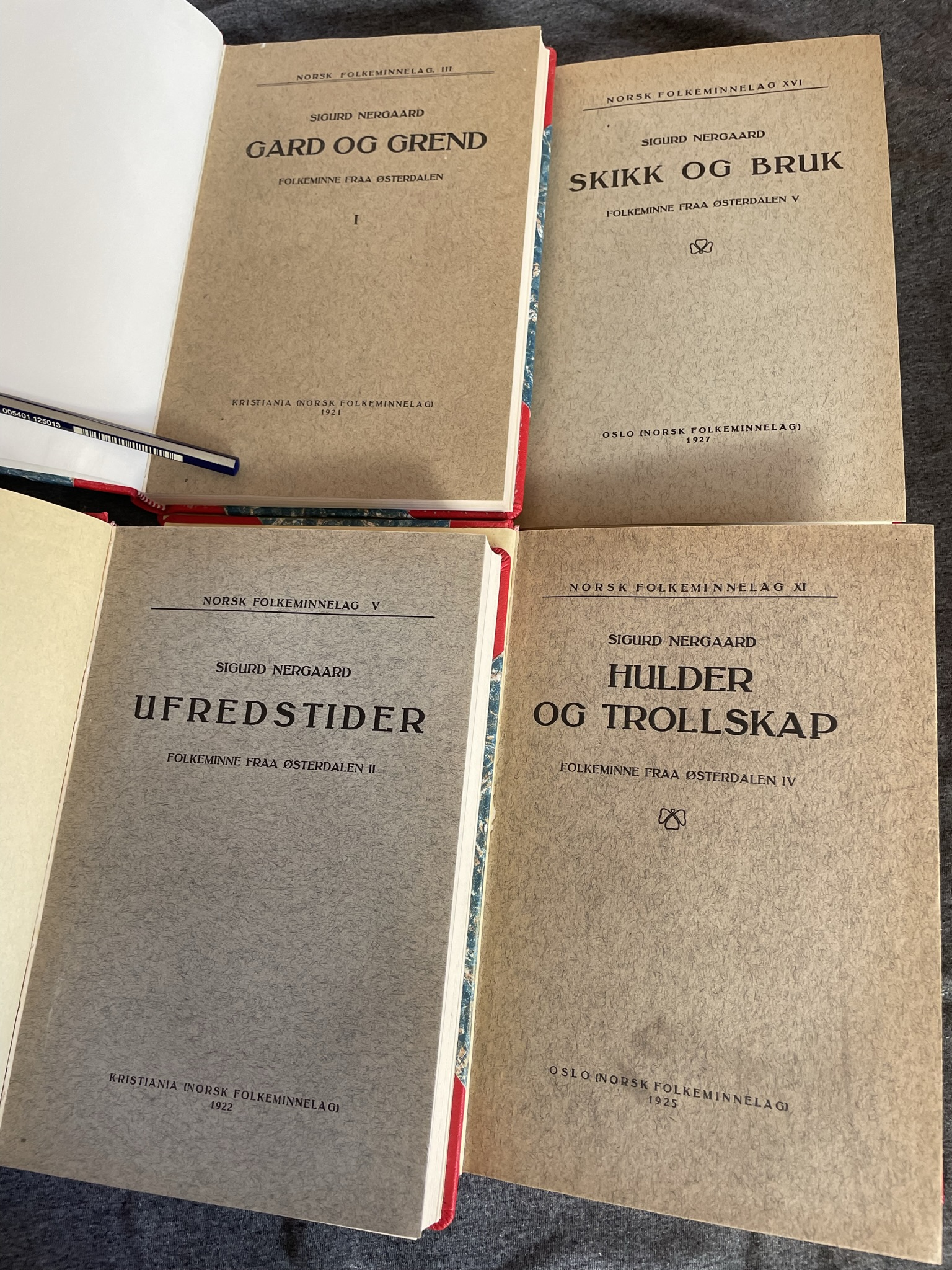
Nergaard's books in the Folkeminne fraa Østerdalen series

Nergaard published six collections of oral folklore material from Østerdalen, five of them as books in the Norwegian Folklore Society series of publications:

- Gard og grend. Folkeminne fraa Østerdalen (Farm and Hamlet: Folklore from Østerdalen; 1921)
- Ufredstider. Folkeminne fraa Østerdalen (Wartime: Folklore from Østerdalen; 1922)
- Eventyr, barnevers, spurningar og ordspraak. Folkeminne fraa Østerdalen (Adventures, Children's Rhymes, and Proverbs: Folklore from Østerdalen; 1923)
- Hulder og trollskap. Folkeminne fraa Østerdalen (Fairies and Witchcraft: Folklore from Østerdalen; 1925)
- Skikk og bruk. Folkeminne fraa Østerdalen (Custom and Practice: Folklore from Østerdalen; 1927)
- "Utsyn over folkeminna i Østerdalen" (Perspectives on Folklore in Østerdalen; in Bygd og bonde 7 (1925): 152–178)

Other publications by Nergaard include:

- Segner fraa Elvrom (Sayings from Elverum; supplement to Syn og Segn, 1907)
- "Hardåret 1812 i Østerdalen" (The Harsh Year of 1812 in Østerdalen; in Bygd og bonde 1 (1919): 134–137)
- "Kristian IV paa Kvikne" (Christian IV at Kvikne; in Bygd og bonde 1 (1919): 63ff.)
- "Utsyn over Trysils historie" (Perspectives on the History of Trysil; in Bygd og bonde 8 (1926): 138–164)
