= James Murrell =

British folk magician (c. 1785–1860)

- Born: c. 1785; Rochford, Essex, England
- Died: 16 December 1860 (aged 74–75); Hadleigh, Essex, England
- Occupations: Cunning man, shoemaker
- Spouse: Elizabeth Button (m.1812–1839)
- Children: Seventeen in total.
- Parent(s): Edward Murrell, Hannah Murrell

James Murrell (c. 1785 – 16 December 1860), also known as Cunning Murrell, was an English cunning man, or professional folk magician, who spent most of his life in the town of Hadleigh in the eastern English county of Essex. In this capacity, he reportedly employed magical means to aid in healing both humans and animals, exorcising malevolent spirits, countering witches, and restoring lost or stolen property to its owner.

Born in Rochford, Essex, Murrell grew up in the area before moving to Southwark in London, where he was married in 1812. He had seventeen children with his wife, and the family later moved back to Essex, settling in Hadleigh, where Murrell gained work as a shoemaker. At some point he also began working as a cunning man, gaining fame for his work in this field on both sides of the Thames Estuary. Describing himself as "the Devil's Master", he cultivated an air of mystery about himself, also experimenting with the creation of iron witch bottles. On a number of occasions his magical activities gained the attention of the local press. Although many residents valued his services and viewed him as a good and benevolent individual, his activities proved controversial and divisive. Many educated figures criticised what they saw as his role in encouraging superstition among the local population; his death certificate recorded his profession as that of a "quack doctor".

Murrell's fame greatly increased after his death when he was made the subject, albeit in a highly fictionalised form, of a 1900 novel by Arthur Morrison. Morrison also produced a more objective study of the cunning man, published in The Strand magazine. During the 1950s, the folklorist Eric Maple conducted further research on Murrell, finding much local folklore still surrounding him in the Hadleigh area, including the allegation that he had the ability to fly and to instantaneously transport himself vast distances. Murrell has continued to attract the attention of historians and folklorists studying English folk magic, and is referenced in works by scholars like Ronald Hutton, Owen Davies, and Ralph Merrifield.

== Life and family ==
James Murrell was likely born in Rochford, Essex in 1785, and then baptised on 9 October 1785 in the St. Mary the Virgin Church in Hawkwell, Essex. His parents were named Edward Murrell and Hannah Murrell, née Dockrell. According to the investigations of the journalist Arthur Morrison, Murrell was the seventh son of a seventh son. After completing school, Murrell entered into an apprenticeship with the surveyor G. Emans, who operated from Burnham, a town to which Murrell's brother Edward had moved. There is evidence that Murrell subsequently moved to London, where he worked as a stillman at a chemist's shop in the 1800s or early 1810s.

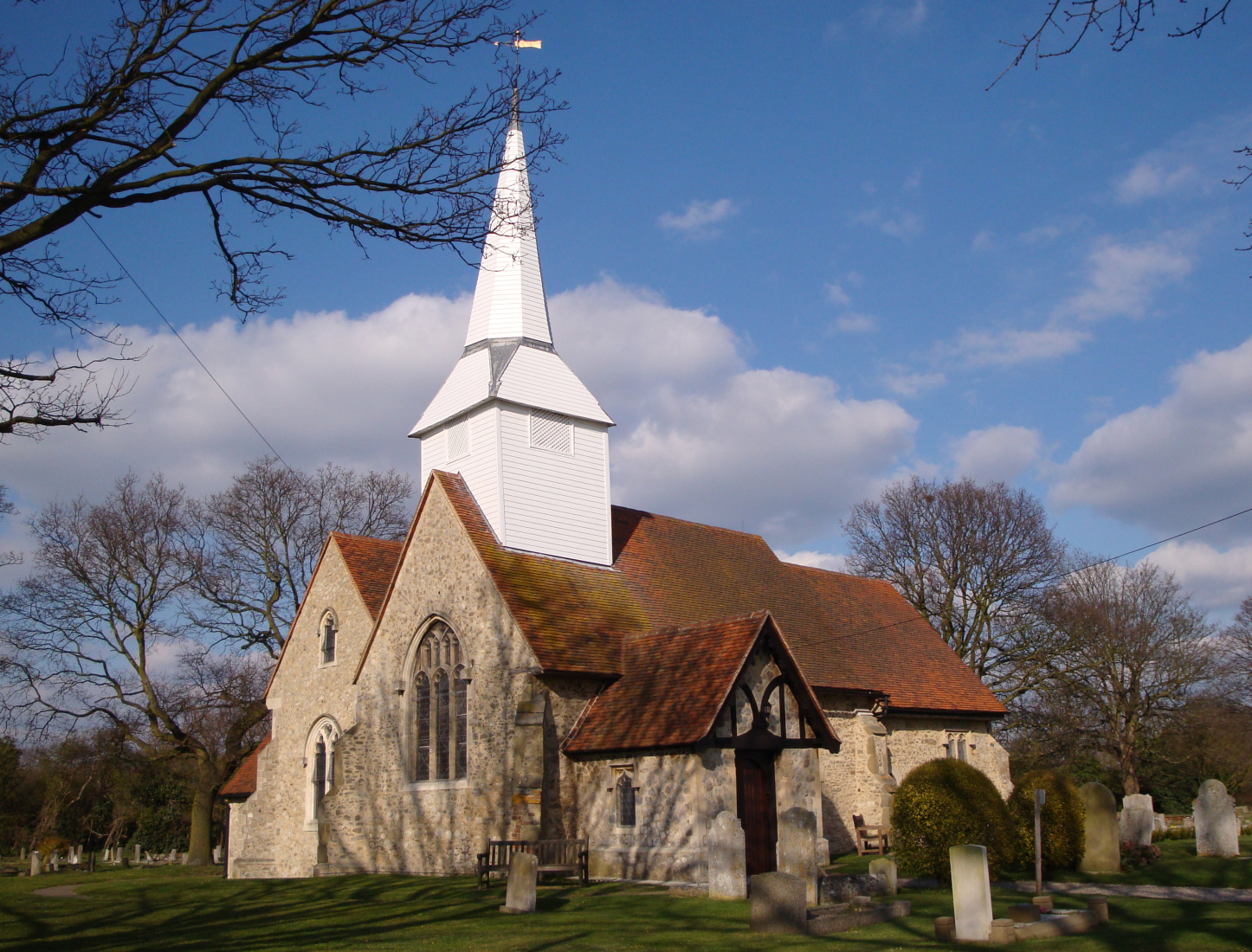
Murrell was baptised in St. Mary's Church, Hawkwell

On 12 August 1812, Murrell married Elizabeth Francis Button at St. Olave's Church, Bermondsey in Southwark. Button was also from Essex, having been baptised in Hadleigh on 5 December 1790. Between 1814 and 1834, there are baptismal and burial records of the couple having seventeen children, many of whom did not survive infancy.

On 26 December 1820, Murrell returned to Essex to attend the wedding of his sister Hannah at Hawkwell's St. Mary the Virgin Church. She and her new husband Daniel Whitwell then proceeded to move to nearby Canewdon, with Murrell visiting them there on a regular basis thereafter. By the early 1840s, one of Murrell's daughters, Louisa, had moved in with the childless Daniel and Hannah.

Elizabeth Murrell died in Hadleigh on 16 April 1839, aged forty-nine. The cause of death was cited as "inflammation of the chest", and her body was buried on 21 April in Hadleigh's St. James the Less Church. In the 1841 national census, Murrell was documented as a shoemaker living in Hadleigh with four of his children (Eliza, Matilda, Edward, and Eleanor). However, in the June 1844 wedding documentation of Eliza, Murrell was listed as a labourer, and on the October 1844 marriage documentation of Matilda, he was listed as a herb doctor. By the 1851 national census, he again specified his profession as that of a shoemaker, and recorded that he was living in Hadleigh with his children Edward, Eleanor, and Louisa, as well as with his grandson William Spendle.

No images of Murrell survive. Accounts describe him as a short man who walked with his hands behind his back and hummed as he went. He was also noted for wearing a hard hat, bobbed tail coat, and iron goggles, while carrying a whalebone umbrella and a basket into which he placed the herbs that he collected. His appearance reportedly scared local children, of whom he was nevertheless fond.

== Cunning career ==
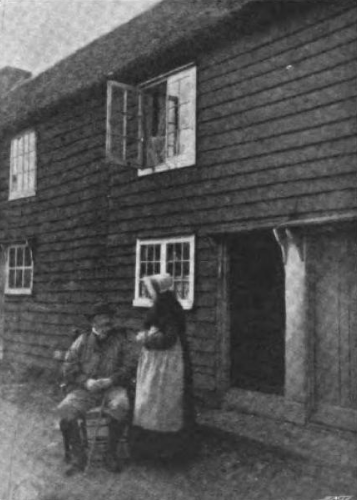
A late 19th-century photograph of Murrell's house. According to Morrison, the house "was an ordinary, clap-boarded two-floored little cottage, one of a row of half-a-dozen or so". Situated in a narrow lane facing Hadleigh Church, it had been demolished by the 1960s. (please note the image is 'mirrored'

In south-east Essex, Murrell was known as "The Devil's Master", a title that he himself used as a self-description. He cultivated an air of mystery about himself by keeping himself largely apart from wider community life, speaking seldom, and traveling largely at night. His house was locally known as a "place to avoid" and those visiting him reportedly often waited for some time outside, plucking up the courage to enter. Within the cottage, Murrell had drying herbs hanging from his ceiling, and his devices were reported to include a crystal, a mirror, and a bowl of water. Other items that Murrell used in his magical practices were a copper charm with which he would allegedly distinguish whether an individual was lying or not, and a "trick" telescope that supposedly enabled him "to see through brick walls". The latter device was examined by an acquaintance of Murrell's, who deemed it to be "a clumsily home-made arrangement of bits of looking-glass, such as might once have been bought at a toy-shop". Murrell possessed a library of books, including works on astrology and astronomy, conjuration, and medical texts. He also wrote a number of personal notebooks containing information on such topics, the last of which survived into at least the 1950s.

Murrell claimed that he could exorcise malevolent spirits, destroy witches, and restore lost or stolen property to its owner, as well as providing services as an astrologer, herbalist, and animal healer. He charged a halfpenny for curing warts, and two shillings and six pence for breaking a witch's spell. He was reputed to cure sick animals by passing his hands over their affected area, muttering a prayer, and then hanging an amulet about their neck, and was requested to use these powers at farms in Essex, Suffolk, and northern Kent. During his lifetime, Murrell was known on both sides of the Thames Estuary, although not apparently beyond that. He did however receive postal correspondence from a range of places, including from Essex girls who were working as maids in London.

Murrell used witch bottles as part of his magical practices, and, during the 1950s, the folklorist Eric Maple encountered claims that Murrell was able to summon anyone he wished using them, including individuals who had gone overseas. Murrell experimented with the use of a witch bottle constructed out of iron; he had two such devices created by a local smith, Stephen Choppen, and had the plug at the mouth soldered up before the bottle was placed in a fire as part of an anti-bewitchment spell. The idea behind this was that the bottle itself would not explode under the heat, and that thus it could be reused on other occasions. According to folklore collected by Maple, the smith's attempts, which were initially unsuccessful, succeeded only after Murrell had recited a charm.

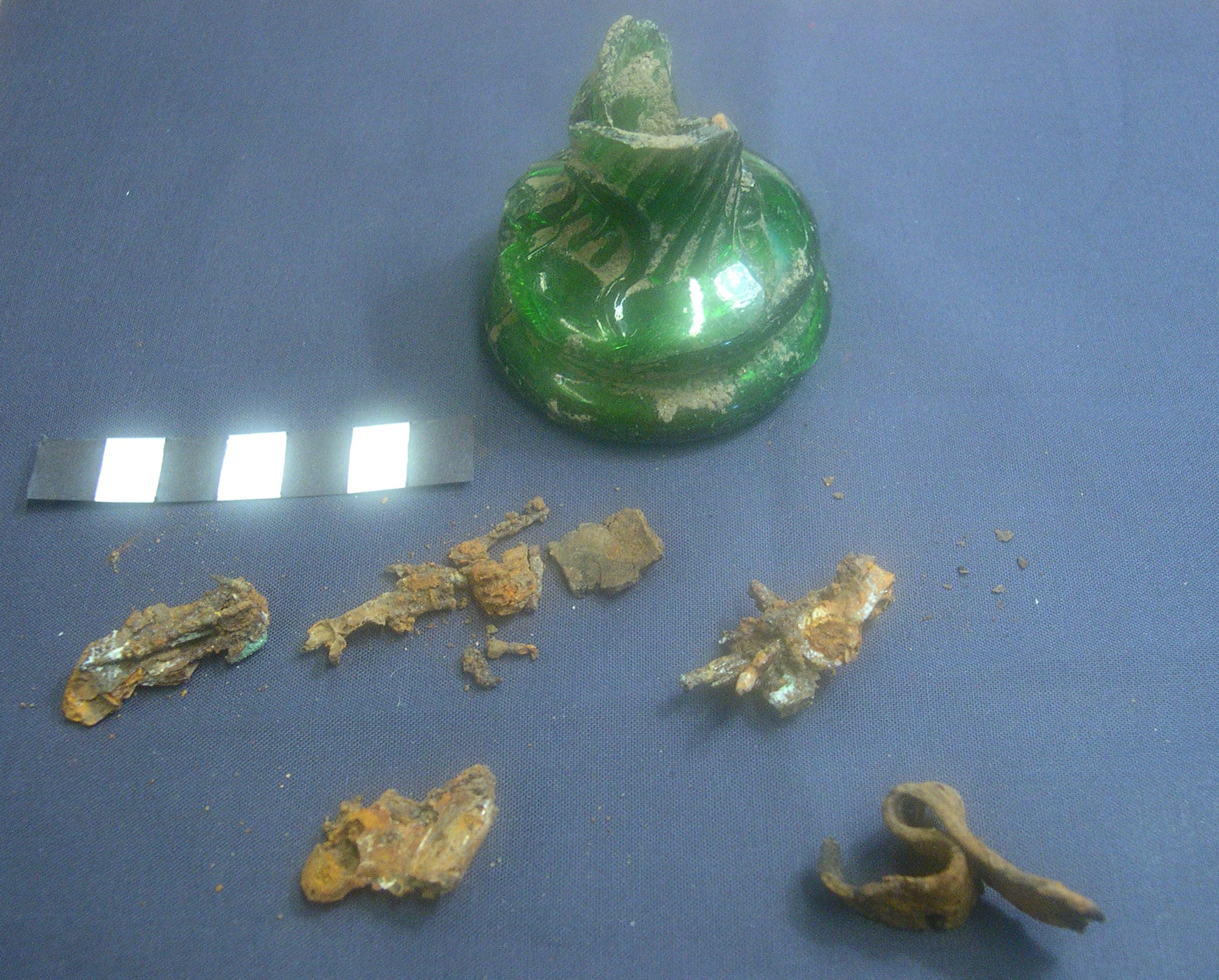
Murrell made use of witch bottles (example pictured)

According to Maple's research, various accounts of Murrell's astrological activities continued to be told in the community after the latter's death. One held that he was able to predict the death of a man to the "very day and hour" while another was that he also predicted the time of his own death to the very minute. It was claimed that on one occasion he was asked to provide the horoscope of a newborn child, but that he refused, stating that "Make the most of the child, you will not have it for long", after which the child soon died, while when an old lady asked him to predict the future for her, he refused to do so for more than nine years ahead, with her dying in the eighth.

Morrison found that the locals whom he spoke to – many of whom remembered Murrell from several decades before – found the cunning man to be "a white and lawful wizard, who warred against the powers of darkness with all his might"; they added that it was "no sin to employ the arts of a man like him". Conversely, Maple noted that his research indicated that attitudes toward Murrell varied within the local community. Although many individuals, particularly among the poor, viewed him as a valuable member of the community, others – particularly among the wealthier strata of society – deemed him to be "a dangerous quack and disseminator of superstitious nonsense". Maple found one woman, Mrs Petchey, who described him as "a smuggler and a bad man. He did things that wouldn't be allowed today - them witchcrafts, I mean. Nowadays, people would say he'd sold his soul to the Devil, wouldn't they? They'd put him away for his witchcrafts." Conversely, Maple noted that Mrs Murrell, who was a descendant of James, described the cunning man as "a good man and a regular churchgoer". According to the folklore obtained by Maple, Murrell would often have debates about Christian theology with a local parson, the Reverend Thomas Espin – who had been Professor of Pastoral Theology at Queen's College, Birmingham – and that Espin expressed the view that Murrell "knows his Bible better than I do... He is either a very good man or a very bad one, and I can't make up my mind which."

=== Documented cases ===
"A young woman found an old gypsy hiding in a barn and ordered her out. She was a witch, and she cursed the girl who presently began to scream like a cat and bark like a dog. Murrell was called in. He placed in the fire a bottle containing hair and nail-clippings from the victim. He told everyone to keep absolutely silent while they awaited the arrival of the witch. Presently there came a hammering on the door, and a woman's voice begged him to stop 'the test', as the fire was causing her agony. The bottle burst. On the following morning, an old woman was found burned to death outside the Woodcutters' Arms, three miles away. It was the gypsy. The girl recovered."

— Account recorded from Mrs Watson, whose grandmother was a neighbour of Murrell's, by Maple.

Several accounts about Murrell's activities have been preserved, either because they were reported on by the regional press or because they were passed down in oral tradition. One example focused around a rumour that had spread in nearby Canewdon which claimed that two prominent local women were malevolent witches. One of these individuals was Mary Ann Atkinson, the wife of the Reverend William Atkinson, the vicar of Canewdon. The other was Eliza Lodwick, a widow who took control of the 500 acre Lambourne Hall following the death of her husband in 1826; on two separate occasions labourers were convicted of stealing from her, while another died accidentally on her property. Locals concerned that these women were witches approached the vicar with their beliefs, but he dismissed them. They subsequently turned to Murrell, asking for his aid in exposing the women as witches. According to claims made in the 1950s by the-then 94-year-old local man Arthur Downes, the Canewdon villagers believed that Murrell could force all of the witches to assemble and dance about the churchyard against their will by whistling. However, the vicar intervened, with locals believing that he was doing so to protect his wife. The vicar himself died in March 1847.

In April 1849, the Ipswich Express and Lloyd's Weekly Newspaper reported on a case in a village near to Rayleigh in which a girl had been afflicted with fits. Her family believed that a witch was to blame, with Murrell being called in to free her of the perceived bewitchment. He commissioned the local blacksmith to create an iron witch bottle, into which he placed toe-nail clippings and locks of hair belonging to the putative victim. The bottle was then placed into the hearth and heated until it exploded, with this supposedly defeating the witch's machinations.

"Superstition it seems, is as powerful now as when ghosts walked the earth, and witches were weighed against the Church Bible. We are, says a correspondent, quite equal to the people in the days of old; for we have our magicians, necromancers, and such like, to bring the hidden things to light. There is an old man named Murrells, a sort of quack doctor and herbalist living at Hadleigh, who has been practicing the magician for years, and in some cases successfully; and many persons are in the habit of going to him for advice and assistance[...] Of course the little old man in knee breeches and gaiters, and an old coat, is looked upon in the neighbourhood as more potent than a whole troop of policemen."

— Chelmsford Chronicle, 1857.

In February 1857 the Chelmsford Chronicle reported that £10 in silver had been stolen from Golding Spearman, keeper of the Tilbury Fort canteen. When the police were unable to identify the culprit, Spearman turned to Murrell, who asserted that he would place a spell on the thief which would result in the return of the money. Shortly after, a soldier discovered the stolen money and returned it to Spearman, who attributed its retrieval to Murrell.

In September 1858, the Brazier family accused Mrs Mole, a labourer's wife who lived in East Thorpe, Essex, of bewitching their daughter and livestock. Hoping to have the bewitchment removed, they consulted a local cunning-man known as Burrell, who lived at nearby Copford. When Burrell was unable to help, they proceeded to consult Murrell, inviting him to come to East Thorpe to remove the curse. Murrell's planned visit generated much anticipation in East Thorpe's community, with the local rector attempting to calm the situation by requesting that the parish relieving officer move the allegedly bewitched girl to the union-house, where she could be examined by the parish surgeon. Nevertheless, the officer of the poor refused to comply, asserting that Murrell's arrival would correct the problem. Persisting, the rector applied to the local magistrate to ensure that police would be in the village on the day of Murrell's arrival, to ensure that the crowd would be controlled. On the day itself, a crowd of two hundred had gathered, and proceeded to Mrs Mole's house with the intention of carrying out folk justice; concerned by this illegal behaviour, the rector stood outside of her door and forbade the crowd entry, prior to police arriving and dispersing the mob.

On 9 November 1858, the Bury and Norwich Post recorded that earlier that month, a waistcoat, silk handkerchief, and £3 in gold were stolen from a labourer, Richard Butcher, who lived in Stanford-le-Hope. Butcher had gone to Murrell, asking him to use his skills to locate and retrieve his stolen property; when Murrell failed to do so, Butcher turned to the police to apprehend the culprit. Other accounts were passed down in local folk accounts; Maple interviewed an eighty-six-year-old Mrs Petchey, who stated that "My mother lost a brooch, and Murrell told her who had stolen it. It was her own sister-in-law. He wouldn't tell her, though, unless she promised not to tell anyone. The brooch was back in its old place a few days later."

== Death ==
Local records indicate that Murrell died in Hadleigh on 16 December 1860. On his death certificate, his profession was listed as "Quack Doctor", and his cause of death was attributed to "natural causes". On 23 December his body was inhumed into the eastern side of the churchyard at the Church of St James the Less, near to where many of his deceased children had been buried. It was not marked by any tombstone.

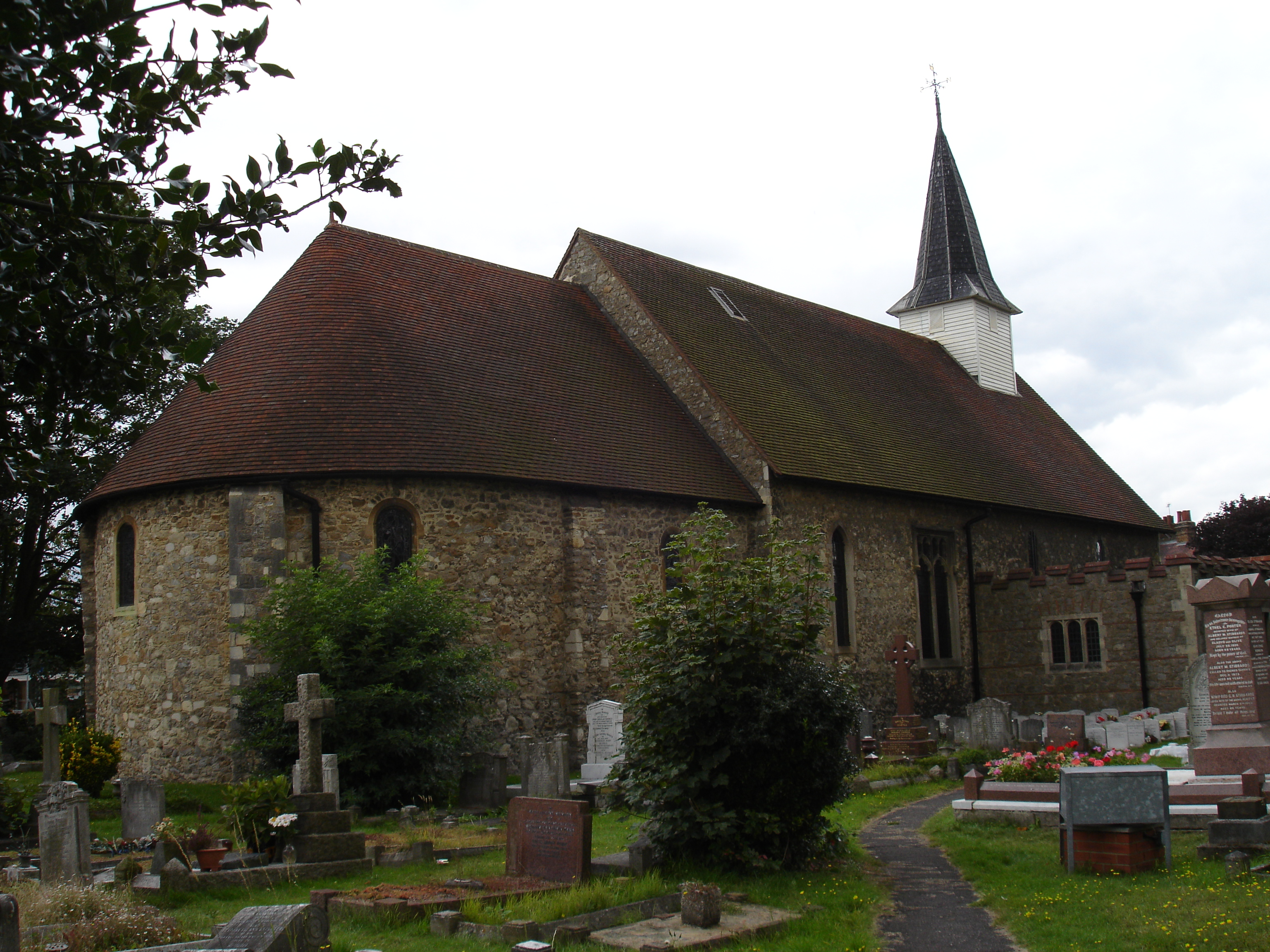
Murrell was buried in the churchyard of St James the Less Church, Hadleigh

His son later told Morrison that the cunning man had informed his own daughter of the exact time and date at which he would die prior to it actually happening. Another story reports that Murrell took to his death bed aware of his oncoming demise, informing his daughter to turn away the curate "For I be the devil's master as be well knowed. Clergymen den't bother me in the oad time, they shan't now [sic]". Conversely, Maple recorded a story that in his final hours, Murrell was visited by the local curate; Murrell was frustrated by the latter's attempts to administer religious consolation and eventually scared him off by shouting out "I am the Devil's master".

An alternate story spread that Murrell had been killed by a witch-bottle that had been placed into a fire by an aggrieved local man who believed that Murrell had bewitched his donkey and thus caused its death. The archaeologist Ralph Merrifield concluded that this tale was "probably entirely apocryphal". Another story given by Choppen was that Murrell's son Edward – or "Buck" as he was nicknamed – had taken the cunning man's final witch-bottle. Placing the bottle in his household fire, it was there that the bottle exploded and destroyed a wall of Buck's cottage.

Murrell left no will. His son Edward later claimed that Murrell's landlord soon buried a wooden chest with the old man's papers in the garden of the cottage, deeming their associations with magic to be dangerous. Edward claimed that he subsequently dug the chest up again. Murrell's personal effects were treated as souvenirs, and several were treated as though they retained magical and supernatural associations for many years after his death. Murrell's "trick" telescope was sold by his son for half-a-guinea; the purchaser was allegedly found dead shortly after with half-a-guinea lodged in his throat, resulting in claims that the telescope itself brought bad luck onto anyone who possessed it. In 1960, Maple commented that Murrell's whalebone umbrella had been owned by a local undertaker until fairly recently, while he also noted that Murrell's carved chest was in the possession of a woman who lived at Southend-on-Sea.

== Legacy ==
Maple ultimately described Murrell as "the greatest and certainly the most influential of all the Cunning Men of the Essex marshlands", and elsewhere he termed him "perhaps the last of the great Cunning Men", noting that upon his death Murrell "became part of the great heritage of English witch mythology". Having studied the cunning man's legacy during the late 1950s, Maple believed that Murrell "succeeded in agitating the old fear of witchcraft into something like a mania" among the local community, and that "in doing so he unwittingly preserved the old traditions and folktales for a generation beyond their normal span, and in this respect folklorists are in his debt". The historian Ronald Hutton has characterised Murrell as the "most celebrated cunning man in the whole of nineteenth-century southern England".

=== Local folklore ===
Murrell continued to remain the subject of local discussion after his death. Maple believed that the legacy created within these communities was a combination of both fact and myth, with "Murrell the man" being supplanted by "Murrell the myth", around which a "vast wealth of lore" accrued. Maple noted that many of the attributes associated with witches in British folklore came to be associated with the cunning man. For instance, he highlighted the existence of local stories that credited Murrell with the ability to fly, and that he was once observed flying over the River Crouch on a broomstick. Another story held that Murrell had been talking to a group of old men in Canvey Island before suddenly vanishing and reappearing in his own village, which was several miles away.

One young boy reported having observed the ghost of Murrell collecting herbs at some point after this death; he passed this story on to his daughter, who told it to Maple. Hadleigh also had other ghost lore traditions, surrounding figures known as the White Lady and the Black Man, the latter being a prince and the former a woman who would allegedly invite passers by to join her in a waltz through the ruins of Hadleigh Castle.

In a 2014 article published in the British occult magazine The Cauldron, Richard Ward suggested that the folk stories surrounding Murrell were later transposed to another local figure, George Pickingill of Canewdon, who would also come to be regarded as a cunning man in local folklore by the 1950s. He noted in particular that Pickingill was accredited with the ability to command the witches of Canewdon to reveal themselves, a trait that Downes had previously attributed to Murrell. Hutton accepted this as a possibility yet lamented that the claim seemed to be "incapable of solid proof".

In 2011, Robert Hallman, a local Hadleigh resident, suggested that the community should memorialise Murrell in some way, either by naming a local street after him or erecting a statue in the centre of the town.

=== Investigations ===
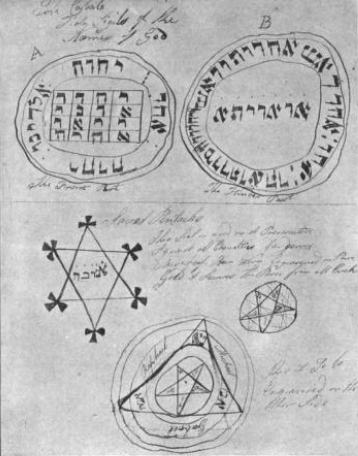
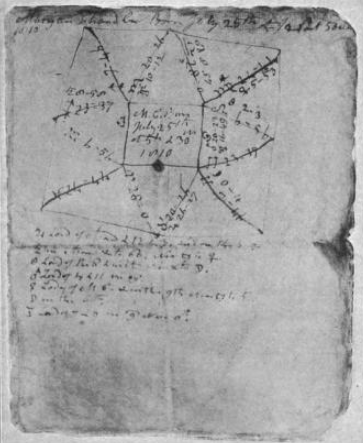
Reproductions of pages from Murrell's books of magic; the left page depicts sigils and pentacles, the right depicts a horoscope.

Three decades after Murrell's death, in the late 19th century, Morrison visited Hadleigh on a holiday, expressing the view that the area was "still in the eighteenth century as regards aspect, costume, habits, and mode of thought". He learned about Murrell, and decided "to write a story about him", believing that "some might find it hard to believe that such a man, practicing such arts and wielding such influence, could have lived so recently within so short a distance from London". The landlord of the Castle Inn, a local pub, showed Morrison to the house in which Murrell had once lived, and the journalist was also able to meet with Choppen, the smith who had made Murrell's witch bottles. Morrison found that Choppen was living in a small house on the outskirts of Hadleigh; the craftsman revealed that while he had none of the bottles left, he was in possession of Murrell's spectacles. Morrison subsequently met with Murrell's son Edward – "a short, sturdy old fellow, with a shock head of loose, white hair" – who was then living in Thundersley. Morrison subsequently wrote Cunning Murrell, a fictitious account of Murrell's life, as well as a more objective account, the latter for The Strand magazine. It was Morrison's novel that turned Murrell into a national figure and "inflated the name of the old Essex wizard above all others of his craft".

At the turn of the century between the 19th and 20th, the Reverend King, an antiquarian who worked as the vicar of Leigh, began to examine Murrell's life, believing it to have had some significance, although never completed his research.

Murrell's correspondences and papers – then contained in the wooden chest owned by his son – were examined by Morrison during the course of his research. Morrison discovered that Murrell was in possession of the manuscript of Key of Solomon grimoire on which he based his magical practise. These texts survived until 1956, at which point they were burned by someone who did not believe them to be of any importance. Many of Murrell's handwritten books were also lost, although his scrapbook of astrological data had survived until at least the late 1950s, when it was in the collection of a local man who also possessed Murrell's iron churchwarden pipe.

Maple published a 1960 paper on Murrell in the Folklore Society's journal, Folklore, which was based both on the earlier textual sources and on oral traditions that he had obtained from elderly residents of the district. These included one of his descendants, a Mrs Murrell of Westcliff-on-Sea. Troubled by the mixed reception that Murrell had, she expressed the view that he was a good man. She also commented that Murrell's power to control mechanical objects had remained within the family, characterising them as "natural mechanics".
