= Eric Maple =

English folklorist

Eric Maple (1916–1994) was an English folklorist and author known for his studies of witchcraft and folk magic in late nineteenth and early twentieth-century Essex, in particular his first-hand research into the folklore surrounding the cunning men James Murrell and George Pickingill.

Born in Essex to a family of Kentish ancestry, his mother was a Spiritualist medium. Having little formal education, he has been described as a "self-made man". In the early 1950s, he discovered the scholarly field of folkloristics, and decided to use a folkloric methodology to explore the folk stories of his home county. This resulted in the publication of four research articles in Folklore, the journal of The Folklore Society: "Cunning Murrel" (March 1960), "The Witches of Canewdon" (December 1960), "The Witches of Dengie" (Autumn 1962), and "Witchcraft and Magic in the Rochford Hundred" (Autumn 1965). The folklorist Alan A. Smith would later describe these papers as "a perhaps unique contribution to the literature of English witchcraft. Totally jargon-free, they are the raw stuff of folklore, stories told by real people about still remembered (reputed) witches and their doings." These articles and others would be reprinted in Essex Countryside in a series, "Legends of the Essex Witches".

He then embarked on authoring a wide range of books about folklore and the supernatural for a popular audience, which proved sufficiently financially successful that he became a full-time writer. However, these books eschewed any academic standards, with Smith noting that they lacked "the strength" of his earlier papers in Folklore.
