= George Pickingill =

English farm labourer; cunning man (c. 1816–1909)

- Photograph allegedly of Pickingill taken in the late nineteenth or early twentieth century. (Note: The original copy of this photograph was owned by Lillian Garner, who claimed that it was of George Pickingill and who allowed for it to be first published by Eric Maple; in 1977 she gave her original copy of the photograph to Michael Howard. In a July 1984 issue of Insight magazine, a letter was published by John Pope stating that "The photograph purporting to be Old George Pickingill is in fact a photo of Alf Cavill, a station porter at Elstree, taken in the early 1960s. Alf is now dead, but he was no witch, and laughed over the photograph when he saw it." Wiccan historian Julia Phillips cautioned however that "a very respected Craft authority has told me that he believes the photo, which is in his possession, to be of Pickingill, and I have no reason to disbelieve him.")
- Born: Circa 1816; Hockley, Essex, England
- Died: 10 April 1909; Canewdon, Essex, England
- Occupation(s): Cunning man, farm labourer
- Spouse: Sarah Ann Bateman (m. 1856–87)
- Children: Martha Ann, Charles Frederick, Mary Ann, George
- Parent(s): Charles Pickingill, Susannah Cudner

George Pickingill (c. 1816 – 10 April 1909) was an English farm labourer who lived and worked in the village of Canewdon in the eastern English county of Essex. Widely considered to be a cunning man, or vocational folk magician, he reportedly employed magical means to offer cures for ailments and to locate lost property, although was also alleged to have threatened to place curses on people.

Born into a rural working-class family, Pickingill grew up in Hockley, Essex and was baptised into the Church of England. Working as a farm labourer, in 1856 he married Sarah Ann Bateman in Gravesend, Kent. The couple moved back to Essex, settled in Canewdon and had four children. Pickingill's wife died in 1887, and in later life he attracted limited press attention for his claim to be one of the oldest men in England. These claims also appeared in his obituaries, although were later shown to be incorrect.

Pickingill was brought to wider public attention in the early 1960s by the folklorist Eric Maple. As part of his research into beliefs regarding folk magic and witchcraft in nineteenth-century Essex, Maple had interviewed a number of Canewdon residents and collected their stories about Pickingill and his reputation as a cunning man. According to their accounts, Pickingill attracted visitors from around Essex seeking his magical help, for which he did not charge. They attributed to him the power to control animals, to command imps to do his bidding, and to wield power over either six or nine malevolent witches who lived in Canewdon. It was also claimed that he was able to coerce assistance and beer from local residents by threatening to place a curse upon them or their belongings. Although it has been suggested that local people were inventing claims to please Maple, many of which were based on older tales regarding the Essex cunning man James Murrell, subsequent research by historian Ronald Hutton has confirmed aspects of the folklorist's original accounts.

In the 1970s, the occultist E.W. "Bill" Liddell began publicising claims that secretive hereditary witch families had informed him that Pickingill was not simply a rural cunning man but that he was a major figure in the nineteenth-century esoteric community. According to Liddell's account—which has failed to receive any scholarly support—Pickingill was a member of a hereditary witch-cult, leading a Canewdon coven and forming nine other covens across southern England. Liddell claimed that Pickingill reformed the established English witch-cult by introducing new concepts from French and Danish witchcraft and from Classical sources, and that in doing so, Pickingill created the structure from which Gardnerian Wicca emerged in the 1950s. Prominent Wiccans Doreen Valiente and Lois Bourne have expressed criticism of his claims, which have also been rejected as spurious by such historians and scholars of religion as Maple, Hutton, Owen Davies, and Aidan A. Kelly.

== Biography ==
=== Life and family ===
George Pickingill was the son of Charles Pickingill, a labourer and blacksmith, and Susannah Cudner, a woman who also went by the name of Hannah Cudmore; the couple had married on 17 September 1813. Although he had no known birth record, according to parish records, George Pickingill was baptised on 26 May 1816 at the church in Hockley. The year of Pickingill's birth is however in question, as he made differing claims in different censuses; in the 1851 census, he claimed to be 26, meaning that his birth would have occurred circa 1825, while in the 1861 census, he claimed to be 46, which would have placed his birth c.1815. By the time of the 1901 census, he was claiming to be 95, moving his birth to c.1806; it has been suggested that he made himself appear older to ease the process of collecting parish assistance from the church. Throughout his life, Pickingill would also use a variety of different spellings of his surname on official records, including Pickengill, Pickingale, Pickengal, Pettingale, Pitengale, and Pittengale.

It is apparent from census data that Pickingill lived with his parents from 1816 until the 1830s, although it is not stated where he was living at the time of the 1841 census. In 1851, he was recorded as lodging in the household of David Clemens in Little Wakering, Essex, and describing himself as a farm labourer by profession. On 18 May 1856 he married Sarah Ann Bateman at St George's Church, an Anglican church in Gravesend, Kent. In that record, both Pickingill and Bateman described themselves as residing in Gravesend, and Pickingill declared that he was working as a labourer; no profession was listed for Bateman. Bateman was born c.1831 in Tillingham, Essex, as the daughter of Joseph Bateman and his wife Mary Ann Aggus; throughout married life, she identified as "Mary Ann Pickingill" and appeared as "Sarah Ann Pittengale" in her burial record.

On 22 June 1858 the couple's daughter, Martha Ann, was born in Hawkwell, Essex. By 1861 they had moved to Eastwood, Essex, where they were recorded in that year's census. Here, Pickingill described himself as an agricultural labourer. That same year, their son Charles Frederick was born. The following year, Pickingill's wife was caught stealing two pecks of potatoes, and subsequently fined ten shillings. In 1863, a second daughter, named Mary Ann, was born to the couple.

"[Pickingill] still gets his own meals ready, and fills in odd moments by pottering about in the garden. 'Yes, I'm a hundred and five,' he said, 'and feel good for another 20 years. I was born in Hockley, and I've been in these parts, working on farms, all my life. I only stopped working at 90.' The aged man has never seen a railway train. A Press representative took the 'old boy' for a ride round in a motor car, much to his delight. 'I'd like to go to London on it,' he said. 'I've never been to London.' When asked how to live to be 105, he laughed and said, 'You just go on living – that's all.' He still likes his pipe of tobacco and mug of ale."

— Essex Newsman, 19 September 1908.

At some point in the coming four years, the Pickingill family moved to Canewdon, where another son, George, was born in 1876. The couple and their four children were then recorded in the 1871 census, where Pickingill was again listed as working as an agricultural labourer. In the 1881 census, the couple were recorded as living with two of their children, Mary Ann and George, and Pickingill was again identifying as a labourer. On 17 August 1887, a homeless man named James Taylor stole a jacket and pair of leather gloves from Pickingill. Taylor was arrested and brought to trial in Rochford on 24 August; in October, he pleaded guilty to the theft of the jacket, although not to those of the other items. He was sentenced to six months imprisonment with hard labour.

On 13 September 1887 Pickingill's wife died at the age of 63 in Canewdon; her death was attributed to a disease of the liver by the certifying doctor. She was buried at Canewdon's St. Nicholas Church on 17 September. According to the 1891 census, Pickingill was still employed as an agricultural labourer, and was living in Canewdon with his married daughter Marry Ann and his granddaughter, Emily Wood. Records show that he was living in a rented cottage with an adjacent garden, and that in July 1899 the owner sold the property at auction. By 1901 he was listed as living on parish relief, with his two sons back living with him.

By this time, Pickingill was increasingly inflating his age, eventually claiming that he was 105 years old. This attracted attention from other areas, including London, and in September 1908 a journalist visited Canewdon; he arrived by automobile, the first that Pickingill had ever seen, and allowed the old man to ride in it. The journalist subsequently wrote an article about the alleged centegenerian, in which he claimed that his name was "Frederick Pickingale"; it is possible that Pickingill gave the false name so that no one would be able to look up the parish records and discover his real age. Maple described Pickingill as "a tall, unkempt man, solitary and uncommunicative. He had very long finger-nails, and kept his money in a purse of sacking". He also noted that he had worked as a farm labourer and that he was a widower with two sons.

=== Magical activities ===
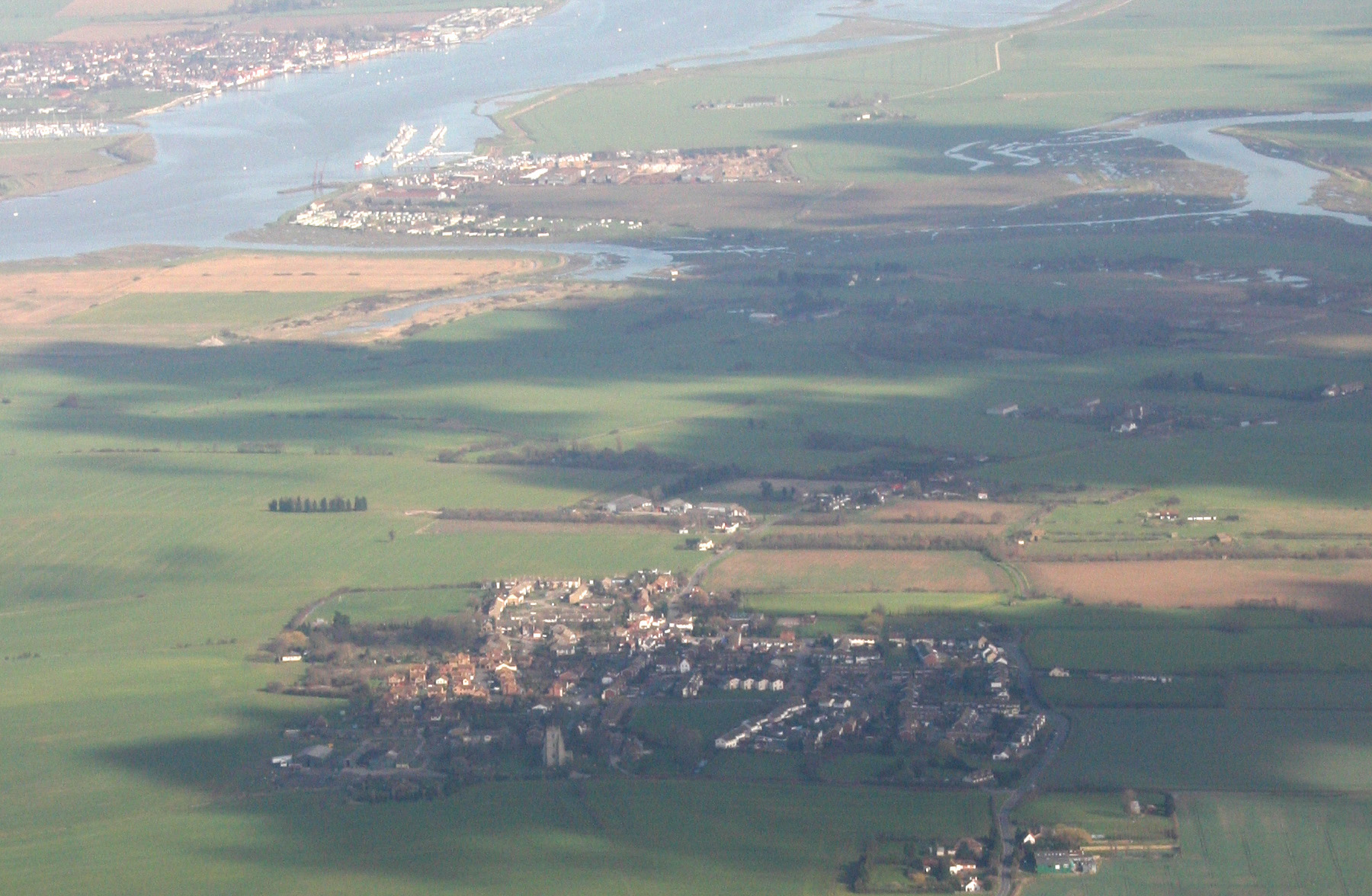
Aerial photo of Canewdon, 2007

The first printed account of Pickingill that described him as a cunning man appeared fifty years after his death. This was provided by the folkorist Eric Maple, who was making a systematic study of nineteenth-century traditions regarding witchcraft and magic in south-eastern Essex, and who examined the case of Canewdon in the winter of 1959–60. He had begun his enquiries by meeting with a number of elderly local residents at the home of the schoolmistress, from whom he gained a variety of tales pertaining to magical practices in the village. His initial findings were published in 1960 in the scholarly journal Folklore, produced by The Folklore Society. Maple followed this article with a shorter piece written for 'Essex Countryside Magazine' (Vol.18 No.58 - November 1961). He subsequently produced a sensationalist popular history of witchcraft, The Dark World of Witches (1962), in which he repeated many of the claims regarding Pickingill. In this work, he erroneously described south-eastern Essex as the last bastion of English witchcraft beliefs, and ignored scholarly conventions in relating his information, resulting in a critical reception from folklorists; the book nevertheless was popular and sold well.

Maple noted that, unusually—given his role as a cunning man—Pickingill did not charge for his services, but did receive some money from visitors, and that his recorded roles included restoring lost property and curing minor ailments, both of which were common practices amongst British cunning folk. According to one account, he cured a woman of rheumatism by transferring the ailment to her father. Maple wrote that Pickingill was known to use cursing and malevolent magic on occasion, something that the folklorist contrasted with the activities of other contemporary cunning folk that he had studied, such as James Murrell. At harvest time, Maple recorded, Pickingill was known to wander around the field threatening to bewitch farm machinery, with many farmers thus offering him beer so that he would leave them alone. He was also recorded as coercing local people to obtain water for him from the village pump by threatening to set upon them white mice, a rodent which in local folklore was associated with misfortune. Another tale that Maple recorded also associated Pickingill with white mice; according to this, a visitor travelled to the cunning man's cottage only to find him lying in bed, with the mice suckling from his nipples.

Pickingill was also known for his purported ability to control animals, namely horses, and it was believed that when he struck a hedgerow with his stick, game animals would run out that could then be caught, killed and eaten. It was also rumoured that he could do things faster than ordinary human beings, and that he could do an hour's job in only a few minutes, with some believing that he got his imps—his familiar spirits—to do the job for him. Maple also noted that people who visited his cottage reported seeing ornaments and furniture dancing around the room of their own accord; the folklorist believed that this story had originated in a Dutch folkloric tradition that may have been imported to Essex when many Dutch migrants settled there in the seventeenth century.

According to Maple, Pickingill was sufficiently well known in Essex as an accomplished cunning man that people came to visit him from outside Canewdon in search of magical aid, sometimes "from great distances", including men from the Essex village of Dengie, who sought his advice in a wage dispute. Meanwhile, as Maple noted, Canewdon had developed a reputation associating it with witchcraft and magic by the end of the nineteenth century, when it was often thought of as "The Witch Country" and avoided by many wagoners who feared having their vehicles bewitched. This was possibly due to its relative isolation from neighbouring settlements, as it was surrounded by marshland, and the insular nature of its community. Maple recorded that in this period there was a rumour that there were either six or nine elderly women living in Canewdon who were malevolent witches and used their magic to harm others. It was believed that whilst they were not known to one another, they all owed their allegiance to a singular wizard or master of witches, and there was a rumour in the local community that Pickingill himself was this figure. It was claimed that as "Master of Witches", Pickingill simply had to whistle in order for these nine witches to stand by their front doors and reveal their identities, or that alternately he could "will them" to dance for him in the local churchyard.

"When my sister and I were children, we wanted to ride our pony and trap to Rochford Fair; but that day the beast just wouldn't move, no matter what we did with it. Then we suddenly saw George Pickingill staring at us with those terrible eyes of his. He came over and told us to put down the reins and not to interfere with the pony at all. Then he whispered in its ear for a few minutes and stood back and hit it; and it started off, and found its way down the lanes to Rochford, without our needing to touch it."

— Jack Taylor, interviewed by Ronald Hutton, 1967.

Subsequent researchers also travelled to Canewdon to meet with Maple's informants and confirm his account for themselves. In April 1967, aged just 14, Ronald Hutton visited the village where he met with elderly resident Lillian Garner, who had been one of Maple's informants. He also found an informant that Maple had not encountered, an old man named Jack Taylor, then living in a retirement home. Taylor claimed that as a young man he knew Pickingill, and that the latter had the power of horse-whispering—the magical ability to command horses to do his bidding. On the whole, Hutton found that the account of Pickingill among the local people to whom he spoke was entirely consistent with that provided by Maple. (Note: After being queried on the year in question, Ronald Hutton confirmed to Michael Howard that the 1967 date was correct, and that he had been thirteen years old at the time in which he undertook these inquiries at Canewdon.) In 1977 Hutton was followed by the Gardnerian Wiccan initiate Michael Howard, who met with Garner, then eighty-seven years old. On this occasion, she recalled Pickingill being photographed with the first car to arrive in the village, and also gave Howard the original copy of a photograph of him that was in her possession. She then added the information—which she had not given to Maple or Hutton—that her own mother had talked of Pickingill leading a local coven, and that he received "many visitors" from "a long way away" who sought his magical knowledge.

A different account was provided by Charles Lefebvre, an American author of the sensationalist Witness to Witchcraft (1970). Here, his use of sources was unclear, although he asserted that Pickingill had had an ageless body, was a relative of Roma people, was the last survivor of an old witch family, held Black Masses and orgies in the church yard, and was visited by "black magicians" from across Europe. According to Lefebvre, Pickingill was finally killed when confronted by the sign of the cross. Hutton later described these as "fantasies" which served to support Lefebvre's view that witchcraft should be criminalised.

However, claims have since been made that Pickingill was not a cunning man or involved in folk magic at all. Local Canewdon historian Sylvia Webster expressed her view to Howard that tales regarding Pickingill's magical practices had been invented by the locals of Canewdon to impress Maple. Supporting this position, she highlighted that there was no evidence to suggest that Pickingill was a cunning man prior to Maple's publications. Similarly, Richard Ward argued that the contemporary obituaries and interviews conducted with Pickingill had shown no evidence of any magical activities, when such might have been expected. Ward suggested that many of the stories regarding Pickingill's magical activities were adapted from those of a genuine Essex cunning man, James Murrell. Hutton responded critically to Ward's claims, highlighting his own investigations into the local folklore and his interview with Taylor to express the view that there "seems little doubt" that Pickingill was a cunning man, although "there are still questions over what sort of one he was". At the same time, Hutton also accepted the possibility that some of the legends associated with Murrell had come to be associated with Pickingill, although stated that this seemed to be "incapable of solid proof". In his counter-response to Hutton, Ward accepting that Pickingill could have been associated with "some apparent supernatural control or knowledge of horses" as Taylor had claimed, but that this did not automatically make him a cunning man, for which there remained no contemporary historical evidence.

=== Death ===
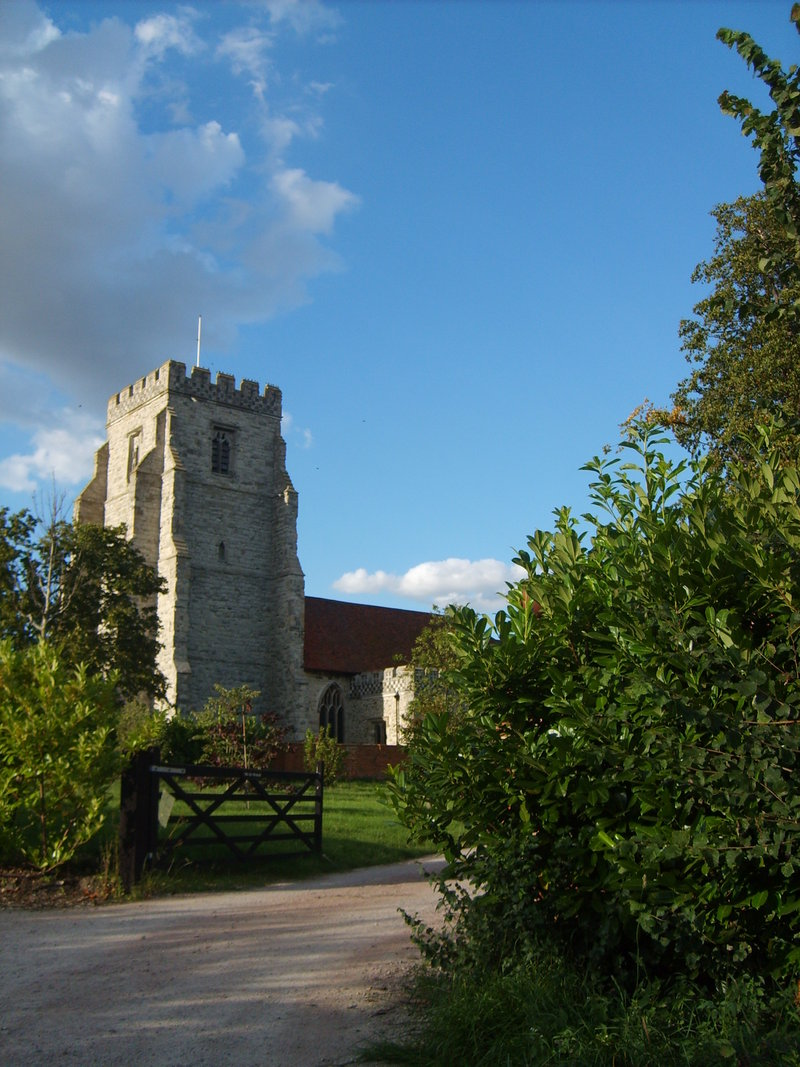
Canewdon's St Nicholas Church, Pickingill's burial site

According to Maple's account, in the last few weeks of Pickingill's life, when he had become very ill, the local people moved him to the infirmary against his will, where he declared that at his funeral there would be one more demonstration of his magical powers. Many locals interpreted this as coming true when as the hearse carrying his coffin drew up to the churchyard, the horses stepped out of their harness shafts. His body was subsequently buried in the church's graveyard, whilst his abandoned house gradually became dilapidated before falling down.

According to his death certificate, "George Pettingale" died on 10 April 1909 at the age of 103, and his cause of death was "senile decay" and "cardiac failure". He was buried at Canewdon's St Nicholas Church on 14 April; although his stated age of 103 was recorded, the vicar added a note asserting that this was erroneous, for in reality Pickingill was "born at Hockley 1816 [and] was only in his 93rd year".

Pickingill's death attracted national press attention. It was claimed in both the Essex Newsman and The Times that he was "believed to be the oldest man in England"; these publications recorded his age as 106. The story was also picked up by New Zealand newspaper The Star, in which he was described as "the oldest man in England".

According to Maple, Pickingill left "a legacy of myth which is curiously alien to the general run of witch traditions. In all the stories told of Pickingill there is a subtle undercurrent of horror which one finds hard to pinpoint. Possibly it arises from the fact that many of those who recount the tales actually knew the man and experienced just such a quiet terror when he passed them in the village street."

== Bill Liddell's claims ==
In 1974, a writer began sending articles to Pagan newsletter The Wiccan, then edited by the Gardnerian Wiccan John Score, articulating an alternative account of Pickingill's life and relation to the British occult movement. First identifying himself only as "a well wisher", he later began using the pseudonym Lugh, named for the Irish mythological figure. In 1977, Lugh ceased sending the articles to The Wiccan and instead began publishing them in a rival British magazine, The Cauldron, edited by Michael Howard; he claimed to have switched outlets because The Wiccan had been too dominated by Gardnerian perspectives. Lugh later revealed his name to be E.W. "Bill" Liddell, describing himself as an Englishman born in Essex. He added that circa 1960 he had moved to Auckland, New Zealand, before later relocating to Australia, from where he wrote his articles. In a 1984 letter he noted that he was not born with the surname of Liddell but had instead adopted it later in life. Claiming that Pickingill had been the first-cousin of his paternal great-great-grandfather, Liddell asserted that he had been initiated into his family's hereditary form of witchcraft in 1950, and that he had subsequently been initiated into both the Gardnerian and Alexandrian traditions of Wicca. His partner, Sylvia Tatham, had been heavily involved in the development of the Alexandrian tradition in the early 1960s, having been one of those present when its founder, Alex Sanders, was initiated into the Gardnerian tradition. In 1982, Wiccan Publications collected together and published these articles as two pamphlets: Old George Pickingill and the Roots of Modern Witchcraft and Medieval Witchcraft and the Freemasons. The articles were republished in one single volume in 1994 as The Pickingill Papers, edited by Liddell and Howard.

"The Lugh corpus was expressly written to be confrontational. Several surviving Craft families, a number of solitaries, and my own Brethren were at first amused – and then alarmed – at the Witchcraft beliefs being propounded by Gerald Gardner and Alex Sanders. The tenets of Wicca bore little resemblance to the rites and practices of traditional witchcraft in England. My Brethren decided to take the bull by the horns and find a public platform to explain that there were a number of disparate witch traditions."

— Bill Liddell, 1999.

Liddell's claims regarding Pickingill are self-contradictory. Liddell explained this by stating that the information contained in his articles had been passed on to him by three separate sources, all of which had decided to use him as a mouthpiece for their own claims. The first were the members of a hereditary tradition of Pagan witchcraft, while the second were the practitioners of a similar yet separate tradition of Pagan witchcraft which, Liddell alleged, had been greatly influenced by Pickingill in the nineteenth century. The third source cited by Liddell was his own experiences gained from being born into a witchcraft family and subsequently being initiated into both of the aforementioned traditions and a separate "cunning lodge". He claimed that most of the information that he was publishing came from "Elders", or older members, involved in the first two of these traditions, and that as such he could not vouch for its accuracy, going so far as to state that he doubted the veracity of much of it.

Noting that these Elders themselves had very different opinions on Gardnerian Wicca, he also stated that the Elders ceased providing him with new information in the early 1980s. He stated that these various Elders had chosen him to disseminate the information because he had been involved in both hereditary witchcraft and Gardnerian Wicca and because he was based in New Zealand, thereby making it hard for anyone to trace their identities. Despite Liddell claiming that the material he was putting forward came from various sources, the historian Ronald Hutton noted that it was all presented in a "single, dogmatic, authorial voice", with no indication of where the different pieces of information came from. Hutton also asserted that Liddell's changing claims would be entirely consistent with a single individual making up stories and changing them as they went along.

=== Liddell's account ===
According to Liddell's initial 1974 claims, since the eleventh century the Pickingill family had been priests of a pre-Christian, pagan religion devoted to the worship of the Horned God. In this, his claims fitted within the historical framework of the discredited witch-cult hypothesis as propagated in the works of Margaret Murray. Later he added that the "medieval witch cult" was influenced by the "tenets" of the Iron Age druids, in particular their knowledge of ley lines which were marked out by the stone circles erected in the Neolithic and Bronze Ages. Conflicting with these ideas, in 1998 Liddell personally informed Hutton that the witch-cult did not derive from ancient pre-Christian religion but that it instead had been founded in fifteenth-century France, emerging from a union between Christian heretics, cunning lodges, and a cult of Lucifer founded by Islamic Moors with the intent of undermining Christianity.

"[George Pickingill] was more famous in his heydey than Crowley was in his. Old George was acknowledged as the world's greatest living authority on witchcraft, Satanism and black magic. He was consulted by occultists of every hue and tradition who came from all over Europe, England and even America."

— Bill Liddell, 1974.

Liddell claimed that the Pickingill family had many links to the travelling Romani population, and that Pickingill spent many of his early years in a Romani caravan. Liddell claimed that Pickingill faced persecution as a result, and that he "set out to terrify" the locals of Canewdon in retaliation. According to Liddell, Pickingill was trained in Romani magic, and thus in later life became "the most famous gypsy kako in England". Liddell also claimed that Pickingill despised Christianity and wanted to see it overthrown; to this end he collaborated with Satanists and included Satanic elements within his ritual practices, something which horrified other members of the East Anglian witch-cult. Thus, according to Liddell, Pickingill was "England's most feared and vilified 'Satanist'". Elsewhere, he stressed that Pickingill was not a Satanist, but rather that he had been considered such by other witches because he practised sex magic.

Liddell asserted that Pickingill spent time in France, where he was initiated into a local form of the witch-cult. According to this account, upon his return to Canewdon, Pickingill was invited to lead a local coven which had been operating since the mid-fifteenth century—the "Seven Witches of Canewdon"—and that he continued to lead the group until disbanding it several years prior to his death. Liddell added that Pickingill proceeded to introduce many new innovations into the English witch-cult by applying concepts borrowed from the Danish and French witch-cults, namely the idea that the coven should be led by a woman. Liddell asserted that Pickingill then established nine covens in England, spread out in Essex, Norfolk, Hertfordshire, Sussex, and Hampshire; he further added that two of those covens, based in Hertfordshire and Norfolk, survived into at least the 1970s. According to Liddell, Pickingill was propagating witchcraft in a reformed, female-oriented form because the oncoming Age of Aquarius would be more receptive to this form of spirituality.

In Liddell's account, Pickingill travelled widely and joined a variety of cunning lodges, gaining access to their grimoires and libraries. According to Liddell, from the 1850s onward Pickingill began co-operating with a group of Freemasons who considered themselves to be Rosicrucians and who wanted to prove that Freemasonry and Rosicrucianism were "siblings" of the witch-cult. Two of these Freemasons, Hargrave Jennings and W.J. Hughan, became pupils of Pickingill, who aided them in producing a Rosicrucian Manifesto that was used in the formation of the Societas Rosicruciana in 1865. According to Liddell, Pickingill's involvement with Freemasons also led to the foundation of the Hermetic Order of the Golden Dawn in 1888. Liddell also asserted that Pickingill was influenced by a coven that had been founded in the early nineteenth century by a group of Cambridge University academics led by Francis Barrett and whose rituals were based largely on Classical sources.

"The rites [George Pickingill] drafted emphasised ritual nudity, nature worship, the unity of the Goddess, female dominance, the five-fold kiss—without the words 'Blessed Be'—the Drawing Down of the Moon, the Goddess Charge, the Legend of the Goddess, induction by the opposite sex, a tri-gradal initiation structure, the use of magical cords etc. It is difficult not to recognise the basic features of what is now Gardnerian Wicca."

— Bill Liddell, 1984.

Liddell also claimed that the prominent occultist Aleister Crowley had been initiated into one of these nine covens as a young man. According to this account, Crowley had been introduced to the coven in 1899 or 1900 by his magical mentor, Allan Bennett. Liddell asserted that Crowley was subsequently ejected from the coven for his misbehaviour. As evidence for these claims, he stated that his own grandfather had been present on three occasions at which Bennett and Crowley met with Pickingill, and that he had seen a photograph in which the three figures are together. When asked to present this photograph for public scrutiny in 1977, Liddell claimed that it was "not available"; when independently asked again in 1983, he asserted that it had been stolen by "interested parties".

Further, Liddell stated that one of Pickingill's covens was the New Forest coven, a Wiccan group which Gerald Gardner—the founder of Gardnerian Wicca—claimed had initiated him in 1939. However, Liddell did later state that he was not certain whether this was true. He also asserted that Gardner later joined another of the Pickingill covens, based in Hertfordshire, through which he received "the Second Rite of the Hereditary Craft". Liddell stressed that this group was separate from Gardner's own Bricket Wood coven. He furthermore claimed that Gardner received the "Third Rite" from an East Anglian coven, with this three-degree system of initiation influencing that in Gardnerian Wicca. As a result, he stated that the structure and rituals of Gardnerian Wicca were based on those devised by Pickingill, and that "no impartial observer could fail to see that they formed the nucleus of the rites of Wicca." Liddell believed that while many hereditary witches despised him, Gardner represented "the spiritual heir of Pickingill", because he had similarly reformed and propagated witchcraft for contemporary purposes.

=== Pagan response ===
Liddell's claims have received a mixed response from the British Wiccan community. Score championed them in private letters to his correspondents, declaring that they proved that the Gardnerian tradition had historical origins predating Gardner. His successor as editor of The Wiccan, Leonora James, was intrigued by Liddell's claims and investigated the original records pertaining to Pickingill's life; however, by the 1980s she had concluded that Liddell's claims were spurious. In her 1978 book Witchcraft for Tomorrow, the Wiccan Doreen Valiente – who had been Gardner's High Priestess in the Bricket Wood coven during the 1950s—stated that she had an "East Anglian source" from Essex who claimed that many of Liddell's assertions were correct. In particular, the informant championed Liddell's claims that Crowley had been an initiate of one of Pickingill's covens. By the time of her 1989 book The Rebirth of Witchcraft, Valiente was more sceptical of Liddell's claims, noting that any supporting evidence was "still sadly lacking".

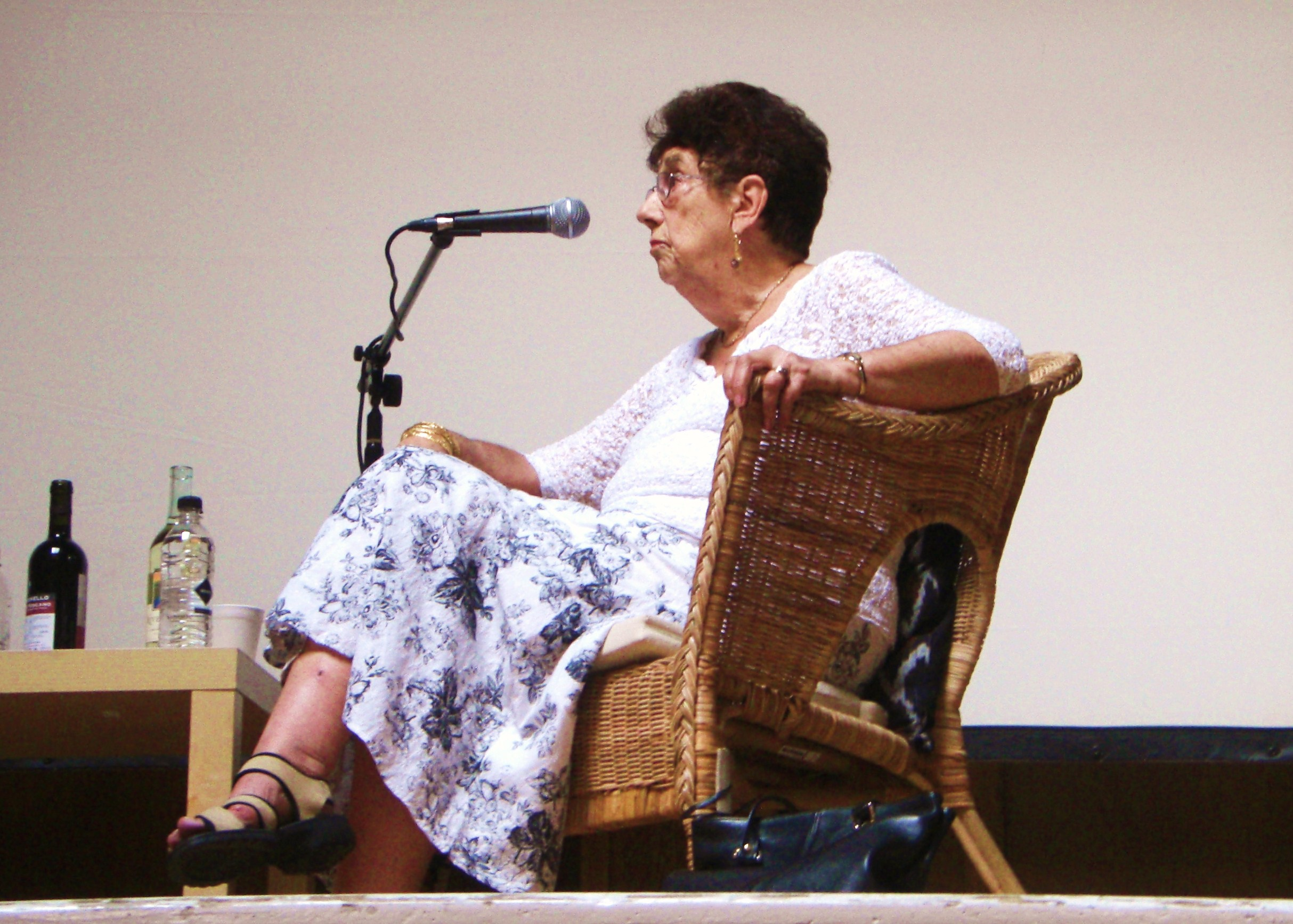
Lois Bourne (pictured in 2010) is one of the prominent Wiccans to have criticised Liddell's claims.

Another of Gardner's High Priestesses, Lois Bourne, asserted that she was "as sure as I can be" that Gardner had nothing to do with any witches from Canewdon and that if they existed in the first place, then they must have belonged to a tradition distinct from Gardnerian Wicca. Privately, the Gardnerian initiate and founder of Alexandrian Wicca, Alex Sanders, rejected the claims that Liddell made. In his 2013 biography of Valiente, Jonathan Tapsell stated that the Liddell material was "generally regarded as a hoax", being "a spurious history at best, or a malicious prank at worst." Hutton asserted that the only "sustained champion" of Liddell's claims has been Michael Howard, noting that he had defended such ideas in a "limited and measured" manner. Pagan studies scholar Ethan Doyle White noted that in his history of the Traditional Witchcraft movement, Children of Cain, Howard "remains cautious and refrains from accepting [Liddell's claims] outright". Howard has maintained that he keeps an "open mind" about Liddell's claims, noting that while no evidence has been brought forward to substantiate them, similarly he does not believe that "any real evidence" has been brought forth to disprove them.

Support for Liddell's story came from Cecil Williamson, founder of the Museum of Witchcraft, who claimed to have known about Pickingill through his acquaintances with both Crowley and Gardner. However, Williamson was an unreliable source, and was known to repeatedly fabricate claims regarding past events. Another figure, known only as Colonel Lawrence, also supported Liddell's story, asserting that his own great-grandmother had studied under Pickingill and thus had been introduced to Crowley; as with Williamson's, however, Lawrence's claims are unreliable, particularly as he has made the unsupported claim that his great-grandmother studied witchcraft under the American folklorist Charles Leland. Also supporting Liddell's claims was the Wiccan Ralph Harvey, who, following the publication of Liddell's material, publicly declared that in the 1950s or 1960s he had been initiated into one of Pickingill's Nine Covens, located in Storrington, Sussex. Following the publication of Liddell's claims, a number of covens appeared in both the United States and Australia claiming to be practitioners of a tradition originating with Pickingill. Liddell himself has been critical of such groups, expressing his regret that the material he published led to their formation.

=== Academic response ===
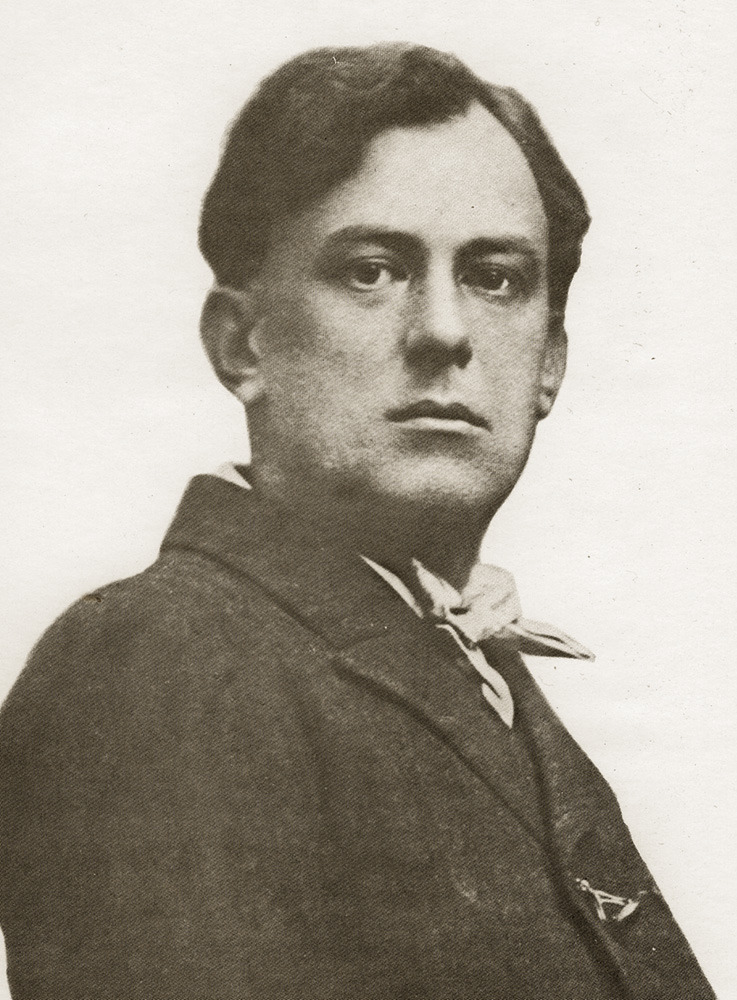
Liddell's assertion that occultist Aleister Crowley (pictured in 1912) was an initiate of one of Pickingill's covens has been heavily scrutinised and discredited.

Liddell's claims have had a far more critical reception from scholars specialising in magic and witchcraft in British history. In 1975, Eric Maple dismissed Lugh's claims as preposterous. He believed that such tales had been fabricated by someone who had used his own book, The Dark World of Witches, as a basis. Maple informed the historian James W. Baker that he believed people connected to Valiente were behind the Lugh claims, although Baker disagreed, commenting that Valiente was "one of the most honest of commentators on the subject" of contemporary witchcraft, and that as a result was unlikely to be involved in such duplicity. Baker described Liddell's account as "an extravagant hoax", with its claims constituting "a preposterous ahistorical muddle".

Historian Ronald Hutton also scrutinised Liddell's claims, although added that he had corresponded with Liddell "at length and in detail", over the course of which he had come to like him, noting that "he has responded to often forceful criticisms with patience, modesty, and good humour". However, Hutton highlighted that no independent witnesses have emerged to support the existence of Liddell's alleged informants, while no supporting documentation has appeared to back any of his many claims. Hutton deemed this particularly unusual, because were Liddell's claims to have been accurate, much documentary evidence could be expected to exist. Focusing on Liddell's claim that Crowley had been initiated into one of Pickingill's covens during the 1890s, Hutton noted that there is no mention of Pickingill or a witches' coven in either Crowley's published work or personal diaries, and that similarly there was no mention of either in the diaries of Bennett, who was Crowley's magical tutor during the 1890s.

Hutton's assessment was shared by historian Owen Davies; in his study of English cunning-folk, he described Liddell's stories as "seductive but entirely unsubstantiated". Instead, he maintained that Pickingill was "a simple rural cunning-man whose small world of village affairs never crossed with that of middle-class occultists. He received a Christian burial and the idea that he was a pagan priest would probably make him turn in his grave." While agreeing with Maple's assessment that Pickingill was "one of the last practising cunning-folk in the country", Maple noted that—unlike Murrell, James Tuckett, John Wrightson, and William Brewer—Pickingill was not a "major regional figure" in the profession.

American Pagan studies enthusiast Aidan A. Kelly similarly rejected Liddell's claims. Kelly highlighted that whereas Liddell had claimed that Gardnerian Wicca had adopted the concept of a female coven leader from French and Scandinavian witch covens, the historical evidence clearly showed that Gardner developed the concept of a coven being led by a high priestess during the late 1950s, thus disproving Liddell's assertions. He noted that Liddell's claim that Crowley wrote Gardner's Book of Shadows "cannot possibly be true" because Crowley died before the Book was written. Kelly believed that either Liddell or his Elders had purposely created a "phony history" in order to hide the fact that Gardner had invented Wicca in its entirety in the early 1950s. Similarly, in a 2014 article about Pickingill in The Cauldron, Richard Ward argued that Liddell's claims did not stand up under scrutiny, and that they had simply been made in an attempt to promote claims regarding the existence of a "pre-Gardnerian tradition" of witchcraft. Liddell has specifically denied any charges that he was deliberately falsifying claims to make Gardnerian Wicca appear to have an older pedigree than it really has.
