= Cunning folk in Britain =

Practitioners of folk magic

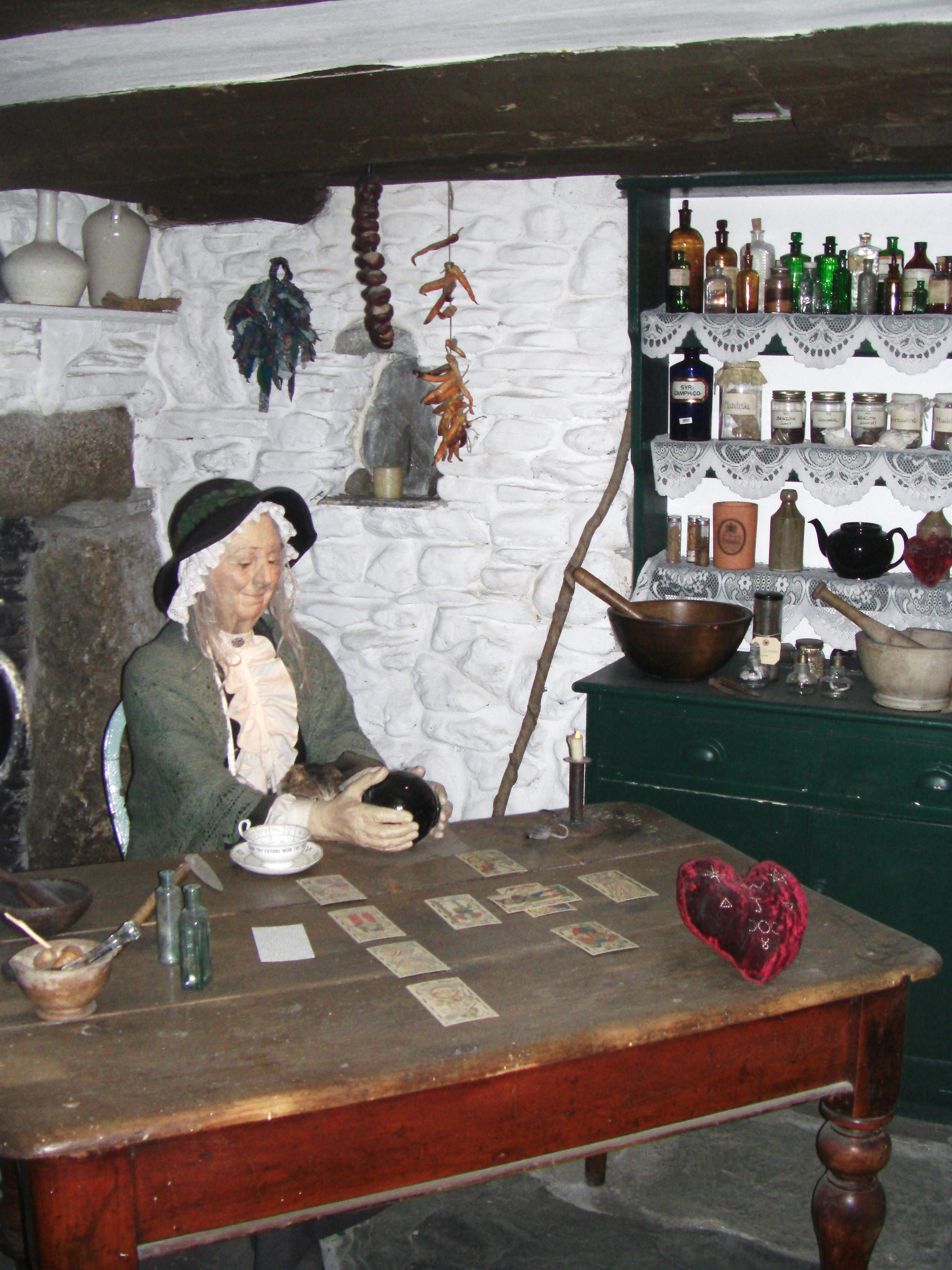
A model of a nineteenth-century cunning woman in her house, at the Museum of Witchcraft, Boscastle in England

The cunning folk were professional or semi-professional practitioners of magic in Europe from the medieval period to the early 20th century. In Britain they were known by a variety of names in different regions of the country, including wise men and wise women, pellars, wizards, dyn hysbys, and sometimes white witches.

Cunning folk practised folk and low magic – although often combined with elements of "high" or ceremonial magic – which they learned through the study of grimoires. Primarily using spells and charms as a part of their profession, they were most commonly employed to use their magic to combat malevolent witchcraft, to locate criminals, missing persons or stolen property, for fortune telling, for healing, for treasure hunting and to influence people to fall in love. Belonging "to the world of popular belief and custom", the cunning folk's magic has been defined as being "concerned not with the mysteries of the universe and the empowerment of the magus [as ceremonial magic usually is], so much as with practical remedies for specific problems." However, other historians have noted that in some cases, there was apparently an "experimental or 'spiritual' dimension" to their magical practices, something which was possibly shamanic in nature.

Although the British cunning folk were in almost all cases Christian themselves, certain Christian theologians and Church authorities believed that, being practitioners of magic, the cunning folk were in league with the Devil and as such were akin to the more overtly Satanic and malevolent witches. Partly because of this, laws were enacted across England, Scotland and Wales that often condemned cunning folk and their magical practices, but there was no widespread persecution of them akin to the witch hunt, largely because most common people firmly distinguished between the two: witches were seen as being harmful and cunning folk as useful.

Comparable figures were found in other parts of Western Europe: in France, such terms as devins-guérisseurs and leveurs de sorts were used for them, whilst in the Netherlands they were known as toverdokters or duivelbanners, in Germany as Hexenmeisters and in Denmark as kloge folk. In Spain they were curanderos whilst in Portugal they were known as saludadores. It is widely agreed by historians and folklorists, such as Willem de Blécourt, Robin Briggs and Owen Davies, that the term "cunning folk" could be applied to all of these figures as well to reflect a pan-European tradition.

== Societal role ==
In Britain in the late medieval and Early Modern periods, folk magic was widely popular. Many individuals knew of some magical charms and spells, but there were also professionals who dealt in magic, including charmers, fortune tellers, astrologers and cunning folk, the last of whom were said to "possess a broader and deeper knowledge of such techniques and more experience in using them" than the average person; it was also believed that they "embodied or could work with supernatural power which greatly increased the effectiveness of the operations concerned."

The terms "cunning man" and "cunning woman" were most widely used in southern England, the Midlands, and in Wales. Such people were also frequently known across England as "wizards", "wise men" or "wise women", or in southern England and Wales as "conjurers" or as "dynion hysbys" in the Welsh language. In Cornwall they were sometimes referred to as "pellars", which some etymologists suggest originated from the term "expellers", referring to the practice of expelling evil spirits. Nineteenth-century folklorists often used the term "white witch" to refer to cunning folk, although this was infrequently used amongst the ordinary people themselves, as for them the term "witch" had general connotations of malevolence and evil.

=== Demographics ===
The number of cunning folk in Britain at any one time is uncertain. Nevertheless historian Owen Davies has speculated that, based on his own research into English cunning folk (which excluded those in Scotland and Wales), that "Up until the mid nineteenth century there may have been as many as several thousand working in England at any given time." Although there was a twentieth-century stereotype that cunning folk usually lived and worked in rural areas of Britain, evidence shows that there were also many in towns and cities. Around two-thirds of recorded cunning folk in Britain were male, although their female counterparts were "every bit as popular and commercially successful as the men, and indeed this was one of the few means by which ordinary women could achieve a respected and independent position" in the British society of the time.

The cunning folk of Britain were often from the societal class that included artisans, tradesmen, and farmers, and as such were commonly at least semi-literate and of a higher social position than common labourers. In many cases they continued in their ordinary line of work alongside earning money as a professional cunning man or woman. In almost all cases, cunning folk worked either alone, as a solitary magical practitioner, or with one other person, such as a spouse or sibling. The only known exception was in early nineteenth-century Manchester, where several cunning men used to meet in a group, centred around the most prominent of their members, a cunning fellow called Rawlinson. This method of working alone was one factor that separated the cunning folk from the stereotype of witches then prevalent in Britain, which often held that these witches met together in groups, sometimes known as covens, and at times flew through the air to get to their meeting points.

=== Becoming a cunning person ===
"Let me see how many trades have I to live by: First, I am a wise-woman, and a fortune-teller, and under that I deal in physicke and fore-speaking, in palmistry, and recovering of things lost. Next, I undertake to cure madd folkes; then I keepe gentlewomen lodgers, to furnish such chambers as I let out by the night: Then I am provided for bringing young wenches to bed; and, for a need, you see I can play the match-maker."

— Cunning woman in Thomas Heywood's 1638 play, The Wise Woman of Hogsdon

In most cases, it seems that individuals set themselves up as cunning folk with no former practice or training, although others came from a family background of professional magical practitioners. One of the most prominent examples of a family dynasty of cunning people was the Harries family from Cwrt y Cadno in Wales: Henry Harries (1739–1805) was a yeoman farmer who had interests in astrology and medicine but did not practice as a cunning man, whilst his son John (1785–1839) and two grandsons Henry and John instead became professionals in the field. As Owen Davies remarked, "There are a number of reasons why people may have wanted to become cunning-folk. The desire for money, power or social prestige, and even to do good, all undoubtedly played their part." Some practitioners genuinely believed they had magical powers, while some later admitted in court that they had no such powers but were simply pretending that they did to fool people for their money. Indeed, there was a great deal of variability amongst the British cunning folk, with historian Ronald Hutton remarking that "they appear as a remarkably heterogeneous collection of individuals, divided by at least as many characteristics as those which they had in common."

"Cunning-folk operated in a competitive market where reputations and first impressions were very important", and as such often worked on their personal promotion. Some were known to travel relatively large distances to visit their clients as well as making calls during the night if requested. Some, though by no means all, were also known to wear "striking costume or home decorations" to enhance their reputations as magical individuals-- a nineteenth-century cunning woman, for instance, might wear a conical hat and a robe with mystical signs on it, as well as hanging herbs and papers from the ceiling of her home. Similarly, James "Cunning" Murrell, the nineteenth-century cunning man of Hadleigh in south-east Essex, wore iron goggles and carried a whalebone umbrella whenever he went out, whilst Mother Merne, the late 19th and early 20th-century wise woman of Milborne Down in Dorset, kept guinea pigs, black hens, a black goat and a black cat; the cat would sit on her shoulder during consultations with clients.

== Services ==
The cunning folk typically performed several different services in their local communities, using what they claimed to be their own magical powers.

=== Opposing witchcraft ===
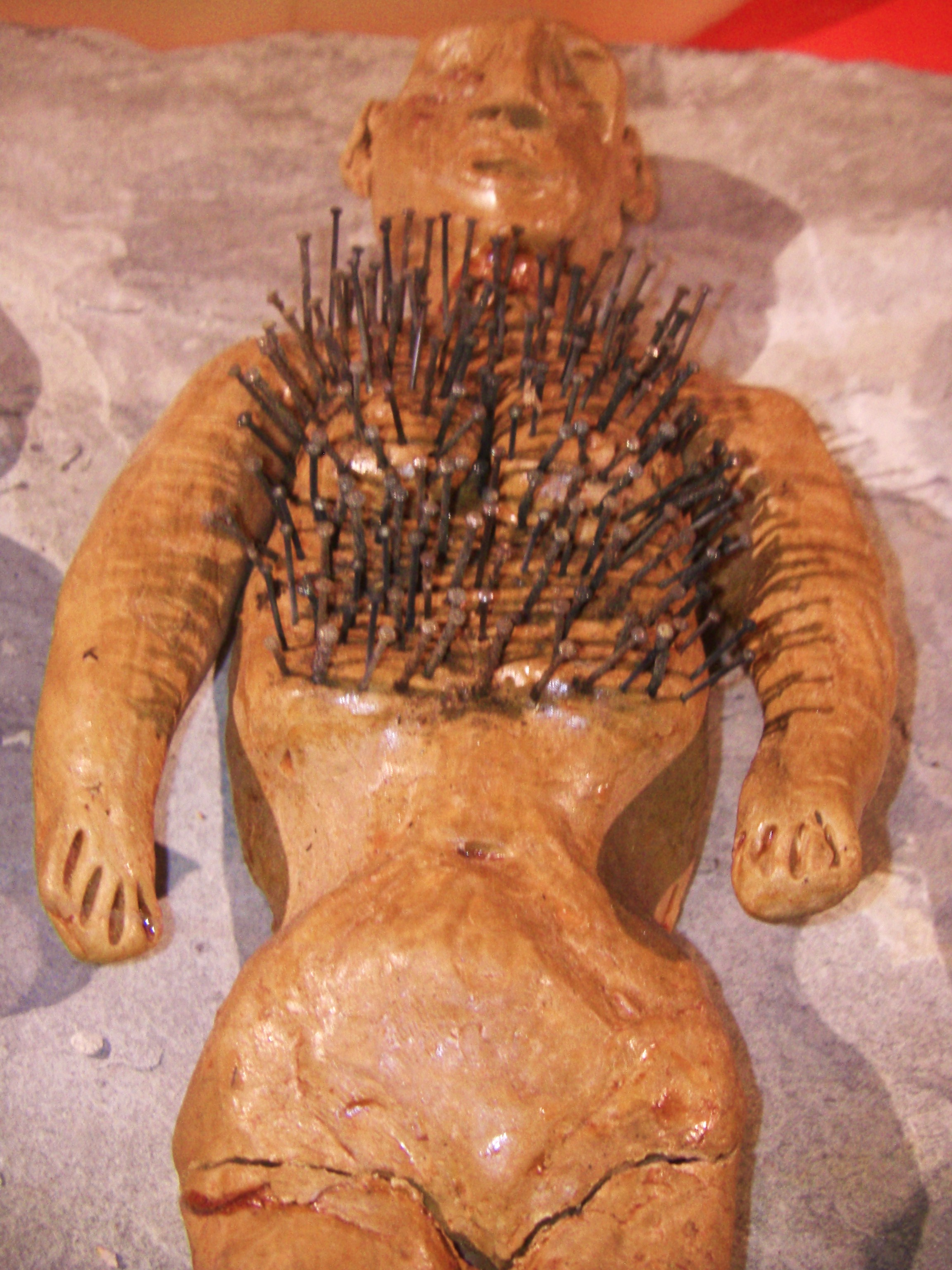
A humanoid figurine with pins stuck into it: this was one method by which cunning folk battled witches using magical means. Artefact at the Museum of Witchcraft and Magic in Boscastle, Cornwall.

One of the most common services that the cunning folk provided was in combating the effects of malevolent witchcraft and the curses which these witches had allegedly placed upon people. Alongside this, they were also known at times for identifying witches, and in this manner they were "the only healers to offer a comprehensive package of anti-witch measures." British cunning folk were known to use a variety of methods to cure someone of malevolent sorcery, including tackling the witch either physically or through the law courts, breaking the spell over the individual by magical means, and by using charms and potions to remove the witchcraft from the afflicted person's body. As historian Owen Davies noted, "Most cunning-folk employed a multi-pronged approach to curing witchcraft, using a combination of written charms, magic rituals, prayers and herbal medicines, thereby appealing to the physical, psychological and spiritual needs of the sick."

One of the best known means by which the cunning folk opposed witchcraft was through the use of witch bottles; ceramic bottles containing such items as urine, nails, hair and nail clippings which it was believed, when put together, would cause harm to the malevolent witch. Another commonly used method was to take the heart of an animal, and to pierce it with pins, to do harm to the witch, whilst other cunning folk preferred to make dolls of the witch out of rags and other materials and then pierce them with pins, again with the intention of inflicting physical harm on the witch, and breaking their bewitchment.

Amongst the common people who often went to the cunning folk for aid, these magical practitioners were seen as being very much distinct from witches; as Davies noted, to the average person "witches were evil but cunning-folk were useful". Some theologians and figures of Church authority nonetheless believed that the cunning-folk, in practising magic, were also, like the witches, following the Devil, a malevolent supernatural entity in Christian mythology. Such a viewpoint was not constrained to any one particular form of Christianity in this period, but was found amongst the Roman Catholic Church, the Anglican Church of England and also various forms of Protestantism. Some early Quakers, a Protestant denomination founded in the seventeenth century, were particularly vocal against the cunning folk, perhaps because they themselves were accused by their critics of using sorcery to attract new members, and so wanted to heavily distance themselves from such practices.

=== Locating property and criminals ===
The cunning folk were also commonly employed to locate missing or stolen property and uncover the perpetrator: this was of particular importance throughout the Early Modern period, when peoples' possessions were far more valued than in later centuries as they were expensive to replace, particularly for the poor. There are recorded cases where the cunning folk would also promise to ensure that the stolen property was returned, and in some of these they did prove successful, with the thief promptly returning what they had taken, something which may have been out of their own fear of being cursed by the cunning folk. At times, such cunning individuals were also known to locate missing persons: an example of this was reported in 1617, as John Redman of Sutton discovered that his wife had left him, and "went from wizard to wizard, or, as they term them 'wise men', to have them bring her again".

The methods used to perform this service differed amongst the cunning folk, although astrology was one of the most commonly used ways. In some cases, the cunning man or woman would instead get their client to give them a list of names of people whom they suspected of having stolen their property, and from which they would use various forms of divination to come to a conclusion regarding who was the guilty party, or alternately they would get their client to scry with a reflective surface such as a mirror, crystal ball, piece of glass or bowl of water, and then allow them to see an image of the culprit themselves. According to historian Owen Davies, this was an "alternative, less risky strategy" than divination or astrology because it allowed the client to confirm "their own suspicions without cunning-folk having to name someone explicitly." Other techniques could be described by today's standards as psychological or even downright deceptive. Cunning folk might use these methods to "intimidate the guilty" or "prompt their clients into identifying criminal suspects"; for example cunning woman Alice West would hide in a closet near the front door and eavesdrop on small-talk before greeting a client, then upon meeting the client she would explain that already knew their business because the fairies told her.

The concept of cunning folk locating criminals using magical means concerned some people in power in England, and there are records from London in the fourteenth century showing that certain cunning folk themselves were brought to trial because of their accusations against other members of the community: for instance, in 1382 a cunning man named Robert Berewold was brought to court after accusing a woman named Johanna Wolsy of stealing a drinking bowl from a house in St Mildred Poultry. In the trial, it emerged that Berewold had come to his conclusion through a form of divination known as "turning the loaf" where a wooden peg was stuck into the top of a loaf of bread with four knives then stuck into the sides. A list of names would then be spoken, and according to the theory, the loaf would supposedly turn when the name of the thief was spoken. Berewold was found guilty of making unsubstantiated and damaging claims, and punished in the pillory.

=== Healing ===
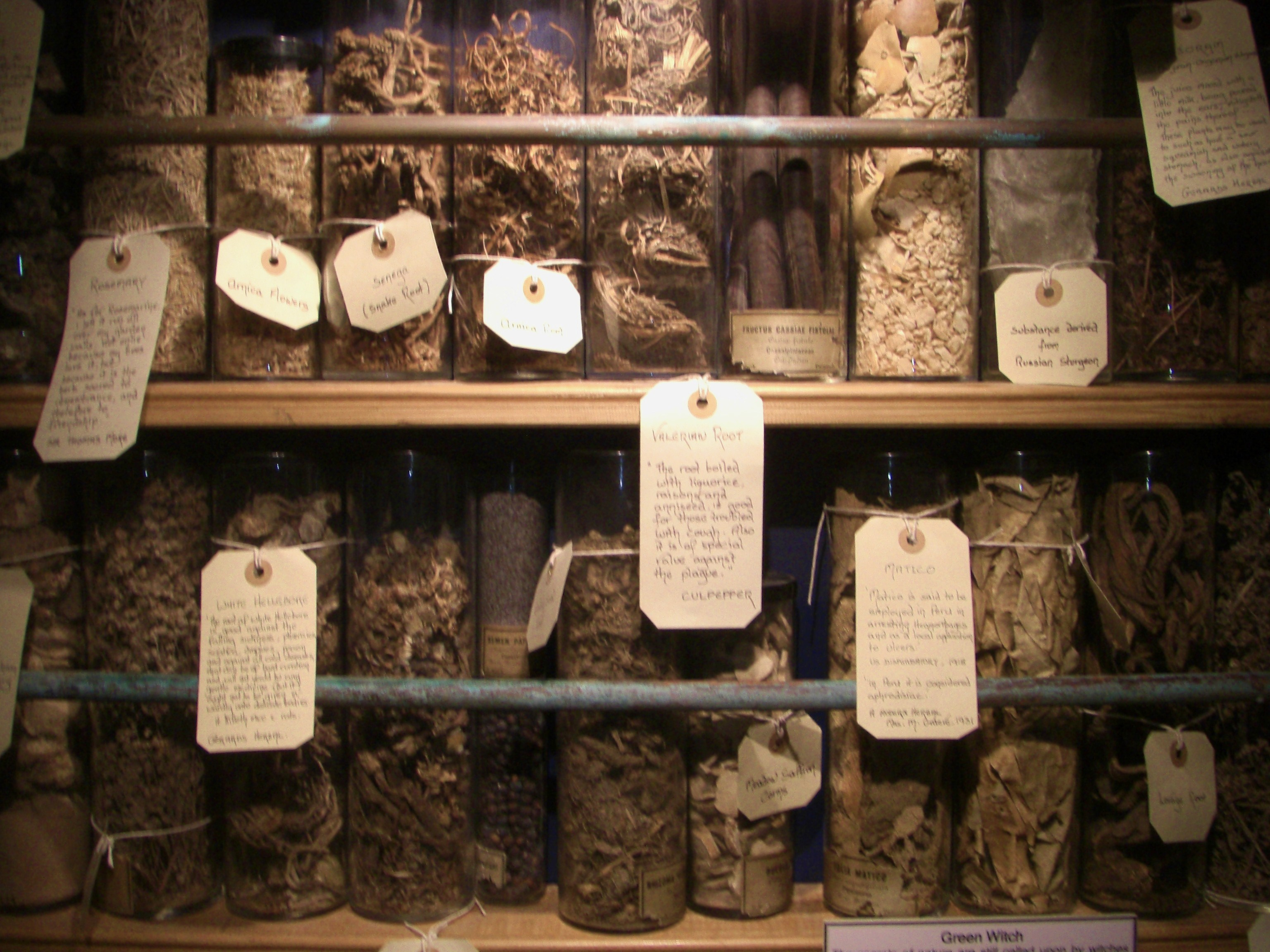
A variety of herbs and other floral ingredients that British cunning folk used in preparing potions and other healing concoctions

The cunning folk were widely visited for aid in healing various ailments for both humans and their livestock, particularly from poorer members of the community who could not afford the fees charged by apothecaries and physicians. Records indicate that the cunning folk used a wide variety of different methods to cure their clients, "from the simply laying on of hands to the use of elaborate rituals."

In 1846, the Chelmsford Chronicle reported that an ill young man, that physicians had been unable to help, followed the advice of a cunning woman who resided between the Epping Forest and Ongar, Essex to cure his illness:

That a small nut should be cut in twain, the kernel extracted, and a live spider placed in the shell, which was to be sewn up in a bag and worn round his neck, and as the spider wasted, so would the fever leave him.

At times, they would use various herbs and plants to develop medicines and folk cures that they believed would help. At other times, they employed more overtly magical means, such as the use of charms and prayers, which were usually very much Christian in nature, commonly invoking the power of the Christian Trinity to heal the sick. In keeping with this Christian basis, sometimes religious objects like holy water, candle wax or Eucharist wafers were used in healing. On occasion, live animals would be used as a part of the treatment, for instance in 1604, the Northumberland cunning women Katherine Thompson and Anne Nevelson were convicted by a court for placing a duck's beak to a woman's mouth whilst reciting charms as a form of healing.

Cunning folk at times were also known to offer abortions, usually via a poisonous potion that would kill the foetus, but there were cases where the potion also made the pregnant woman very ill.

=== Other services ===
British cunning folk would also often be involved in love magic, offering services pertaining to sex and relationships. One form of this was a form of fortune telling where they would divine the name or appearance of a client's future lover, often using palmistry, scrying or astrology. Another popular practice of the cunning folk was the casting of spells or charms to ensure a spouse's fidelity, preventing them from committing adultery; for instance, a cunning man from Newcastle upon Tyne, Peter Banks, was charged in 1673–74 with offering to draw up a magical contract which would bind a husband to staying loyal to his wife for a year.

Some cunning folk claimed to have the ability to locate treasure, and at times were employed by people in this capacity. In some of these cases it was believed that a supernatural entity, such as a demon, spirit or fairy, was guarding the hidden treasure, and that a cunning practitioner was needed to overcome them using magical means.

There were also claims that certain cunning folk occasionally performed bewitching or cursing for a fee, which under some definitions would make them witches as well as cunning people. The folklorist Eric Maple, after examining several 19th-century cunning folk in Essex, noted that one of them, George Pickingill, also performed cursing for clients, but that the other whom he examined, James Murrell, considered it immoral and so did not. Indeed, other Essex cunning folk were associated with witchcraft, notably in the village of Sible Hedingham, where there lived an elderly French cunning man who had previously had his tongue cut out, and was consequently dumb, as well as being deaf. As a result he was known as "Dummy" in the local community, who generally disliked him, largely because of his 'otherness' in being both foreign and disabled, and rumours spread that he was a witch who would curse them. In 1863 a drunken mob attacked him, throwing him in a river to see if he would sink or float (a traditional method of identifying a witch, who it was believed would float, whereas an innocent would sink), but the resulting shock killed the elderly man, who was in his eighties. Another notable case of a cunning person performing cursing and malevolent witchcraft comes from nineteenth-century Norwich, where a wise woman who went by the pseudonym of "Virtue" used to demand gifts from her neighbours, threatening them with cursing if they refused.

== Magical beliefs and praxes ==
As historian Willem de Blécort noted, "the different services the [cunning-folk] provided did not form part of an overall 'magic' system". Indeed, whilst the magical practices of the cunning folk were typically folk magical in content, there were also those who dabbled in ceremonial magic, or "high magic", based primarily on what they had gleaned from books of magic, or grimoires.

=== Spellcasting and charms ===
The cunning folk often produced written charms for their clients, which would be used in many ways, such as to protect from witchcraft or to help procure love. These typically contained a series of words that were believed to have magical powers, and which were commonly drawn either from grimoires or from the Bible. These might be produced on paper, which was the cheaper option, or, in certain cases, parchment, which according to certain magical texts should have been made from the skin of a virgin or unborn calf. "Most written charms contained a strong religious content", typically invoking various names of God (such as Elohim, Adonai, Tetragrammaton etc) or of His angels to help the particular charm to be effective. In some cases they quoted whole sections from the Bible, sometimes in either Latin, Greek or Hebrew rather than the vernacular English. Or they used "magic" words, such as "Abracadabra" or the palindrome "sator arepo tenet opera rotas". Such charms were then sometimes sewn into a bag, or placed within a bottle, and either carried about by the client or placed somewhere in their home.

In the 19th century, a ritual known as the toad bone rite became popular, particularly in East Anglia but also in other areas of the country, amongst both cunning folk and members of magical organisations such as the Scottish Society of the Horseman's Word and the East Anglian Society of Horsemen. Originally based upon an ancient southern European magical practice documented by Pliny, it had later been purported in the works of Cornelius Agrippa and Reginald Scot, which were read by several literate cunning folk. Although there were many variations, the ritual typically involved the killing of a toad or frog, having its flesh stripped from the bones by ants, and then throwing the bone into a stream at night. It was believed that this would grant the practitioner, who was known as a Toad Man, the ability to perform certain magical tasks.

=== Grimoires ===
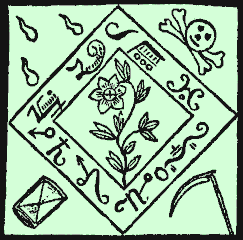
An amulet design contained within the Black Pullet grimoire

When printed books on the occult, particularly in the English language, had begun to be produced, some cunning folk obtained, and used, grimoires, or books of magic. In many cases they made a big show of the fact that they owned such tomes, which would have appeared impressive in the minds of many of their customers in a period where only a minority of people were able to read and write in Britain. Indeed, some cunning folk appeared to own these grimoires purely for cosmetic reasons, to impress their clients, and did not actually make use of any of the magical rituals contained within them.

Whilst grimoires had been around in Europe since the ancient period, and many new grimoires had been produced during the Medieval, they had remained highly expensive and hand written items that the average person would not have had access to. In the Early Modern period, this began to change as the invention of printing allowed grimoires to be produced in greater numbers; initially this had primarily been in languages other than English, particularly Latin, but in the mid-sixteenth century, English translations of Albertus Magnus' Book of Secrets were produced, whilst the printing of English-language grimoires increased in the seventeenth century. Another significant grimoire to be published in English was James Freake's translation of Cornelius Agrippa's Three Books of Occult Philosophy, which "must have generated a good deal of interest among [the cunning folk] and other less well-educated magical practitioners at the time." Equally popular was the English astrologer Robert Turner's translation of the Fourth Book of Occult Philosophy (1655), which was erroneously attributed to having been written by Agrippa.

However, perhaps "the most influential vehicle for the dissemination of high magic to a wider audience was, in fact, Reginald Scot's Discoverie of Witchcraft", a book first published in the early seventeenth century in which Scot condemned the cunning folk as liars and tricksters, but in which he had also provided a wide variety of talismans, charms and rituals as examples of what the cunning folk and ceremonial magicians used and performed. This book was subsequently republished on several occasions, and copies were obtained by a wide variety of cunning craft practitioners who used the information in the work to enhance their own magical praxes.

=== Familiar spirits and Fairyland ===
Some cunning folk were said to employ supernatural entities known as familiar spirits to aid them in their practice of magic. These spirits, which were also believed to work for witches as well, are referenced in many of the witch trial records from the Early Modern period. After examining these accounts, historian Emma Wilby noted how in the descriptions given of familiar spirits by both cunning folk and those accused of witchcraft, there was "a pervading sense of naturalism", with most familiars resembling "relatively ordinary humans or animals with only slight, if any, visual anomalies." For instance, folklorist Eric Maple noted that in the English region of East Anglia during the latter nineteenth century, it was commonly thought that familiar spirits, which were often referred to as "imps" in that region, took the form of white mice. There were however some exceptions to these naturalistic familiars, for instance a woman in Cambridgeshire was believed to have a familiar spirit that was a cross between a frog and a rat.

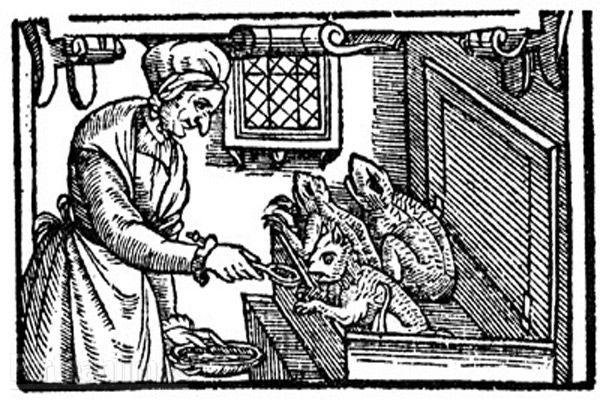
A late sixteenth-century English illustration of a witch feeding her familiars. The use of the familiar was something that witches and cunning folk were believed to have in common.

Wilby identified many similarities between the familiars recorded as serving cunning folk and those serving witches, with a general, though by no means universal, attribution of cunning folk's familiars with being benevolent and helping people, whilst those belonging to witches were more often thought of as being malevolent and causing harm. Again, in general the former were often referred to as "fairies" and the latter as "demons". Wilby noted how both British cunning folk and witches often described similar scenarios for how they had first encountered their familiar: most prominent of these was the claim that the familiar had simply appeared spontaneously whilst they went about their everyday activities, whilst other claims held that the witch or cunning person had inherited it from another magical practitioner, who was usually a family member, or that they had been given it by a more powerful spirit. The magical practitioner and the familiar then set about establishing a working relationship, sometimes solidified in a pact.

At times, the familiar spirit was believed to take the cunning person on a visionary journey to a place called Elfhame (literally meaning "elf-home"), which is now often referred to as Fairyland. In these trips, the cunning folk's soul was typically believed to go with their familiar on a journey into a hill, within which they would find a great subterranean fairy hall. In the hall, they would find a company of fairies, led by a king and queen, and would take part in feasting, drinking and dancing. Wilby connected the cunning folk's trip to Fairyland with the witches' believed trip to the sabbat meeting, which she also believed was a visionary journey. She accepted the theory, based upon the ideas of earlier historians such as Carlo Ginzburg and Éva Pócs, that the concept of the Witches' Sabbath was developed through the Christian demonising of earlier pre-Christian concepts of the visit to Fairyland.

Historian Ronald Hutton remarked that "It is quite possible that pre-Christian mythology lies behind this tradition" of a belief in familiar spirits. Such an idea was supported by Wilby, who compared the accounts of familiar spirits in Britain with anthropological and ethnographic accounts of helper spirits given by shamans in both Siberia and North America. Noting a wide range of similarities between the two, she came to the conclusion that British belief in familiars must have been a surviving remnant of earlier animistic and shamanic beliefs in the pre-Christian religions of the island.

=== Christian elements ===
"I do conjure, constrain, adjure, and command you spirits. Analaya, Analla, Anacar, in the name of the Father, and of the Son, and of the Holy Ghost, by Alpha and Omega, the Beginning and the End, by the general resurrection, and by Him who shall come to judge the quick and the dead, and the world by fire, and, by the general resurrection at the last day, and by that name that is called Tetragrammaton, that you cause the person who stole the goods in question to bring back the same."

— A conjuration found in the papers of Joseph Railey in 1857, displaying the overt Christian content of much of the cunning folk's work.

Britain throughout the late medieval and Early Modern periods was an almost entirely Christian society (with the only exception being a small Jewish population), although during this period there was a gradual shift from adherence to Roman Catholicism to forms of Anglicanism and Protestantism following the English Reformation in the sixteenth century. It was because of this that the cunning folk operating in this era typically worked within a Christian framework and world view.

This Christian influence was evident in much of their magical praxes. For instance, the historian Owen Davies believed that the written charms supplied by cunning folk displayed the "intrinsic Christian content of [their] magic" and the influence of mystical and magical words taken from the Bible. Historian Ronald Hutton concurred with this assessment, remarking that "Looking at the recorded charms dispensed by magical practitioners, it is obvious that many – perhaps the majority – are Christian in character. They quote from the Bible, or appeal to the Trinity, or to Jesus, or to saints. In most cases, to be sure, they are using the trappings and symbols of Christianity with little regard to what the churchmen would have regarded as its essence; the Bible ... This is, however, a large part of what popular Christianity had always been about, and something that had caused learned and devout members of the faith to tear their hair at intervals ever since the time of the Church Fathers."

In keeping with the general population of the time, there were those cunning folk who were little more than nominal in their Christian belief as well as those that were devout. This was illustrated by historian James Obelkevitch in his examination of nineteenth-century popular religion in the southern part of the Lincolnshire chalk hills, when he note that the three main cunning people of the area, whilst each holding to a Christian worldview, each had different particular religious attachment. One of these, "Fiddler" Fynes, regularly attended church services and was an essentially conventional Christian for that period, whilst the second, John Worsdale of Lincoln, was similarly devout but was unconventional in that he rejected the need for a professional clergy. The third, Stainton of Louth, believed in a Christian theology and cosmology, but saw little point in worshipping the Christian God because he felt that in working with magic, "the Devil has hold" of him.

Although some twentieth and twenty-first century Neopagan authors, such as Rae Beth, have claimed that the British cunning folk were followers of a surviving, pre-Christian "pagan" religion, this is something rejected by historians. As Ronald Hutton noted, whilst there was pagan influences in some folk magical charms and a possible connection through the belief in familiar spirits, there is "no known case of a cunning person or a charmer calling upon a pagan deity."

== History ==
=== Medieval period ===
In England during the early medieval period, various forms of folk magic could be found amongst the Anglo-Saxons, who referred to such practitioners as wicca (male) or wicce (female), or at times also as dry, practitioners of drycraeft, the latter of which have been speculated as being anglicised terms for the Irish drai, a term referring to druids, who appeared as anti-Christian sorcerers in much Irish literature of the period. Some of the spells and charms that had been used in the Anglo-Saxon pagan era continued to be used following Christianization. However, as historian Owen Davies noted, "although some such pre-Christian magic continued, to label it pagan is to misrepresent the people who used it and the context in which it was used."

The extent to which elements from pre-Christian pagan religions influenced the cunning folk is debatable. Owen Davies believed that "few historical insights are to be gained from seeking an archaic or shamanic lineage for cunning-folk." Such a claim has subsequently been challenged by Emma Wilby, who has put forward the case that the belief in familiar spirits, and the visionary journeys into Fairyland that sometimes accompanied them, were survivals from "pre-Christian animism".

=== Early Modern period ===
==== England and Wales ====
In England and Wales, which were politically united by the Laws in Wales Acts 1535 and 1542, cunning folk had operated throughout the latter part of the medieval and into the Early Modern period. In the fifteenth and sixteenth centuries, there had been no attempt to illegalise the cunning craft, although private lawsuits had been brought against some of them by those clients who felt that they had been cheated out of their money. This changed with the Witchcraft Act 1541, enacted under the reign of Henry VIII, which targeted both witches and cunning folk, and which prescribed the death penalty for such crimes as using invocations and conjurations to locate treasure or to cast a love spell. This law was repealed no later than 1547, under the reign of Henry's son Edward VI, something that the historian Owen Davies believed was due to those in power changing their opinion on the law: they believed that either the death penalty was too harsh for such crimes or that the practice of the cunning craft was a moral issue that was better for the Church to deal with in ecclesiastic courts rather than a problem that had to be sorted out by the state.

For the following few decades, the magical practices of the cunning folk remained legal, despite opposition from certain religious authorities. It was a time of great religious upheaval in the country as Edward's successor, his sister Mary I, reintroduced Roman Catholicism, before Anglicanism was once again reimposed under Elizabeth I. In 1563, after the return of power to the Anglican Church of England, a bill was passed by parliament designed to illegalise "Conjurations, Enchantments and Witchcrafts", again being aimed at both the alleged witches and the cunning folk. However, this law was not as harsh as its earlier predecessor, with the death penalty being reserved for those who were believed to have conjured an evil spirit or murdered someone through magical means, whilst those for whom the use of magic was a first offence faced a year's imprisonment and four stints in the pillory. Nonetheless, this law would have little effect on the cunning folk, as "the attention and focus of the courts shifted away from the activities of cunning-folk and towards the maleficium of supposed witches" – the Witch Hunt that had been raging in Scotland and in many parts of continental Europe had finally arrived in England.

Whilst across England, many people were accused of witchcraft by members of their local communities and put on trial, the cunning folk very rarely suffered a similar fate. It was unusual for a cunning man or woman to actually be accused of witchcraft; in the county of Essex for instance, whereas around four hundred people had been put on trial for witchcraft, only four of those were identifiably cunning folk. However, many of the professional witch-hunters and theologians continued to proclaim the cunning craft as being the same as witchcraft, with them both being caused by the Devil. One pamphlet published that espoused these views claimed that the cunning folk should be "most cruelly executed: for that no punishment can bee [sic] thought upon, be it never so high a degree of torment, which may be deemed sufficient for such a divelish [sic] and danable [sic] practise." Their views however were not supported by the general population, who continued to see a distinct difference between witchcraft and cunning craft, with the witch-hunter John Stearne, an associate of Matthew Hopkins, remarking that whilst he and Hopkins wanted to prosecute the cunning folk, they could not because "men rather uphold them, and say, why should any man be questioned for doing good."

Meanwhile, the idea of the cunning folk began to appear in the literature of the period. In 1638, the playwright Thomas Heywood published his comedy, The Wise Woman of Hogsdon, whilst in 1684 another playwright, Edward Ravenscroft, published his own play about a cunning woman. With the decline in the witch trials in the latter part of the seventeenth and early eighteenth centuries, partly due to the rise of the Enlightenment amongst the educated elite, a new law was introduced, the Witchcraft Act 1735. Unlike earlier laws, this did not accept the existence of magic, and was designed to be used to prosecute those who claimed magical powers as being fraudulent; it could therefore be very damaging to the cunning profession. The new regulations imposed by the Witchcraft Act 1735 laid down a maximum penalty of a year's imprisonment for the crime of deceiving people by claiming magical powers, but in effect, during the rest of the eighteenth century, there were very few prosecutions, with most authorities not bothering to enforce this particular law.

==== Scotland ====
Throughout the Early Modern period, Scotland remained a distinct political entity from England and Wales, having its own independent government and monarchy. However, like the rest of Britain, it also saw cunning folk operating within its borders.

A 1932 article by Lewis Spence in The Weekly Scotsman, responding to the popularisation of Margaret Murray's Witch-cult hypothesis, stated that "the Saxon word 'wicca', a witch, as well as the term 'carline' were of immemorial usage" in lowland Scotland while in the highlands, where English words were less known, 'wise women' or "Nicnevins" ("daughters of heaven") were used. Spence argued that a native tradition had "flourished" in Scotland, and elsewhere in Britain, and, while it maintained many differences, had been greatly influenced by French practices from the mid-fifteenth century and this saw the introduction of the word 'witch'. While still associating folk tradition with 'witchcraft' he suggested it was "a widespread cult of pagan origin, having a well-digested system of medical and magical lore of its own, a distant ritual, and with affiliations throughout the whole of the Lowlands and a certain part of the Highlands".

=== 19th and 20th centuries ===
By the 19th century, Scotland had been politically united with England, Wales and also Ireland as the United Kingdom of Great Britain and Ireland, controlled by a central government in London. Such a political union also brought about an increase in cultural diffusion and unity between the various nations. It was in nineteenth-century Scotland that an agricultural organisation that acted as both a trade union and a magical fraternity known as the Society of the Horseman's Word was founded. Its members, whilst not being cunning folk, practised folk magic, and soon an English alternative, the Society of Horsemen, had also been founded. The spread of such magical groups and their ideas could be seen in the diffusion of the toad bone rite, which was used by such horseman's groups and various cunning folk, and examples of which could be found scattered across Britain, from Nevern in Pembrokeshire, Wales, to East Anglia in England.

At the start of the 19th century, the popularity of cunning folk continued, and there was still a large and lucrative market for their services, for instance in 1816, there were eight different wise women working independently in the English coastal town of Whitby. Nonetheless, the 19th century also saw an increase in the numbers of those cunning folk being prosecuted under the Witchcraft Act 1735, possibly because "members of the social elite came to perceive that a faith in magic [far from having been eradicated as they had hoped,] seemed to be as prevalent among the populace as it had been a hundred years before, even while a growing political turbulence among commoners gave their rulers a new interest in the idea of education and civility as stabilizing forces." Soon after this, in 1824, a new law commonly referred to as the Vagrancy Act 1824 was introduced, bringing about a further blow to the cunning profession by outlawing "persons pretending or professing to tell fortunes, or using any subtle craft, means and device, by palmistry or otherwise, to deceive and impose." The enacting of the law led to the increased prosecutions of cunning folk, something that would only begin to wane in the 1910s.

A news report from 1870 detailed a number of cases brought before authorities in the nineteenth century where claims of powers were made, but it ridiculed the belief, and closed with an example where 'the charge was settled down to the more definite one of obtaining a shilling under false pretenses'.

By the beginning of the 20th century, the number of cunning folk across Britain had dropped markedly from that of a century before, and by the 1940s they had essentially vanished from the country. Despite this, other professional practitioners of popular magic, such as astrologers and fortune tellers, continued to remain popular. The historian Owen Davies believed that the primary reason for the decline in the cunning craft was the declining belief in the existence of malevolent witchcraft in the country (something brought about by modernisation and increasing education and literacy rates), and therefore the collapse of any need for the anti-witchcraft measures that the cunning folk offered as their primary service. Whilst many of their magical practices continued to be used, being performed by folk and ceremonial magicians or being absorbed into new religious movements that used magic such as Wicca, Davies concluded that the actual profession itself died out. Historian Ronald Hutton however believed that it was more accurate to state that the cunning craft, rather than dying out, "changed character" by being absorbed into other magical currents. The decline of the cunning craft in Britain was not however indicative of other European nations: in Italy for example, cunning practitioners continued operating right into the early 21st century.

== Legacy ==
=== Modern occultists ===
Some of the magical practices and charms of the cunning-folk were passed down and continued to be used after the decline of the profession, although because they were no longer typically used to fight malevolent witchcraft in a professional sense, historian Owen Davies did not believe that those who practised them could be accurately seen as cunning-folk. As he noted:

How many contemporary white-witches regularly practice both thief magic and unbewitching on a commercial basis? A self-styled wise-woman today who does not deal with bewitched clients is not a wise-woman as defined historically. [Malevolent] Witchcraft was the glue that held the concept of cunning-folk together... This is not to belittle the role of modern magical healers. They continue to provide relief and comfort to people, just as cunning-folk did. Rather, it is an attempt to clarify where they really stand in relation to those formerly described as cunning-folk. People who refer to themselves as such ought to be fully aware of their relationship to their historical namesakes, and be aware of the conceptual and social differences that separate them.

He noted that many of those currently referring to themselves as cunning-folk, wise women, white witches and the like during the 1990s and 2000s were explicitly Neopagan in their faith, which influenced their magical workings. He also noted that many of them referred to themselves as "hedge witches", a term that was first developed by the writer Rae Beth in her book Hedge Witch: A Guide to Solitary Witchcraft (1990). Beth explicitly stated that the magical practices that she was purporting were the original practices of the cunning-folk, but she had incorrectly connected them to ancient paganism and the Witch-Cult. This was something Davies criticised, stating that:

[T]here is still a considerable gulf between hedge witches and cunning-folk, not only in relation to the unbewitching trade, but also from a religious point of view. Cunning-folk were essentially Christian. Whether conscientious churchgoers or not, they employed the Bible and Christian rites and rituals. Hedge witches, on the other hand, are mostly [Neo]pagans in some form or other. They worship nature and have an animistic conception of the physical environment. This, in turn, is mirrored in the content of the spells and charms they use.

Historian Ronald Hutton noted that the low magic of the cunning folk was one of the lesser influences upon the development of the Neopagan religion of Wicca and related witchcraft-based groups in the early twentieth century. For instance, one of the pioneering English Neopagan Witches, Robert Cochrane, who would describe himself under such titles as "pellar" and who led a coven known as the Clan of Tubal Cain in the early 1960s, allegedly incorporated elements borrowed from the cunning craft in his tradition, known as Cochrane's Craft. Indeed, Shani Oates, one of his later followers, claimed that his tradition "preserves many elements of 19th century cunning and folk magics". Hutton however also noted that although many Neopagan witches consider themselves to be the heirs of the cunning people, they "have much more in common with the stereotypical images of witches in nineteenth-century popular culture; the very beings who were regarded as the natural enemies of the charmers and cunning people."

=== Historiography ===
Whilst the historian Keith Thomas had touched upon the subject of English popular magic in his Religion and the Decline of Magic (1971), in a 1994 article on the subject of the cunning folk, the historian Willem de Blécourt stated that the study of the subject, "properly speaking, has yet to start." These ideas were echoed in 1999, when the historian Ronald Hutton, in his The Triumph of the Moon: A History of Modern Pagan Witchcraft, remarked that the study of the cunning folk and European folk magic was "notoriously, an area that has been comparatively neglected by academic scholars." Nonetheless, articles on the subject were published in the late 1990s, primarily by the historian Owen Davies, who in 2003 published Cunning-Folk: Popular Magic in English History (which was later republished under the altered title of Popular Magic: Cunning-folk in English History in 2007). This was followed in 2005 with the publication of Emma Wilby's Cunning Folk and Familiar Spirits: Shamanistic Visionary Traditions in Early Modern British Witchcraft and Magic, which took an attitude to the cunning craft somewhat different from those of Hutton and Davies, emphasising a spiritual dimension to the magic of the cunning folk complementary to - and underpinning - its more practical aspects.

There are also examples of academic studies into specific British cunning folk. In 1960, the folklorist Eric Maple published articles on two nineteenth-century cunning men in East Anglia, James Murrell and George Pickingill. In 2004, Jason Semmens published a study of a nineteenth-century Cornish cunning-woman as The Witch of the West: Or, The Strange and Wonderful History of Thomasine Blight.
