= Canewdon =

Village and civil parish in Essex, England

Coordinates: 51.616231°N 0.744367°E

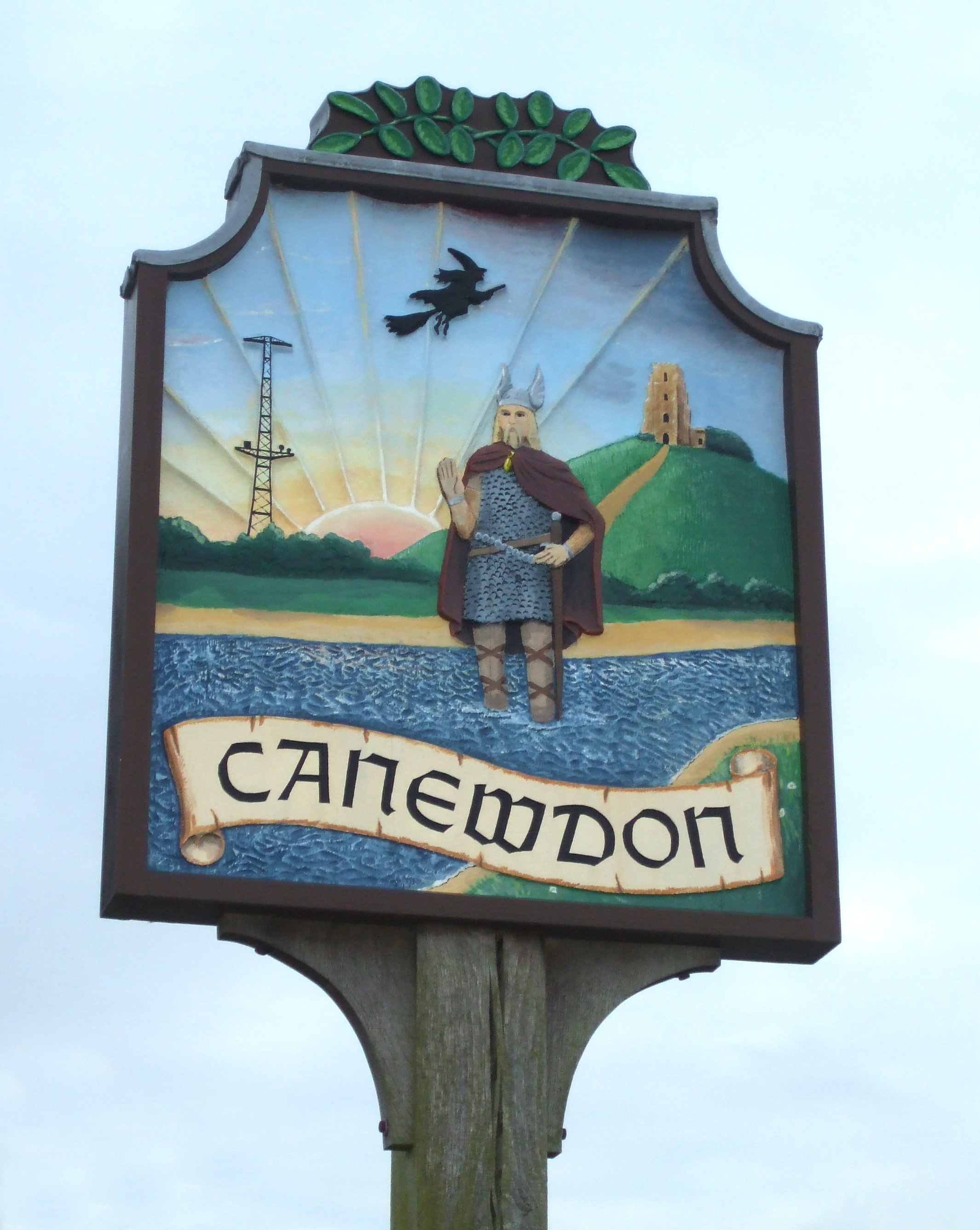
- Canewdon village sign, showing a witch, the church, a Viking, and the former radar tower

- Location within Essex
- Population: 1,656 (Parish, 2021)
- OS grid reference: TQ900945
- Civil parish: Canewdon
- District: Rochford
- Shire county: Essex
- Region: East
- Country: England
- Sovereign state: United Kingdom
- Post town: ROCHFORD
- Postcode district: SS4
- Dialling code: 01702
- Police: Essex
- Fire: Essex
- Ambulance: East of England
- UK Parliament: Rayleigh

Canewdon is a village and civil parish in the Rochford district of Essex, England. The village is located approximately 4 miles (6.4 km) northeast of the town of Rochford, while the parish extends for several miles on the southern side of the River Crouch. At the 2021 census the parish had a population of 1,656.

Canewdon is situated on one of the highest hills of the Essex coastline, from which St Nicholas's Church affords wide views of the Crouch estuary. East of the village lies the island of Wallasea, popular for sailing, and a wetland sanctuary for wildlife.

The name Canewdon is derived from Old English words meaning 'the hill of Cana's people' and not, as is sometimes claimed, from King Canute, who fought and won the Battle of Ashingdon nearby in 1016 against the English King Edmund Ironside.

== History ==
=== Early history ===
A number of sites in and around Canewdon reflect occupation of the land from at least the Neolithic period (4,000–2,000 BC). For instance, gravel extraction from early 20th century found prehistoric remains, such as a hoard of Neolithic axes and Iron Age. On display at the National Maritime Museum in Greenwich is a Bronze Age Canewdon paddle.

Canewdon's location was favourable for its vantage point and proximity to the sea for trading and salt production. From Prehistoric and Roman times farmsteads and cemeteries were located on higher ground. Roman urns were found in the village in 1712. Along the coast were Roman Red Hill salterns structures constructed of clay floors heated by flues, dating based upon Romano-British pottery. Salt was used in the ancient diet, for grazing animals, as a refining agent in metallurgy, for soldering and in dyes.

=== Medieval history ===
The name Canewdon is thought to predate the Danish King Canute by about 400 years, but the area is claimed to be the site of an ancient camp used by Canute during the Battle of Assandun nearby at Ashingdon, in the course of his successful invasion of Essex in 1016. Remains of Canute's camp are thought to be marked in the entrenchments between the village and the river.

The name Canewdon is derived from the Old English 'hill of Cana's people,' first documented in the Domesday Book of 1086 as Carenduna, at a time when there were 28 households. Swein of Essex, son of Robert FitzWimarc, Sheriff of Essex between 1066 and 1086, was the principal landholder of the Rochford area. Canewdon Hall, a fortified mansion and the focus for the medieval settlement, was demolished in 1966. Canewdon Hall Close was built on the site.

=== Modern history ===
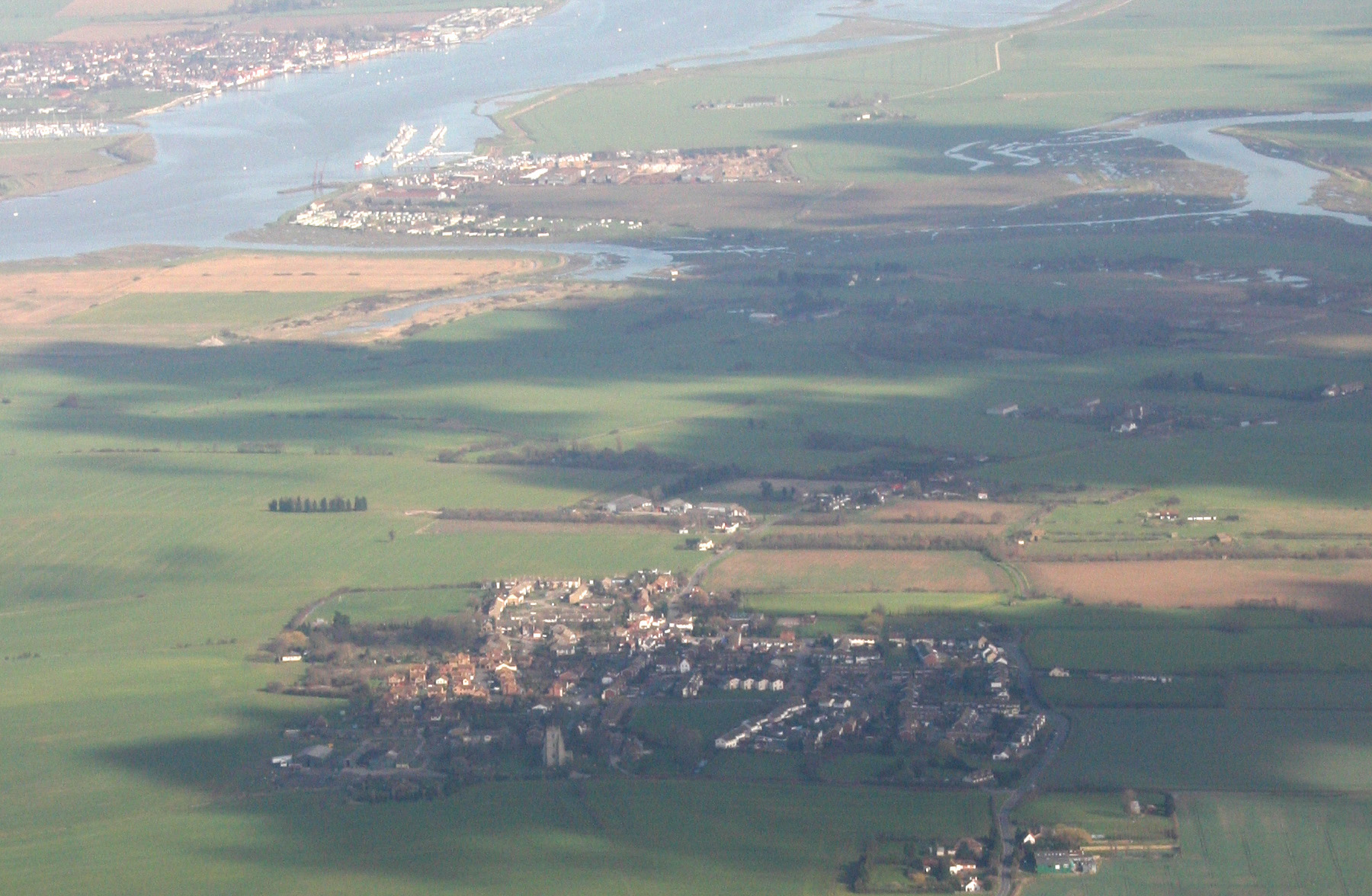
Aerial Photo of Canewdon

The local economy, based on coastal industries, agriculture and the brick industry, declined during the latter 19th century. The 19th-century population fluctuated accordingly: in 1801 the population was 569, rose to 723 in 1841, and declined to 495 in 1901.

Agnes Frances Whitwell (née Morley), originally from Canewdon, was killed in 1915 by a bomb dropped by a Zeppelin, which landed on her home at 120 North Road, Southend-on-Sea.

Fearing war with Germany, in 1937 Royal Air Force (RAF) Canewdon was one of four radar sites established to test the use of Chain Home Transmission and Receiver radar sites around the coast to detect enemy aircraft and estimate their range. The final twenty sites were critical in the defence against German aircraft during the Second World War. Information from the Chain Home sites and observation posts were transmitted via underground telephone lines to a central plotting room for probable raid analysis and warning notification.

The Canewdon Chain Home radar tower was relocated to nearby Great Baddow in 1956, where it can still be seen. Bunkers that protected it remain in Canewdon.

The later part of the 20th century brought residential development, including the building of a model village in the 1960s in the southwest. The 2001 census reported 588 households and a population of 1,477 people in Canewdon.

== Church ==
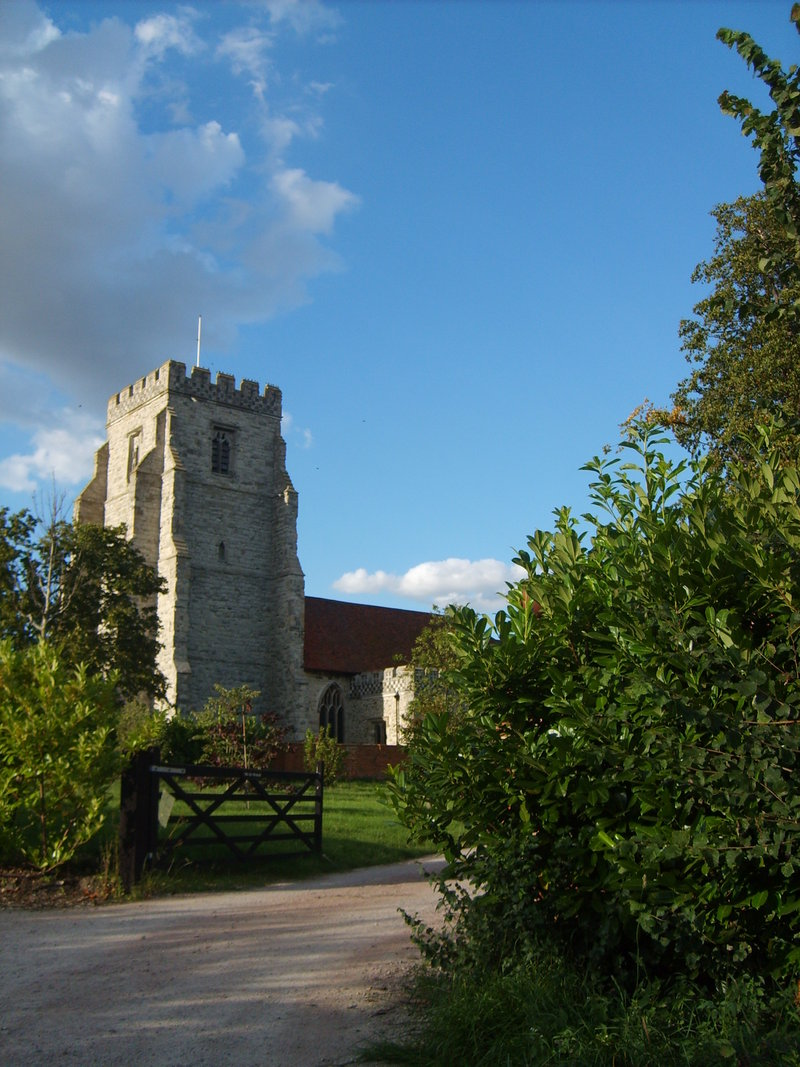
St Nicholas's Church

The 14th-century Parish Church of St Nicholas at the end of the village High Street stands on a ridge overlooking the River Crouch. Its impressive 15th-century tower, a landmark for many miles, is said to have been erected by Henry V following his victory at the Battle of Agincourt in France. During the reign of Queen Elizabeth I the tower was used as a navigation point along the River Crouch. During the First World War the tower was used for observation and as a signalling post. The old village lock-up and stocks are located to the east of the church.

The church is a Grade II* listed building.

== Legends of witchcraft and ghosts ==
George Pickingill (1816–1909) who lived in the village during the late 19th century, was said to practise as a cunning man. However these claims have been debunked by a number of sources.

The earliest written accusation of witchcraft appears to be that of Rose Pye, a spinster who in 1580 was said to be living as a witch and responsible for bewitching to death in August 1575 Johanna Snow or Johanne Snowe, a 12-month-old child from Scaldhurst Farm in Canewdon. The case went to court where Rose pleaded not guilty. Although acquitted, Rose remained and died in jail a few months after her acquittal. Five years later Cicely Makin was accused of witchcraft, and was unable to find five people who would swear that she was not a witch. After being given five years to mend her ways without success, Cicely was excommunicated from the church.

Author Ian Yearsley has written a novel based on the witchcraft legends in the village, called The Curse of Cannow's End (published in 2012). 'Cannow's End' is a loose anagram of 'Canewdon'. There is also a sequel, Return to Cannow's End (2017).

The British paranormal investigation show Most Haunted Live visited the village as part of their 2004 Easter weekend special of three nights of live investigation which aired on Living TV. They visited the village on their first night of Good Friday 9 April 2004.
