= Owen Davies (historian) =

British social historian

- Born: 26 August 1969 (age 57); Edenbridge, Kent, England, UK
- Education: Sondes Place Comprehensive School; Lancaster University
- Occupation: Professor in Social History
- Years active: 1999–present
- Employer: University of Hertfordshire

Owen Davies (born 1969) is a British historian who specialises in the history of magic, witchcraft, ghosts, and popular medicine. He is currently Professor in History at the University of Hertfordshire and has been described as Britain's "foremost academic expert on the history of magic".

== Early life and education ==
Reading Alan Garner as a child led Davies to be interested in magic. He studied archaeology and history at Cardiff University. He went on to a Ph.D at Lancaster University. Completed in 1995, Davies's thesis looked at the continuation and decline of popular belief in witchcraft and magic from the Witchcraft Act 1735 to the Fraudulent Mediums Act 1951 (1991–1994).

== Career ==
Davies has authored and edited 15 books and numerous research articles.

He has been a key collaborator in a number of large-scale historical research projects. From 2010 to 2015, Davies was Co-Investigator on 'Harnessing the Power of the Criminal Corpse', a Wellcome Trust funded project exploring "the meanings, treatment, and uses of the criminal corpse". Davies was also a Co-Investigator on the major Leverhulme-funded project 'Inner Lives: Emotions, Identity, and the Supernatural, 1300-1900'. Davies and University of Hertfordshire colleague Dr Ceri Houlbrook are currently Co-Investigators in 'Bottles Concealed and Revealed', an Arts & Humanities Research Council (AHRC) funded project investigating witch bottles.

Davies has been based at the University of Hertfordshire since the early 2000s. In 2019, he instigated a Folklore Studies MA at the University of Hertfordshire, which is currently the only academic qualification of its kind in England and Wales.

In 2020, Davies was elected President of the Folklore Society.

== Selected publications ==
- Davies, Owen (1999). A People Bewitched: Witchcraft and Magic in Nineteenth-Century Somerset. Bruton. ISBN 978-0-9536390-0-7. OCLC 44989636.
- Davies, Owen (1999). Witchcraft, magic and culture 1736-1951. Manchester University Press. ISBN 978-0-7190-5655-0. OCLC 41338629.
- Davies, Owen and Blécourt, Willem de (editors) (2004). Beyond the witch trials: witchcraft and magic in enlightenment Europe. Manchester: Manchester University Press. ISBN 978-0-7190-6660-3. OCLC 186315672.
- Davies, Owen and Blécourt, Willem de (editors) (2004). Witchcraft continued: popular magic in modern Europe. Manchester: Manchester University Press. ISBN 978-0-7190-6658-0. OCLC 784959128.
- Davies, Owen (2005). Murder, Magic, Madness: The Victorian Trials of Dove and the Wizard. Pearson Education. ISBN 978-0-582-89413-6. OCLC 63279021.
- Davies, Owen (2007). Popular Magic: Cunning-folk in English History. Hambledon Continuum. ISBN 978-1-84725-036-0. OCLC 85830157.
- Davies, Owen (2007). The Haunted: A Social History of Ghosts. New York: Palgrave Macmillan. ISBN 1-4039-3924-1. OCLC 145379850.
- Davies, Owen and Barry, Jonathan (editors) (2007) Palgrave advances in witchcraft historiography. Basingstoke [England]: Palgrave Macmillan. 2007. ISBN 978-1-4039-1175-9. OCLC 122702023.
- Davies, Owen (2009). Grimoires: A History of Magic Books. Oxford University Press USA. ISBN 978-0-19-920451-9. OCLC 244766270.
- Davies, Owen (editor) (2010) Ghosts: A Social History. London: Pickering & Chatto. 2010. ISBN 978-1-85196-989-0. OCLC 501394897.
- Davies, Owen (2011). Paganism: A Very Short Introduction. Oxford University Press. ISBN 978-0-1992-3516-2. OCLC 1023117514.
- Davies, Owen (2012). Magic: A Very Short Introduction. Oxford: Oxford University Press. ISBN 978-0-19-958802-2. OCLC 749871159.
- Davies, Owen (2013). America Bewitched: The Story of Witchcraft after Salem. Oxford. ISBN 978-0-19-957871-9. OCLC 812686039.
- Davies, Owen and Matteoni, Francesca (2017). Executing Magic in the Modern Era: Criminal Bodies and the Gallows in Popular Medicine. Cham: Springer International Publishing. ISBN 978-3-319-59518-4.
- Davies, Owen (editor) (2017) The Oxford Illustrated History of Witchcraft and Magic. Oxford, United Kingdom. ISBN 978-0-19-960844-7. OCLC 972537073.
- Davies, Owen (2018). A Supernatural War: Magic, Divination and Faith during the First World War. Oxford, United Kingdom. ISBN 0-19-879455-X. OCLC 1022082619.
