= Kate Cayley =

Canadian writer and theatre director

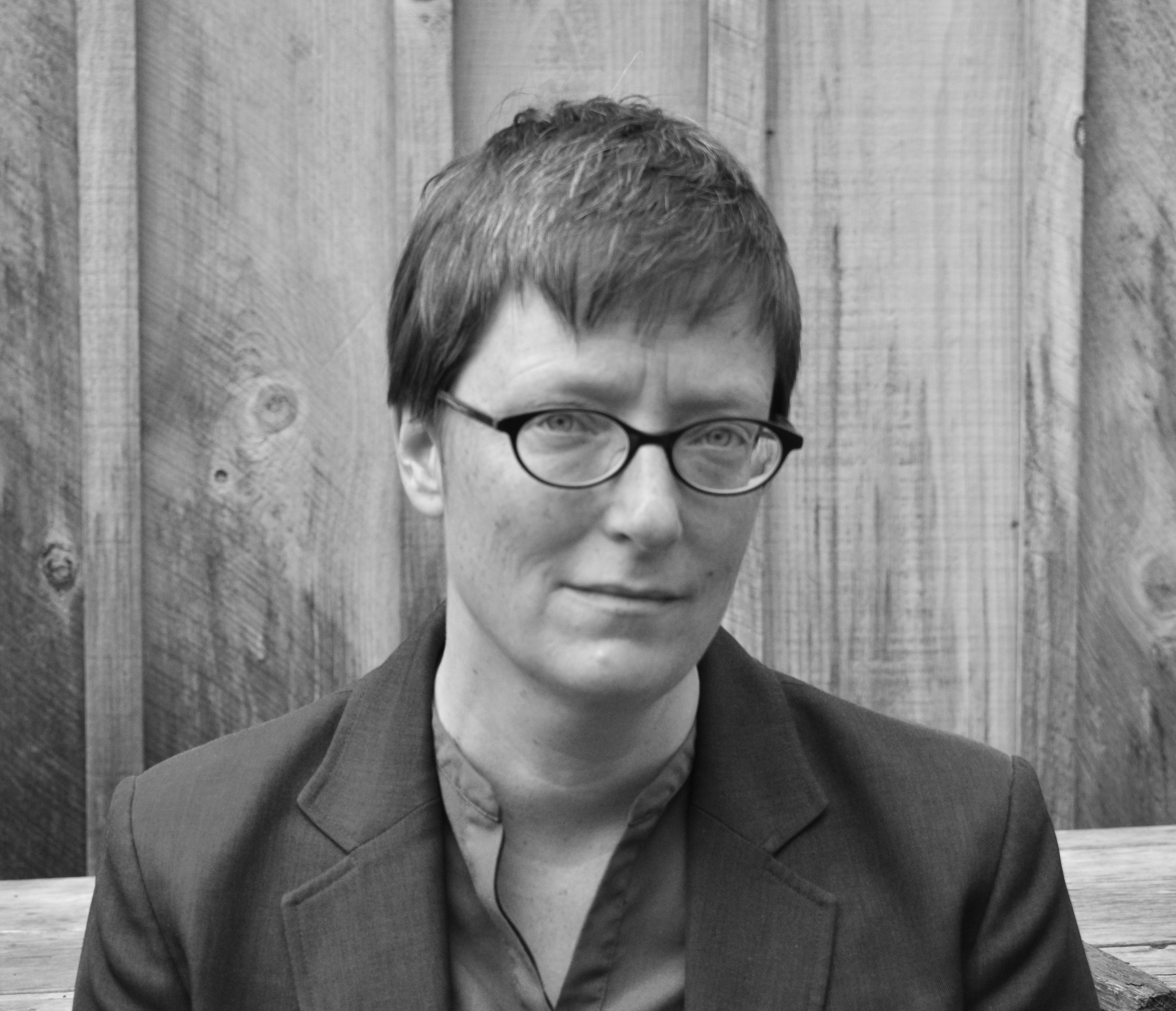
- Born: Ottawa, Ontario, Canada
- Occupations: Playwright, short story writer, poet, novelist, theatre director
- Writing career
- Notable works: After Akhmatova; The Hangman in the Mirror; How You Were Born; Property
- Notable awards: Geoffrey Bilson Award (2012); Trillium Book Award (2015); Mitchell Prize for Faith and Poetry (2021); Toronto Book Award (2026); Governor General's Award for English-language fiction (2026)
- Website: katecayley.ca

Kate Cayley is a Canadian writer and theatre director. She was the artistic director of Stranger Theatre and was playwright-in-residence at Toronto's Tarragon Theatre from 2009 to 2017.

As a playwright, her plays have included The Yellow Wallpaper Project, The Hanging of Françoise Laurent, The Clown of God, And What Alice Found There, The Counterfeit Marquise, After Akhmatova and The Bakelite Masterpiece.

== Awards ==
She won the Geoffrey Bilson Award in 2012 for her young adult novel The Hangman in the Mirror and the Trillium Book Award in 2015 for her short story collection How You Were Born. In 2021, she won the Mitchell Prize for Faith and Poetry.

She was shortlisted for a ReLit Award in 2014 for her poetry collection How This World Comes to an End, and for the Governor General's Award for English-language fiction at the 2015 Governor General's Awards for How You Were Born.

Her debut novel, Property, was shortlisted for the 2026 Amazon Canada First Novel Award, and won the Toronto Book Award and the Governor General's Award for English-language fiction.

== Works ==
=== Plays ===
- The Yellow Wallpaper Project (adapted from "The Yellow Wallpaper" by Charlotte Perkins Gilman)
- The Clown of God
- East of the Sun, West of the Moon (based on the fairy tale "East of the Sun and West of the Moon")
- The Counterfeit Marquise (adapted from "The Counterfeit Marquise" by Charles Perrault)
- And What Alice Found There (based on Alice's Adventures in Wonderland, Through the Looking-Glass, and other writings by Lewis Carroll)
- The World Turned Upside Down (adapted from the writings of Gerrard Winstanley and The World Turned Upside Down by Christopher Hill)
- The Hanging of Françoise Laurent (based on "Marrying the Hangman" by Margaret Atwood)
- The Bakelite Masterpiece
- After Akhmatova
- This is Nowhere
- The Archive of Missing Things

=== Poetry ===
- Other Houses (Brick Books 2017; OCLC 961929434)
- When This World Comes to an End (Brick Books 2013; OCLC 823506493)

=== Short stories ===
- Householders (Biblioasis 2021; OCLC 1240576635)
- How You Were Born (Pedlar Press 2014; OCLC 879529181)

=== Novels ===
- The Hangman in the Mirror (Annick Press 2011; OCLC 709668217)
- Property (Coach House Books 2025; OCLC 1499532974)
