= Bridget Hill =

Bridget Hill could refer to:

- Bridget Hill (historian) (1922–2002), British feminist historian
- Bridget Hill (politician), American lawyer and Attorney General of Wyoming
