= John Warr (radical) =

John Warr (fl. 1648-1656) was a 17th century protestant writer known for writing a series of radical pamphlets. Christopher Hill (1972) includes a whole chapter (C12) on John Warr and the Law, in his The World Turned Upside Down: Radical Ideas During the English Revolution. And Greaves & Zaller in their (1984) A Biographical Dictionary of British Radicals in the Seventeenth Century 3 Volumes include some more details.

C.S. Nicholl's The Dictionary of National Biography: Missing Persons has, on page 703, a useful summary of Warr.

Warr's pamphlets include:

- John Warr (1648) Administrations Civil and Spiritual in Two Treatises the first entitled The Dispute betwixt Equity and Form the other The Dispute Betwixt Form and Power, published by Giles Calvert
- John Warr (1649) The Privileges of the People or Principles of Common Right and Freedom (1649), published by Giles Calvert
- John Warr (1649) The Corruption and Deficiency of the Laws of England soberly discovered Or, Liberty working up to its just height, published by Giles Calvert
