= The Triumph of the Moon =

Book by Ronald Hutton

The Triumph of the Moon: A History of Modern Pagan Witchcraft
- The first edition cover of Hutton's book.
- Author: Ronald Hutton
- Language: English
- Subject: Religious history
- Publisher: Oxford University Press
- Publication date: 1999
- Publication place: United Kingdom
- Media type: Print (hardback & paperback)

The Triumph of the Moon: A History of Modern Pagan Witchcraft is a book of religious history by the English historian Ronald Hutton, first published by Oxford University Press in 1999. At the time, Hutton was a Reader in History at Bristol University, and had previously published a study of ancient pre-Christian religion, The Pagan Religions of the Ancient British Isles (1991) as well as studies of British folk customs and the Early Modern period.

The Triumph of the Moon deals with the history of Wicca, a contemporary Pagan religion which developed in England in the early 20th century. The first academic study to tackle the entirety of this subject, Hutton questions many assumptions about Wicca's development and argues that many of the claimed connections to longstanding hidden pagan traditions are questionable at best. However, he also argues for its importance as a genuine new religious movement. The work was first presented as "The Triumph of the Moon" by Hutton, at the Centre For Pagan Studies in 1995.

The Triumph of the Moon was well received in both academia and the mainstream press. Various academics working in the fields of Pagan studies, the history of western esotericism and the history of magic have praised it as an influential study that helped to legitimise the historical investigation of alternate and occult religious movements. An academic anthology edited by Dave Evans and Dave Green was later published in its honour, entitled Ten Years of Triumph of the Moon (2009).

The book's reception has been mixed in the Pagan community itself. Many welcome it as an authoritative account of Wiccan history, but others are more critical, arguing that Hutton has prematurely rejected the idea that Wicca is the continuation of an ancient, pre-Christian tradition. Several Wiccans taking the latter view have published their criticisms, with the Wiccan Jani Farrell-Roberts taking part in a published debate with Hutton in the British Pagan magazine The Cauldron (2003), whilst the New Zealander Ben Whitmore published a short book casting a critical eye on Hutton's work, entitled Trials of the Moon (2010).

== Background ==
=== Hutton and his research ===
Ronald Hutton was born in Ootacamund in India, and "was in fact brought up Pagan, in a modern English tradition which combined a reverence for the natural world with a love of the ancient Greek and Roman classics." In his teenage years he became acquainted with Wicca, attending his first Wiccan rite at Halloween 1968 and meeting the prominent Wiccan High Priest Alex Sanders.

"I have no interest in contesting the claims of modern Pagans to represent a secretly surviving tradition, as long as the practitioners do not attack me or offer any actual historical evidence for scrutiny. If they do neither, then they are effectively standing outside history and are not the concern of a historian... Gerald Gardner's Wicca was, however, based on specific historical evidence, above all the early modern trials, and academic framework of interpretation of it, which were very much the business of historians."

— Hutton, 2011.

Hutton had studied history at Pembroke College, Cambridge and then Magdalen College, Oxford, before gaining a job at the University of Bristol in 1981. Focusing his research interests on Early Modern England, he subsequently published a string of four books on the subject; The Royalist War Effort 1642–1646 (1982), The Restoration: A Political and Religious History of England and Wales 1658–1660 (1985), Charles the Second, King of England, Scotland and Ireland (1989) and The British Republic 1649–1660 (1990). 1991 saw the publication of his first work on the subject of pagan religion, The Pagan Religions of the Ancient British Isles, released by the publishers Blackwell.

In 1998, the year before the publication of Hutton's Triumph of the Moon, the American Wiccan Donald H. Frew (1960–) published an article entitled "Methodological Flaws in Recent Studies of Historical and Modern Witchcraft" in the Canadian journal Ethnologies in which he criticised the study of Wiccan history up till that point, including Hutton's Pagan Religions of the Ancient British Isles. Hutton responded to Frew in an article published in the journal Folklore in 2000. Entitled "Paganism and Polemic: The Debate over the Origins of Modern Pagan Witchcraft", in the paper Hutton commented that Frew's work had been a "historiographical landmark", being "only the second contribution to one of the key scholarly debates in the history of contemporary religions".

== Synopsis ==
Opening with a preface in which Hutton explains his purpose in writing the book, the first half of the work, which is titled 'Macrocosm', deals with the various influences which existed in 19th and early 20th century Britain that played a part in the development of Wicca.

=== Part One: Macrocosm ===
"[T]he subtitle of this book should really be 'a history of modern pagan witchcraft in South Britain (England, Wales, Cornwall and Man), with some reference to it in the rest of the British Isles, Continental Europe and North America'. The fact that it claims to be a history and not the history is in itself significant, for this book represents the first systematic attempt by a professional historian to characterize and account for this aspect of modern Western culture."

— Hutton, in the preface, 1999.

Chapter one, entitled 'Finding a Language', deals with the definitions of various words pertinent to this study, such as "religion" and "paganism". Hutton proceeds to look at the ways in which ancient pagans, adherents of indigenous tribal religions and druids had been depicted in Romanticist and other forms of literature, such as in the works of R. M. Ballantyne, G. K. Chesterton and Lord Byron.

The second chapter, 'Finding a Goddess', looks at the development of both a moon goddess and Mother Earth in the works of literary figures like Keats, Shelley and Charlotte Brontë. Hutton then discusses the archaeological ideas of ancient goddesses which were prevalent at the time, in particular those put forward by the likes of Arthur Evans and Jane Ellen Harrison which argued for the existence of a singular Great Goddess. In the third chapter, 'Finding a God', Hutton then tackles the view of male pagan gods, noting the widespread adoption of Apollo and Pan as modern icons by Romanticists, and discussing the wealth of literary references to Pan produced in the 19th and early 20th centuries.

=== Part Two: Microcosm ===
The latter half of the book looks at the early development of Wicca.

== Academic reception and recognition ==
=== Academic reviews ===
In his review published in The Journal of Ecclesiastical History, the historian Alec Ryrie of the University of Birmingham described Hutton's work as "a remarkable book" which offered "a brave, perhaps foolhardy" study from a scholar who was "at the height of his powers". He furthermore remarked that the book had been written with a mix of passion, calm and clarity. Ryrie went on to note that he felt it was striking that Hutton insisted on taking the religious claims of Pagans seriously and felt that he had continuously expressed contempt for the rationalism common in academic discourse. Although noting that Hutton's "willingness to take such a view in print entails a lowering of the academic's normal shield of dispassionate detachment", a position that Ryrie felt might not be "sustainable", Ryrie ultimately considered Triumph of the Moon to be "a passionate, important and consistently fascinating book."

Writing in the Journal of Contemporary History, Rodney W. Ambler noted that Hutton's work "has important insights into some of the positions adopted as the intellectual hegemony of Christianity appeared to become increasingly insecure in the course of the nineteenth century." Nonetheless, Ambler remained largely critical of the book, noting that by associating with hundreds of Wiccans in the process of researching and writing the work, Hutton had written a "highly personalized and partial study" which had a "seriously flawed" methodology.

In The Pomegranate: A New Journal of Neopagan Thought – then a scholarly but not yet academic publication – two separate academics published reviews of Hutton's book. Gina O'Connor of the University of Colorado praised the intricate nature of Hutton's investigation, arguing that its purpose was twofold; both inspiring further, in-depth investigation and weaving together a picture of the cultural milieu from which Wicca could emerge. She noted however that Hutton had failed to examine any influence on early Wicca from the countries neighbouring England, and wondered whether further investigation would reveal that England was not the only home of Pagan Witchcraft. She furthermore remains unconvinced by Hutton's argument that Gardner was the definitive founder of Wicca, but nevertheless proclaims that whether one accepts Hutton's arguments or not, his book remains the "most comprehensive and readable" of its kind.

"In this book Hutton provides history which was sorely lacking, writes in a manner accessible to the educated practitioner as well as meaningful to the scholar, and opens up areas needing further research with the academic boost of having been presented by an established scholar in a publication from a well respected press... Triumph of the Moon is a book which neither Pagan nor scholar of Pagans should go without reading."

— Sarah Whedon, 2000.

The Pomegranate also published a review of Hutton's tome authored by Sarah Whedon of the University of Colorado. Noting that it was unparalleled, she believed that it was a valuable addition to the growing field of Pagan studies, being written in an entertaining and meticulous manner. She nevertheless believed that it contained problems, for instance disagreeing with Hutton's statement that Madame Blavatsky was ultimately a Christian and believing that he had left some historical sections underdeveloped. She notes that because he is dealing with the hidden history of a mystery religion, Hutton has had to be selective in what information he decided to publish and which he kept from publication, believing that this might annoy many readers. Like O'Connor, she notes that Hutton has opened up multiple new lines of inquiry for further research, but feels that his final chapter, the sociological analysis of Wicca, was disappointing. She nevertheless thought that these criticisms were "minor" in comparison to the contribution to Pagan studies that the work brought.

=== Influence in Pagan studies ===
In 2009, Hidden Publishing released an edited volume in honour of Ronald Hutton and his Triumph of the Moon, entitled Ten Years of Triumph of the Moon: A Collection of Essays. The idea was developed by the historian Dave Evans, who felt that "the tenth birthday of something so important needed to be celebrated in some way." After initial attempts to organise an academic conference failed due to a lack of funds, Evans decided to put together a book in commemoration containing papers from a variety of academics working in the fields of Pagan studies or Western Esoteric history. In the introduction, Evans related that:

In many ways Ronald's work provides us with the history of both how we have seen ourselves and how we have constructed and reconstructed our past(s) over time, and how we continue to do so. He has a very pragmatic, creative attitude, recognising that factual error can still produce beneficial results.

== Pagan reception and recognition ==
"Ronald Hutton is the first academic historian to have attempted a full-scale history of modern Pagan witchcraft (particularly Wicca), and his scholarly yet entertaining tone in The Triumph of the Moon has star-struck a generation of Pagans and substantially changed the way we see ourselves. For some, Triumph has become a cornerstone of faith, perhaps read alongside Hutton's other books on paganism."

— Wiccan Ben Whitmore, 2010.

The response from the Pagan community was somewhat mixed. Many Pagans embraced his work, with the prominent Wiccan Elder Frederic Lamond referring to it as "an authority on the history of Gardnerian Wicca". The Pagan researcher Michael G. Lloyd, writing in his biography of Eddie Buczynski, described Hutton's book as "groundbreaking". One Pagan internet reviewer going by the pseudonym of Stryder called it "an outstanding and readable scholarly book", and stating that "Hutton maintains a balanced and objective view of the history of Wicca, and always remains respectful of neo-Pagan beliefs", ultimately giving it four stars out of five.

=== Jani Farrell-Roberts and The Cauldron debate ===
Public criticism came from the practising Wiccan Jani Farrell-Roberts, who took part in a published debate with Hutton in The Cauldron magazine in 2003. Farrell-Roberts was of the opinion that in his works, Hutton dismissed Margaret Murray's theories about the Witch-Cult using Norman Cohn's theories, which she believed to be heavily flawed. She stated that "he is... wrongly cited as an objective neutral and a 'non-pagan' for he happens to be a very active member of the British Pagan community" who "had taken on a mission to reform modern paganism by removing from it a false history and sense of continuance".

=== Ben Whitmore's Trials of the Moon ===
Alexandrian Wiccan High Priest Ben Whitmore published a scathing criticism of Hutton's Triumph of the Moon in his own short book, Trials of the Moon.

In 2010, a New Zealander and Alexandrian Wiccan High Priest named Ben Whitmore published a short book criticising both Hutton and Triumph of the Moon. Entitled Trials of the Moon: Reopening the Case for Historical Witchcraft, Whitmore's book was self-published by the Auckland-based Briar Books. In stating his case, Whitmore related that whilst he would agree with Hutton that Wicca is "largely a reinvention" of ancient paganism, he "disagree[d] with several of Hutton's supporting claims, and believed his case is overstated and deeply misleading." Describing Hutton as "a maverick historian" with a "far more conservative" take on the history of witchcraft than most of his fellows, Whitmore argues that in Triumph of the Moon, Hutton has "swept aside significant unresolved questions, significant contrary evidence and whole fields of potential inquiry."

Whitmore starts his argument by claiming that Hutton misrepresents the historical consensus of those who have studied the witch trials in the Early Modern period, highlighting the work of historians like Carlo Ginzburg, Gustav Henningsen, Gábor Klaniczay and Bengt Ankarloo, who argued that the witch trials were influenced by a substratum of pre-Christian shamanistic beliefs. Moving on, he criticises Hutton for failing to provide a solid definition of witchcraft, and then argues that, contrary to Hutton's claims, many Great Goddess cults existed in the ancient world. Proceeding to defend the ideas of ancient gods of death and resurrection put forward by James Frazer, Whitmore then looks at the British cunning folk, arguing that again Hutton made mistakes, in doing so highlighting the works of historians Emma Wilby and Éva Pócs.

Moving on, Whitmore argues that Hutton unfairly demonised those whose ideas he criticises, such as Margaret Murray, Matilda Joslyn Gage and Charles Leland, and then criticises Hutton's discussion of ceremonial magic. Critiquing Hutton's study of Dorothy Clutterbuck by making reference to the work of Philip Heselton, Whitemore then argues that Hutton is overly sympathetic to Christianity, at the expense of his treatment of ancient paganism, before criticising Hutton for too readily believing that folklore from the Christian era is not a pre-Christian survival. In the penultimate chapter, Whitemore lists the various critiques of Hutton's other books, quoting Max Dashu and Asphodel Long's criticisms of Hutton's The Pagan Religions of the Ancient British Isles (1991), Hutton's debate with J. D. Hill on Lindow Man and his public disagreements with Don Frew and Jani Farrell-Roberts.

==== Reception ====
Hutton responded to these criticisms in a 2010 paper entitled "Writing the History of Witchcraft: A Personal View", published in The Pomegranate: The International Journal of Pagan Studies. Hutton was critical of Whitmore's work, characterising it as an attempt to "destroy my reputation as an authority upon the history of Paganism and witchcraft, at least among Pagans, and especially belief in the arguments of Triumph." Noting that Whitmore "makes no attempt to construct an alternate history" to that presented in Triumph, Hutton accuses Whitmore of carrying out "very little research" into primary source material, instead basing his arguments on "secondary texts of varying quality". Contesting some of Whitmore's claims, Hutton then criticises Whitmore's final chapter, which he calls a "meanspirited" collection of "every criticism that he has been able to find of anything that I have written." He went on to challenge Whitmore on this, asking why his work in Triumph of the Moon had not been criticised by "leading figures of British and American Paganism" and by "professional historians, archaeologists, anthropologists, classicists, and literary experts" if it had been as flawed as Whitmore claims.

"[Whitmore's] whole purpose is simply to undermine confidence in me, so that—presumably—Pagan witches can go back to believing whatever they did before I wrote. Most of the points on which he tries to fault me are on detail, often trivial, and his hope is clearly that if he can put enough small cuts into my reputation for reliability, then faith in it will leak away."

— Hutton on Whitmore's work, 2010.

Ultimately, Hutton remarked that he felt "distressed to have failed Wiccans like Ben Whitmore by not providing the kind of history that they feel that they need." Believing that there had been "no necessary collision between us", Hutton felt that had Whitmore simply focused on arguing that "there was now room for a book which emphasised the richness of the ancient and medieval images and texts on which Pagans could still imaginatively draw", he would have enthusiastically supported him.

In a 2011 interview with the Australian academic Caroline Tully, Hutton responded to Whitmore's criticism that he was a "maverick historian", relating that "within the academic world the term carries only negative connotations, of eccentricity, marginality and controversy. My own career has, on the contrary, been remarkably orthodox for a professional scholar, while my work has actually provoked less controversy among my fellow professionals than that of most university-based historians."

In her review of Trials of the Moon published in The Pomegranate: The International Journal of Pagan Studies, the academic Peg Aloi noted that whilst Whitmore came across as being "clearly intelligent and well-read", he was neither a historian nor an academic, and that subsequently Trials of the Moon "demonstrates repeatedly how unfamiliar he is with how research and scholarly writing are done." Feeling that Whitmore's "primary technique" was a "consistent tone of condescension and sarcasm" directed against Hutton, Aloi was largely critical of Whitmore's book, noting that his "transparency of motive, the petulant language, the megalomaniacal attitude: all of these tonalities undermine the text to an extent that it's very hard to take it seriously."
