= Margaret Murray =

British Egyptologist (1863–1963)

Margaret Murray FSA Scot FRAI
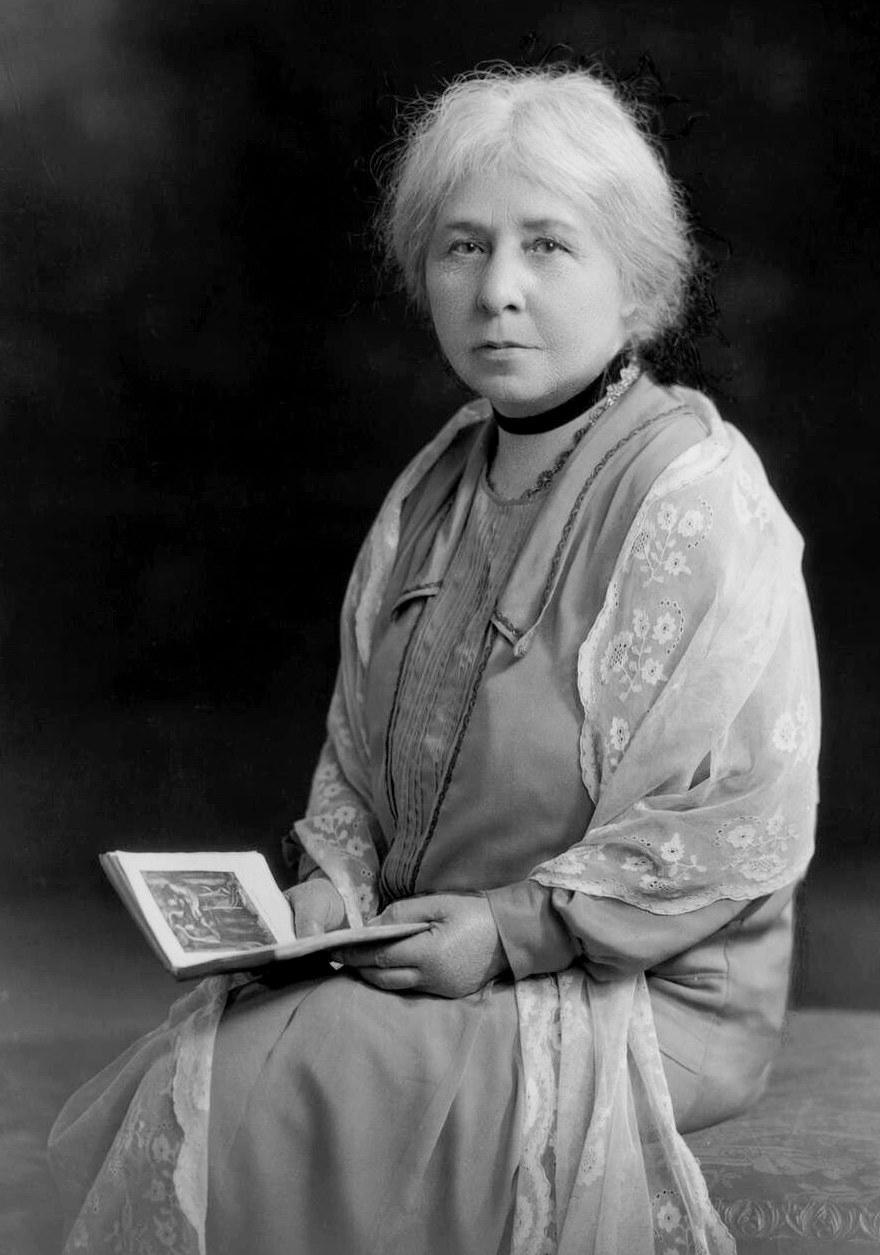
- Murray in 1928
- Born: Margaret Alice Murray; 13 July 1863; Calcutta, British India (now Kolkata, India)
- Died: 13 November 1963 (aged 100); Welwyn, Hertfordshire, England
- Education: University College London
- Occupations: Egyptologist; archaeologist; anthropologist; folklorist
- Employer: University College London (1898–1935)

Margaret Alice Murray (13 July 1863 – 13 November 1963) was a British Egyptologist, archaeologist, anthropologist, historian, and folklorist. The first woman to be appointed as a lecturer in archaeology in the United Kingdom, she worked at University College London (UCL) from 1898 to 1935. She was president of the Folklore Society from 1953 to 1955, and published widely.

Born to a wealthy middle-class English family in Calcutta, British India, Murray divided her youth between India, Britain, and Germany, training as both a nurse and a social worker. Moving to London, in 1894 she began studying Egyptology at UCL, developing a friendship with department head Flinders Petrie, who encouraged her early academic publications and appointed her junior lecturer in 1898. In 1902–1903, she took part in Petrie's excavations at Abydos, Egypt, there discovering the Osireion temple, and the following season investigated the Saqqara cemetery, both of which established her reputation in Egyptology. Supplementing her UCL wage by giving public classes and lectures at the British Museum and Manchester Museum, it was at the latter in 1908 that she led the unwrapping of Khnum-nakht, one of the mummies recovered from the Tomb of two Brothers – the first time that a woman had publicly unwrapped a mummy. Recognising that British Egyptomania reflected the existence of widespread public interest in Ancient Egypt, Murray wrote several books on Egyptology targeted at a general audience.

Murray became closely involved in the first-wave feminist movement, joining the Women's Social and Political Union and devoting much time to improving women's status at UCL. Unable to return to Egypt due to the First World War, she focused her research on the witch-cult hypothesis, the theory that the witch trials of Early Modern Christendom were an attempt to extinguish a surviving pre-Christian, pagan religion devoted to a Horned God. Although later academically discredited, the theory gained widespread attention and proved a significant influence on the emerging new religious movement of Wicca. From 1921 to 1931, she undertook excavations of prehistoric sites on Malta and Menorca and developed her interest in folkloristics. Awarded an honorary doctorate in 1927, she was appointed assistant professor in 1928 and retired from UCL in 1935. That year she visited Palestine to aid Petrie's excavation of Tall al-Ajjul and in 1937 she led a small excavation at Petra, Jordan. Taking on the presidency of the Folklore Society in later life, she lectured at such institutions as the University of Cambridge and City Literary Institute, and continued to publish until her death.

Murray's work in Egyptology and archaeology was widely acclaimed and earned her the nickname of "The Grand Old Woman of Egyptology", although after her death many of her contributions to the field were overshadowed by those of Petrie. Conversely, Murray's work in folkloristics and the history of witchcraft has been academically discredited and her methods in these areas heavily criticised. The influence of her witch-cult theory in both religion and literature has been examined by scholars, and she herself has been dubbed the "Grandmother of Wicca".

== Early life ==
=== Youth: 1863–1893 ===
Margaret Murray was born on 13 July 1863 in Calcutta, then a major military city and the capital of British India. She lived in the city with her parents James and Margaret Murray, an older sister named Mary, and her paternal grandmother and great-grandmother. James Murray, born in India of Anglo-Irish descent, was a businessman and manager of the Serampore paper mills who was thrice elected President of the Calcutta Chamber of Commerce. Margaret (née Carr) had moved to India from Britain in 1857 to work as a missionary, preaching Christianity and educating Indian women. She continued with this work after marrying James and giving birth to her two daughters.

Although most of their lives were spent in the European area of Calcutta, which was walled off from the Indian sectors of the city, Murray encountered members of Indian society through her family's employment of ten Indian servants and through childhood holidays to Mussoorie. The historian Amara Thornton has suggested that Murray's Indian childhood exerted an influence over her throughout her life, expressing the view that Murray could be seen as having a hybrid transnational identity that was both British and Indian. During her childhood, Murray received no formal education, and in later life expressed pride that she had never had to sit an exam before entering university.

In 1870, Margaret and her sister Mary were sent to Britain, moving in with their uncle John, a vicar, and his wife Harriet at their home in Lambourn, Berkshire. Although John provided them with a strongly Christian education and a belief in the inferiority of women, both of which she would reject, he awakened Murray's interest in archaeology through taking her to see local monuments. In 1873, the girls' mother arrived in Europe and took them with her to Bonn in Germany, where they both became fluent in German. In 1875 they returned to Calcutta, staying there until 1877. They then moved with their parents back to England, where they settled in Sydenham, London. There, they spent much time visiting The Crystal Palace, while their father worked at his firm's London office.

In 1880, they returned to Calcutta, where Margaret remained for the next seven years. She became a nurse at the Calcutta General Hospital, which was run by the Sisters of the Anglican Sisterhood of Clower, and there was involved with the hospital's attempts to deal with a cholera outbreak.

In 1887, she returned to England, moving to Rugby, Warwickshire, where her uncle John, now widowed, had moved. She took up employment as a social worker dealing with local underprivileged people. When her father retired to England, she moved into his house in Bushey Heath, Hertfordshire, living with him until his death in 1891. In 1893 she travelled to Madras, Tamil Nadu, where her sister had moved to with her new husband.

Later in 1893, Murray received her first introduction to Egyptology when her elder sister, Mary, alerted her to an advertisement in The Times for classes in Egyptian hieroglyphs taught by Flinders Petrie, Murray's future mentor. Reflecting upon this in her autobiography, Murray notes it was her sister's insistence on attending these classes, largely spurred on by her own inability to do so, which set her down the path of her Egyptological career.

=== Early years at University College London: 1894–1905 ===
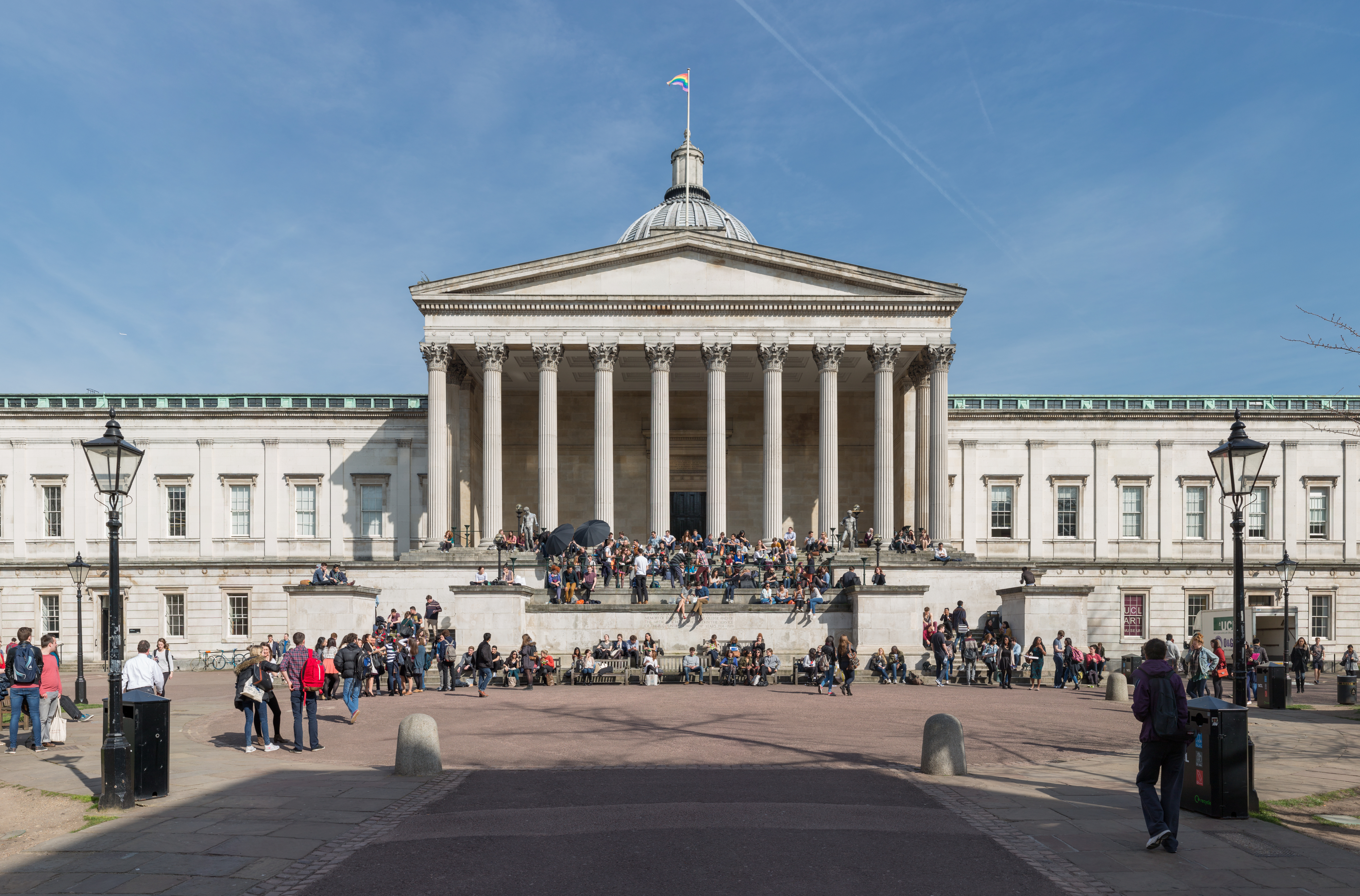
Murray studied Egyptology at the UCL Wilkins Building (pictured).

Encouraged by her mother and sister, Murray decided to enrol at the newly opened department of Egyptology at University College London (UCL). At the time of Murray's enrolment, Egyptology was not a formally trained degree, with the exception of the University of Oxford, which offered Middle Egyptian amongst a trio of "Oriental languages". Having been founded by an endowment from Amelia Edwards, one of the co-founders of the Egypt Exploration Fund (EEF), the department was run by the pioneering early archaeologist Sir William Flinders Petrie, and based in the Edwards Library of UCL's South Cloisters. Murray began her studies at UCL at age 30 in January 1894, as part of a class composed largely of other women and older men. She took courses in the Ancient Egyptian and Coptic languages which were taught by Francis Llewellyn Griffith and Walter Ewing Crum respectively.

Murray soon got to know Petrie, becoming his copyist and illustrator and producing the drawings for the published report on his excavations at Qift, Koptos. In turn, he aided and encouraged her to write her first research paper, "The Descent of Property in the Early Periods of Egyptian History", which was published in the Proceedings of the Society for Biblical Archaeology in 1895. Becoming Petrie's de facto though unofficial assistant, Murray began to give some of the linguistic lessons in Griffith's absence. In 1898 she was appointed to the position of junior lecturer, responsible for teaching the linguistic courses at the Egyptology department; this made her the first female lecturer in archaeology in the United Kingdom. In this capacity, she spent two days a week at UCL, devoting the other days to caring for her ailing mother. As time went on, she came to teach courses on Ancient Egyptian history, religion, and language.

Among Murray's students – to whom she referred as "the Gang" – were several who went on to produce noted contributions to Egyptology, including Reginald Engelbach, Georgina Aitken, Guy Brunton, and Myrtle Broome. She supplemented her UCL salary by teaching evening classes in Egyptology at the British Museum.

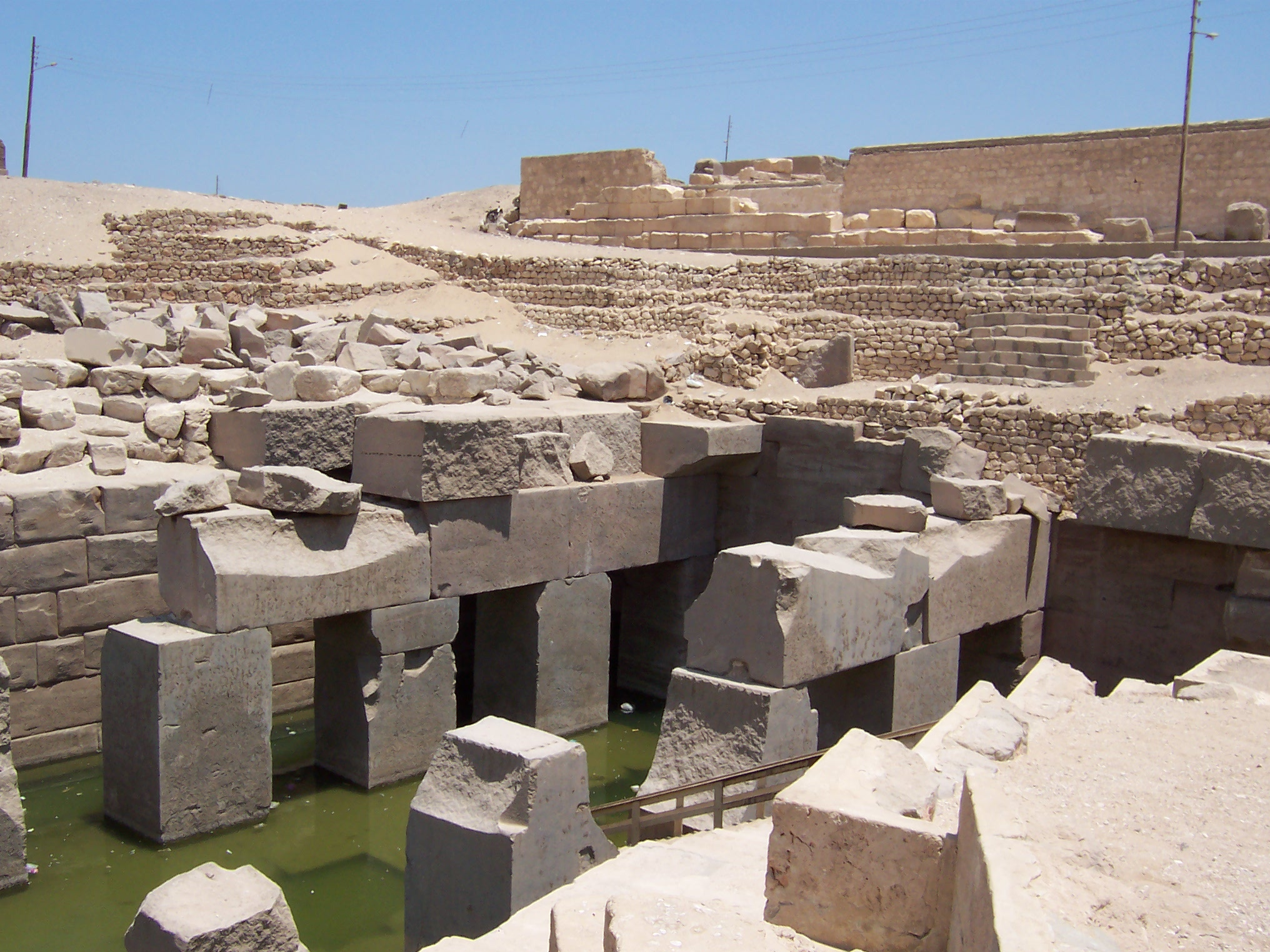
The Osireion (pictured), which was first excavated by Murray

At this point, Murray had no experience in field archaeology, and so during the 1902–1903 field season, she travelled to Egypt to join Petrie's excavations at Abydos. Petrie and his wife, Hilda Petrie, had been excavating at the site since 1899, having taken over the archaeological investigation from French Coptic scholar Émile Amélineau. Murray at first joined as site nurse, but was subsequently taught how to excavate by Petrie and given a senior position.

This led to issues with some of the male excavators, who disliked the idea of taking orders from a woman. This experience, coupled with discussions with other female excavators (some of whom were active in the feminist movement), led Murray to adopt openly feminist viewpoints. While excavating at Abydos, Murray uncovered the Osireion, a temple devoted to the god Osiris which had been constructed by order of Pharaoh Seti I during the period of the New Kingdom. She published her site report as The Osireion at Abydos in 1904; in the report, she examined the inscriptions that had been discovered at the site to discern the purpose and use of the building.

During the 1903–1904 field season, Murray returned to Egypt, and at Petrie's instruction began her investigations at the Saqqara cemetery near Cairo, which dated from the period of the Old Kingdom. Murray did not have legal permission to excavate the site, and instead spent her time transcribing the inscriptions from ten of the tombs that had been excavated in the 1860s by Auguste Mariette. She published her findings in 1905 as Saqqara Mastabas I, although would not publish translations of the inscriptions until 1937 as Saqqara Mastabas II. Both The Osireion at Abydos and Saqqara Mastabas I proved to be very influential in the Egyptological community, with Petrie recognising Murray's contribution to his own career.

=== Feminism, the First World War, and folklore: 1905–1920 ===
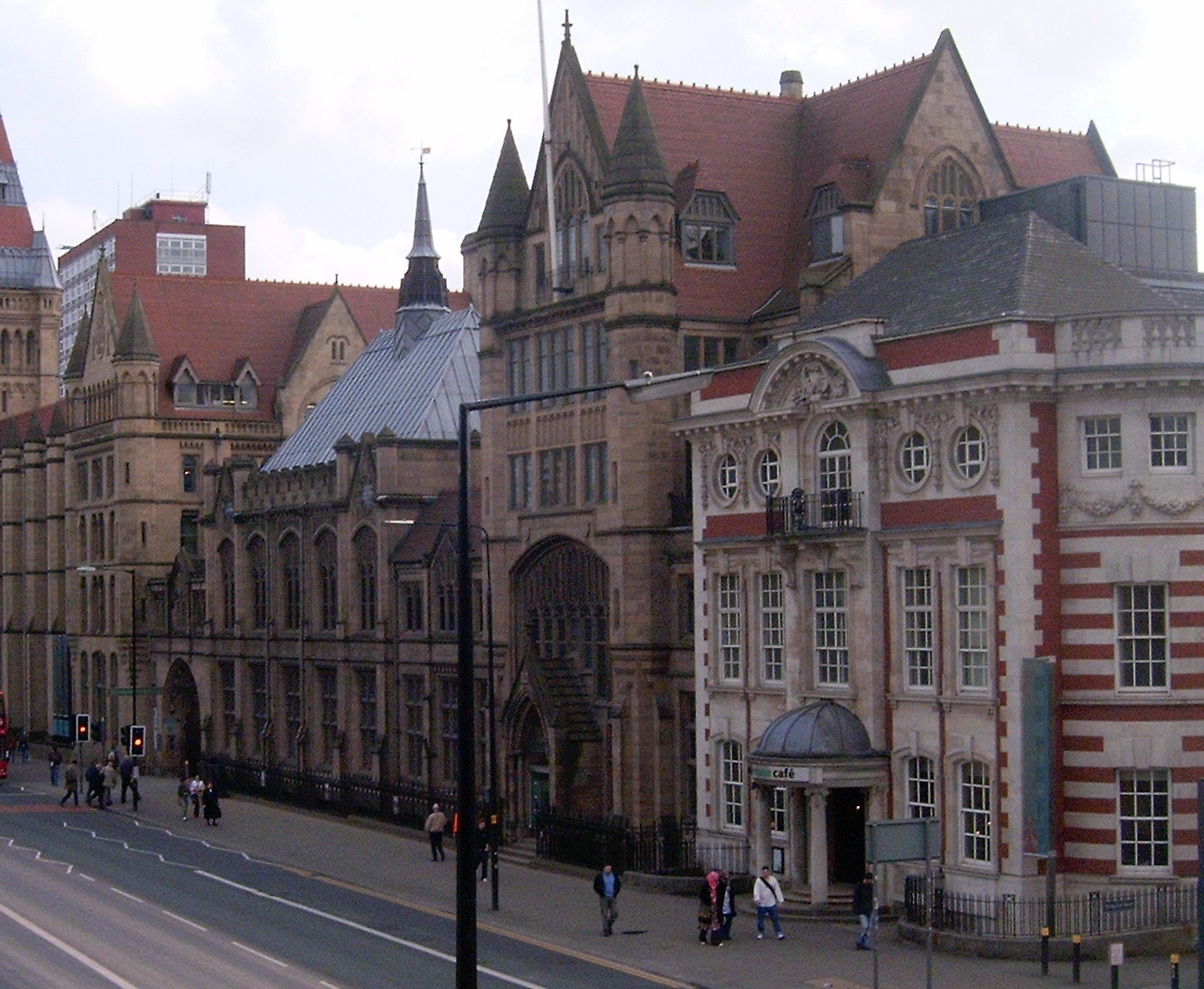
Murray came to do much lecturing and cataloguing at Manchester Museum (pictured).

On returning to London, Murray took an active role in the feminist movement, volunteering and financially donating to the cause and taking part in feminist demonstrations, protests, and marches. Joining the Women's Social and Political Union, she was present at large marches like the Mud March of 1907 and the Women's Coronation Procession of June 1911. She concealed the militancy of her actions in order to retain the image of respectability within academia. Murray also pushed the professional boundaries for women throughout her own career, and mentored other women in archaeology and throughout academia. As women could not use the men's common room, she successfully campaigned for UCL to open a common room for women, and later ensured that a larger, better-equipped room was converted for the purpose; it was later renamed the Margaret Murray Room. At UCL, she became a friend of fellow female lecturer Winifred Smith, and together they campaigned to improve the status and recognition of women in the university, with Murray becoming particularly annoyed at female staff who were afraid of upsetting or offending the male university establishment with their demands. Feeling that students should get nutritious yet affordable lunches, for many years she sat on the UCL Refectory Committee. She took on an unofficial administrative role within the Egyptology Department, and was largely responsible for introduction of a formal certificate in Egyptian archaeology in 1910.

Various museums around the United Kingdom invited Murray to advise them on their Egyptological collections, resulting in her cataloguing the Egyptian artefacts owned by the Dublin National Museum, the National Museum of Antiquities in Edinburgh, and the Society of Antiquaries of Scotland, being elected a Fellow of the latter in thanks. Petrie had established connections with the Egyptological wing of Manchester Museum in Manchester, and it was there that many of his finds had been housed. Murray thus often travelled to the museum to catalogue these artefacts, and during the 1906–07 school year regularly lectured there.

In 1907, Petrie excavated the Tomb of the Two Brothers, a Middle Kingdom burial of two Egyptian priests, Nakht-ankh and Khnum-nakht, and it was decided that Murray would carry out the public unwrapping of the latter's mummified body. Taking place at the museum in May 1908, it represented the first time that a woman had led a public mummy unwrapping and was attended by over 500 onlookers, attracting press attention. Murray was particularly keen to emphasise the importance that the unwrapping would have for the scholarly understanding of the Middle Kingdom and its burial practices, and lashed out against members of the public who saw it as immoral; she declared that "every vestige of ancient remains must be carefully studied and recorded without sentimentality and without fear of the outcry of the ignorant". She subsequently published a book about her analysis of the two bodies, The Tomb of the Two Brothers, which remained a key publication on Middle Kingdom mummification practices into the 21st century.

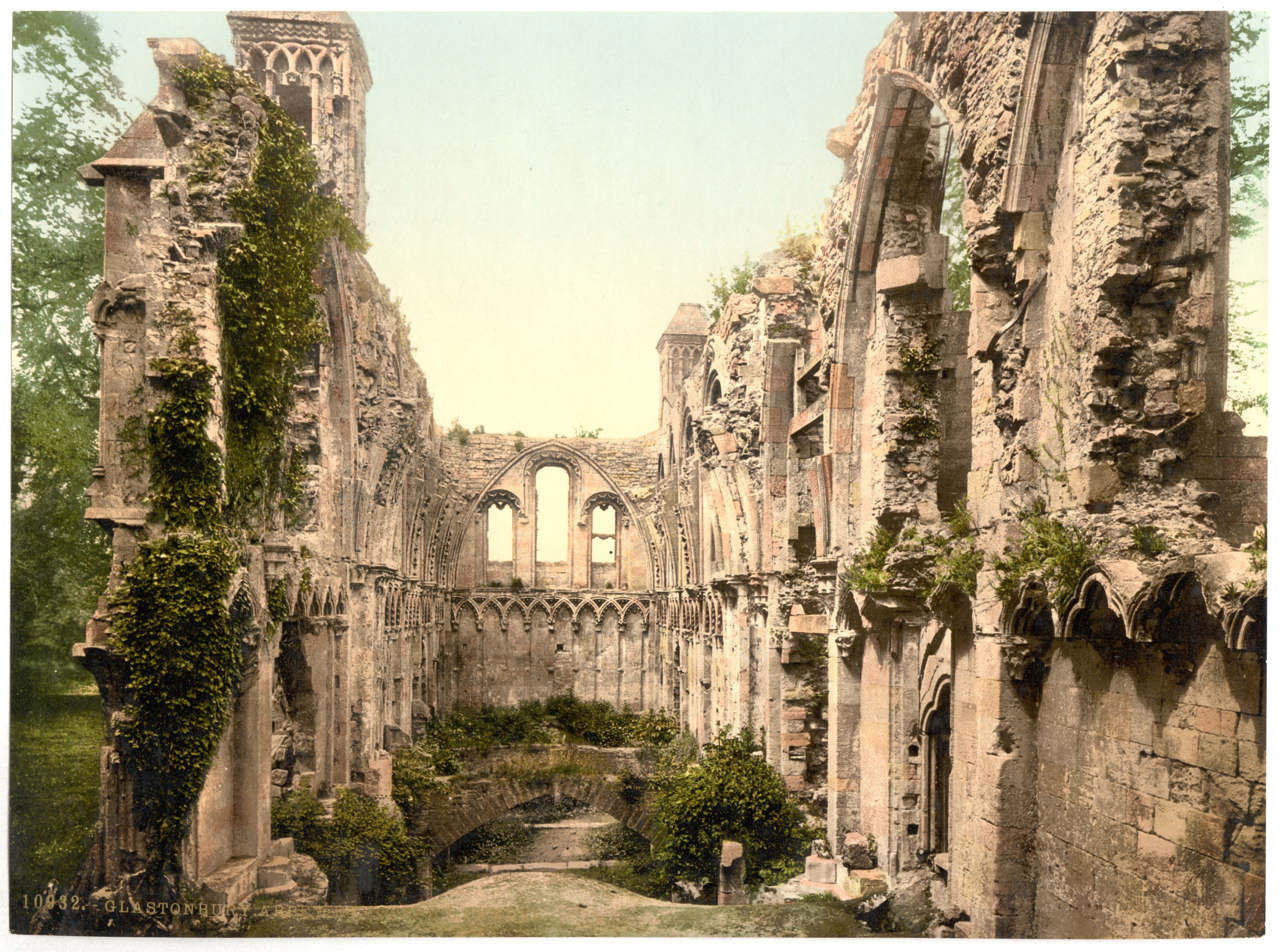
Glastonbury Abbey (pictured) inspired Murray's interest in British folklore.

Murray was dedicated to public education, hoping to infuse Egyptomania with solid scholarship about Ancient Egypt, and to this end authored a series of books aimed at a general audience. In 1905 she published Elementary Egyptian Grammar which was followed in 1911 by Elementary Coptic (Sahidic) Grammar. In 1913, she published Ancient Egyptian Legends for John Murray's "The Wisdom of the East" series. She was particularly pleased with the increased public interest in Egyptology that followed Howard Carter's discovery of the tomb of Pharaoh Tutankhamun in 1922. From at least 1911 until his death in 1940, Murray was a close friend of the anthropologist Charles Gabriel Seligman of the London School of Economics, and together they co-authored a variety of papers on Egyptology that were aimed at an anthropological audience. Many of these dealt with subjects that Egyptological journals would not publish, such as the "Sa" sign for the uterus, and thus were published in Man, the journal of the Royal Anthropological Institute. It was at Seligman's recommendation that she was invited to become a member of the Institute in 1916.

In 1914, Petrie launched the academic journal Ancient Egypt, published through his own British School of Archaeology in Egypt (BSAE), which was based at UCL. Given that he was often away from London excavating in Egypt, Murray was left to operate as de facto editor much of the time. She also published many research articles in the journal and authored many of its book reviews, particularly of the German-language publications which Petrie could not read.

The outbreak of the First World War in 1914, in which the United Kingdom went to war against Germany and the Ottoman Empire, meant that Petrie and other staff members were unable to return to Egypt for excavation. Instead, Petrie and Murray spent much of the time reorganising the artefact collections that they had attained over the past decades. To aid Britain's war effort, Murray enrolled as a volunteer nurse in the Volunteer Air Detachment of the College Women's Union Society, and for several weeks was posted to Saint-Malo in France.

After being taken ill herself, she was sent to recuperate in Glastonbury, Somerset, where she became interested in Glastonbury Abbey and the folklore surrounding it which connected it to the legendary figure of King Arthur and to the idea that the Holy Grail had been brought there by Joseph of Aramathea. Pursuing this interest, she published the paper "Egyptian Elements in the Grail Romance" in the journal Ancient Egypt, although few agreed with her conclusions and it was criticised for making unsubstantiated leaps with the evidence by the likes of Jessie Weston.

== Later life ==
=== Witch-cult, Malta, and Menorca: 1921–1935 ===
When I suddenly realised that the so-called Devil was simply a disguised man I was startled, almost alarmed, by the way the recorded facts fell into place, and showed that the witches were members of an old and primitive form of religion, and the records had been made by members of a new and persecuting form.

— Margaret Murray, 1963.

Murray's interest in folklore led her to develop an interest in the witch trials of Early Modern Europe. In 1917, she published a paper in Folklore, the journal of the Folklore Society, in which she first articulated her version of the witch-cult theory, arguing that the witches persecuted in European history were actually followers of "a definite religion with beliefs, ritual, and organization as highly developed as that of any cult in the end". She followed this up with papers on the subject in the journals Man and the Scottish Historical Review. She articulated these views more fully in her 1921 book The Witch-Cult in Western Europe, published by Oxford University Press after receiving a positive peer review by Henry Balfour, and which received both criticism and support on publication. Many reviews in academic journals were critical, with historians claiming that she had distorted and misinterpreted the contemporary records that she was using, but the book was nevertheless influential.

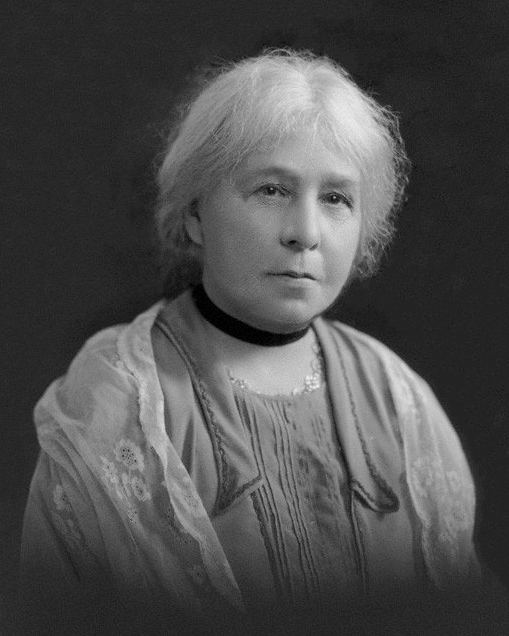
Murray in London in 1928

As a result of her work in this area, she was invited to provide the entry on "witchcraft" for the fourteenth edition of the Encyclopædia Britannica in 1929. She used the opportunity to propagate her own witch-cult theory, failing to mention the alternate theories proposed by other academics. Her entry would be included in the encyclopedia until 1969, becoming readily accessible to the public, and it was for this reason that her ideas on the subject had such a significant impact. It received a particularly enthusiastic reception by occultists such as Dion Fortune, Lewis Spence, Ralph Shirley, and J. W. Brodie Innes, perhaps because its claims regarding an ancient secret society chimed with similar claims common among various occult groups. Murray joined the Folklore Society in February 1927, and was elected to the society's council a month later, although she stood down in 1929. Murray reiterated her witch-cult theory in her 1933 book, The God of the Witches, which was aimed at a wider, non-academic audience. In this book, she cut out or toned down what she saw as the more unpleasant aspects of the witch-cult, such as animal and child sacrifice, and began describing the religion in more positive terms as "the Old Religion".

At UCL, Murray was promoted to lecturer in 1921 and to senior lecturer in 1922. From 1921 to 1927, she led archaeological excavations on Malta, assisted by Edith Guest and Gertrude Caton Thompson. She excavated the Bronze Age megalithic monuments of Santa Sofia, Santa Maria tal-Bakkari, Għar Dalam, and Borġ in-Nadur, all of which were threatened by the construction of a new aerodrome. In this she was funded by the Percy Sladen Memorial Fund. Her resulting three-volume excavation report came to be seen as an important publication within the field of Maltese archaeology. During the excavations, she had taken an interest in the island's folklore, resulting in the 1932 publication of her book Maltese Folktales, much of which was a translation of earlier stories collected by Manuel Magri and her friend Liza Galea. In 1932 Murray returned to Malta to aid in the cataloguing of the Bronze Age pottery collection held in Malta Museum, resulting in another publication, Corpus of the Bronze Age Pottery of Malta.

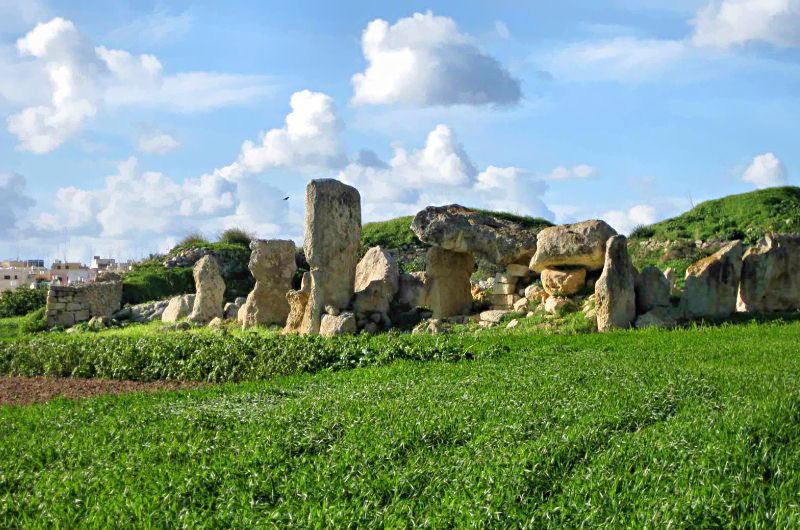
Murray excavated at Borġ in-Nadur in Malta (pictured).

On the basis of her work in Malta, Louis Clarke, the curator of the Cambridge Museum of Ethnology and Anthropology, invited her to lead excavations on the island of Menorca from 1930 to 1931. With the aid of Guest, she excavated the talaiotic sites of Trepucó and Sa Torreta de Tramuntana, resulting in the publication of Cambridge Excavations in Minorca. Murray also continued to publish works on Egyptology for a general audience, such as Egyptian Sculpture (1930) and Egyptian Temples (1931), which received largely positive reviews. In the summer of 1925 she led a team of volunteers to excavate Homestead Moat in Whomerle Wood near to Stevenage, Hertfordshire; she did not publish an excavation report and did not mention the event in her autobiography, with her motives for carrying out the excavation remaining unclear.

In 1924, UCL promoted Murray to the position of assistant professor, and, in 1927, she was awarded an honorary doctorate for her career in Egyptology. That year, Murray was tasked with guiding Mary of Teck, the Queen consort, around the Egyptology department during the latter's visit to UCL. The pressures of teaching had eased by this point, allowing Murray to spend more time travelling internationally; in 1920 she returned to Egypt and in 1929 visited South Africa, where she attended the meeting of the British Association for the Advancement of Science, whose theme was the prehistory of southern Africa. In the early 1930s she travelled to the Soviet Union, where she visited museums in Leningrad, Moscow, Kharkov, and Kiev, and then in late 1935 she undertook a lecture tour of Norway, Sweden, Finland, and Estonia.

Although having reached legal retirement age in 1927, and thus unable to be offered another five-year contract, Murray was reappointed on an annual basis each year until 1935. At this point, she retired, expressing the opinion that she was glad to leave UCL, for reasons that she did not make clear. In 1933, Petrie had retired from UCL and moved to Jerusalem in Mandatory Palestine with his wife; Murray therefore took over as editor of the Ancient Egypt journal, renaming it Ancient Egypt and the East to reflect its increasing research interest in the ancient societies that surrounded and interacted with Egypt. The journal folded in 1935, perhaps due to Murray's retirement. Murray then spent some time in Jerusalem, where she aided the Petries in their excavation at Tall al-Ajjul, a Bronze Age mound south of Gaza.

=== Petra, Cambridge, and London: 1935–1953 ===
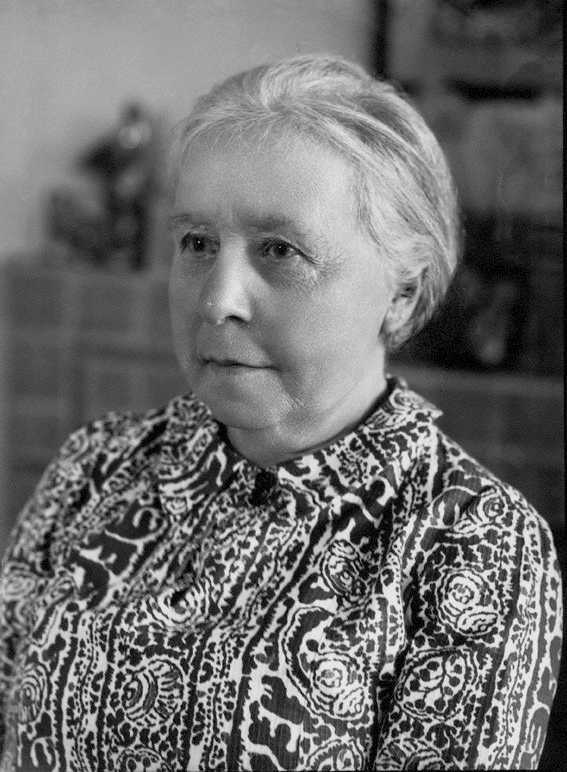
Murray in 1938

During Murray's 1935 trip to Palestine, she visited Petra in neighbouring Jordan. Intrigued by the site, in March and April 1937 she returned in order to carry out a small excavation in several cave dwellings at the site, subsequently writing both an excavation report and a guidebook on Petra. Back in England, from 1934 to 1940, Murray aided the cataloguing of Egyptian antiquities at Girton College, Cambridge, and also gave lectures in Egyptology at the university until 1942. Her interest in folklore more broadly continued and she wrote the introduction to Lincolnshire Folklore by Ethel Rudkin, in which she discussed how superior women were as folklorists to men.

During the Second World War, Murray evaded the Blitz of London by moving to Cambridge, where she volunteered for a group (probably the Army Bureau of Current Affairs or The British Way and Purpose) who educated military personnel to prepare them for post-war life. Based in the city, she embarked on research into the town's Early Modern history, examining documents stored in local parish churches, Downing College, and Ely Cathedral; she never published her findings. In 1945, she briefly became involved in the "Who put Bella in the Wych Elm?" murder case.

After the war ended she returned to London, settling into a bedsit room in Endsleigh Street, which was close to University College London (UCL) and the Institute of Archaeology (then an independent institution, now part of UCL); she continued her involvement with the former and made use of the latter's library. On most days, she visited the British Museum in order to consult their library, and twice a week she taught adult education classes on Ancient Egyptian history and religion at the City Literary Institute; upon her retirement from this position she nominated her former pupil, Veronica Seton-Williams, to replace her.

Murray's interest in popularising Egyptology among the wider public continued; in 1949 she published Ancient Egyptian Religious Poetry, her second work for John Murray's "The Wisdom of the East" series. That year she also published The Splendour That Was Egypt, in which she collated many of her UCL lectures. The book adopted a diffusionist perspective that argued that Egypt influenced Greco-Roman society and thus modern Western society. This was seen as a compromise between Petrie's belief that other societies influenced the emergence of Egyptian civilisation and Grafton Elliot Smith's highly unorthodox and heavily criticised hyperdiffusionist view that Egypt was the source of all global civilisation. The book received a mixed reception from the archaeological community.

=== Final years: 1953–1963 ===
[I] went to her hundredth birthday party where she sat enthroned—no other word for it—surrounded by family and friends. A distant cousin—what we would have called an elderly lady of eighty—was bringing greetings from even more distant relatives in Australia and suddenly forgot, as happens to many people half her age and a third of the age of Ma Murray, one name. "How stupid of me, Cousin Margaret", she said, "how stupid the name has quite gone out of my head." Ma Murray focused her eyes on this old lady twenty years her junior—cold eyes in which feeling seemed extinguished in the neutrality of eternity—and said gently and kindly, "Not stupidity, my dear. Not stupidity: just mental laziness."

— Glyn Daniel, 1964

In 1953, Murray was appointed to the presidency of the Folklore Society following the resignation of former president Allan Gomme. The Society had initially approached John Mavrogordato for the post, but he had declined, with Murray accepting the nomination several months later. Murray remained president for two terms, until 1955. In her 1954 presidential address, "England as a Field for Folklore Research", she lamented what she saw as the English people's disinterest in their own folklore in favour of that from other nations. For the autumn 1961 issue of Folklore, the society published a festschrift to Murray to commemorate her 98th birthday. The issue contained contributions from various scholars paying tribute to her – with papers dealing with archaeology, fairies, Near Eastern religious symbols, Greek folk songs – but notably not about witchcraft, potentially because no other folklorists were willing to defend her witch-cult theory.

In May 1957, Murray had championed the archaeologist T. C. Lethbridge's controversial claims that he had discovered three pre-Christian chalk hill figures on Wandlebury Hill in the Gog Magog Hills, Cambridgeshire. Privately she expressed concern about the reality of the figures. Lethbridge subsequently authored a book championing her witch-cult theory in which he sought the cult's origins in pre-Christian culture. In 1960, she donated her collection of papers – including correspondences with a wide range of individuals across the country – to the Folklore Society Archive, where it is now known as "the Murray Collection".

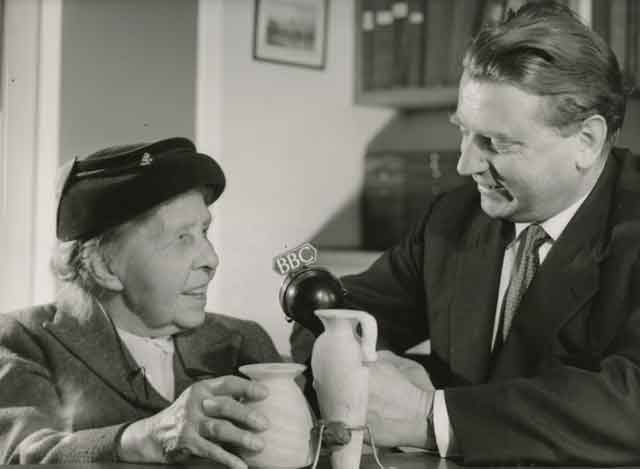
Murray being interviewed by the BBC, c. 1960

Crippled with arthritis, Murray had moved into a home in North Finchley, north London, where she was cared for by a retired couple who were trained nurses; from here she occasionally took taxis into central London to visit the UCL library. Amid failing health, in 1962 Murray moved into the Queen Victoria Memorial Hospital, Welwyn, Hertfordshire, where she could receive 24-hour care; she lived here for the final 18 months of her life. To mark her hundredth birthday, on 13 July 1963 a group of her friends, former students, and doctors gathered for a party at nearby Ayot St. Lawrence. Two days later, her doctor drove her to UCL for a second birthday party, again attended by many of her friends, colleagues, and former students; it was the last time that she visited the university. In Man, the journal of the Royal Anthropological Institute, it was noted that Murray was "the only Fellow of the Institute to [reach their centenary] within living memory, if not in its whole history". That year she published two books; one was The Genesis of Religion, in which she argued that humanity's first deities had been goddesses rather than male gods. The second was her autobiography, My First Hundred Years, which received predominantly positive reviews. She died on 13 November 1963, and her body was cremated.

== Murray's witch-cult hypotheses ==
The later folklorists Caroline Oates and Juliette Wood have suggested that Murray was best known for her witch-cult theory, with biographer Margaret S. Drower expressing the view that it was her work on this subject which "perhaps more than any other, made her known to the general public". It has been claimed that Murray's was the "first feminist study of the witch trials", as well as being the first to have actually "empowered the witches" by giving the (largely female) accused both free will and a voice distinct from that of their interrogators. The theory was faulty, in part because all of her academic training was in Egyptology, with no background knowledge in European history, but also because she exhibited a "tendency to generalize wildly on the basis of very slender evidence".

Oates and Wood, however, noted that Murray's interpretations of the evidence fit within wider perspectives on the past that existed at the time, stating that "Murray was far from isolated in her method of reading ancient ritual origins into later myths". In particular, her approach was influenced by the work of the anthropologist James Frazer, who had argued for the existence of a pervasive dying-and-resurrecting god myth, and she was also influenced by the interpretative approaches of E. O. James, Karl Pearson, Herbert Fleure, and Harold Peake.

=== Argument ===
The extreme negative and positive reactions to The Witch-Cult in Western Europe, as well as its legacy in religion and literature, register as responses to its fantastical form and content and especially to its implication of an alternate, woman-centered history of Western religion. At least one contemporary review turns Murray's suggestion of continuity between the premodern witches and contemporary women back on her in an ad hominem attack.

— Mimi Winick, 2015.

In The Witch-Cult in Western Europe, Murray stated that she had restricted her research to Great Britain, although made some recourse to sources from France, Flanders, and New England. She drew a division between what she termed "Operative Witchcraft", which referred to the performance of spells with any purpose, and "Ritual Witchcraft", by which she meant "the ancient religion of Western Europe", a fertility-based faith that she also termed "the Dianic cult". She claimed that the cult had "very probably" once been devoted to the worship of both a male deity and a "Mother Goddess" but that "at the time when the cult is recorded the worship of the male deity appears to have superseded that of the female". In her argument, Murray claimed that the figure referred to as the Devil in the trial accounts was the witches' god, "manifest and incarnate", to whom the witches offered their prayers. She claimed that at the witches' meetings, the god would be personified, usually by a man or at times by a woman or an animal; when a human personified this entity, Murray claimed that they were usually dressed plainly, though they appeared in full costume for the witches' Sabbaths.

Members joined the cult either as children or adults through what Murray called "admission ceremonies"; Murray asserted that applicants had to agree to join of their own free will, and agree to devote themselves to the service of their deity. She also claimed that in some cases, these individuals had to sign a covenant or were baptised into the faith. At the same time, she claimed that the religion was largely passed down hereditary lines. Murray described the religion as being divided into covens containing thirteen members, led by a coven officer who was often termed the "Devil" in the trial accounts, but who was accountable to a "Grand Master". According to Murray, the records of the coven were kept in a secret book, with the coven also disciplining its members, to the extent of executing those deemed traitors.

Describing this witch-cult as "a joyous religion", she claimed that the two primary festivals that it celebrated were on May Eve and November Eve, although that other dates of religious observation were 1 February and 1 August, the winter and summer solstices, and Easter. She asserted that the "General Meeting of all members of the religion" were known as Sabbaths, while the more private ritual meetings were known as Esbats. The Esbats, Murray claimed, were nocturnal rites that began at midnight, and were "primarily for business, whereas the Sabbath was purely religious". At the former, magical rites were performed both for malevolent and benevolent ends. She asserted the Sabbath ceremonies involved the witches paying homage to the deity, renewing their "vows of fidelity and obedience" to him, and providing him with accounts of all the magical actions that they had conducted since the previous Sabbath. Once this business had been concluded, admissions to the cult or marriages were conducted, ceremonies and fertility rites took place, and then the Sabbath ended with feasting and dancing.

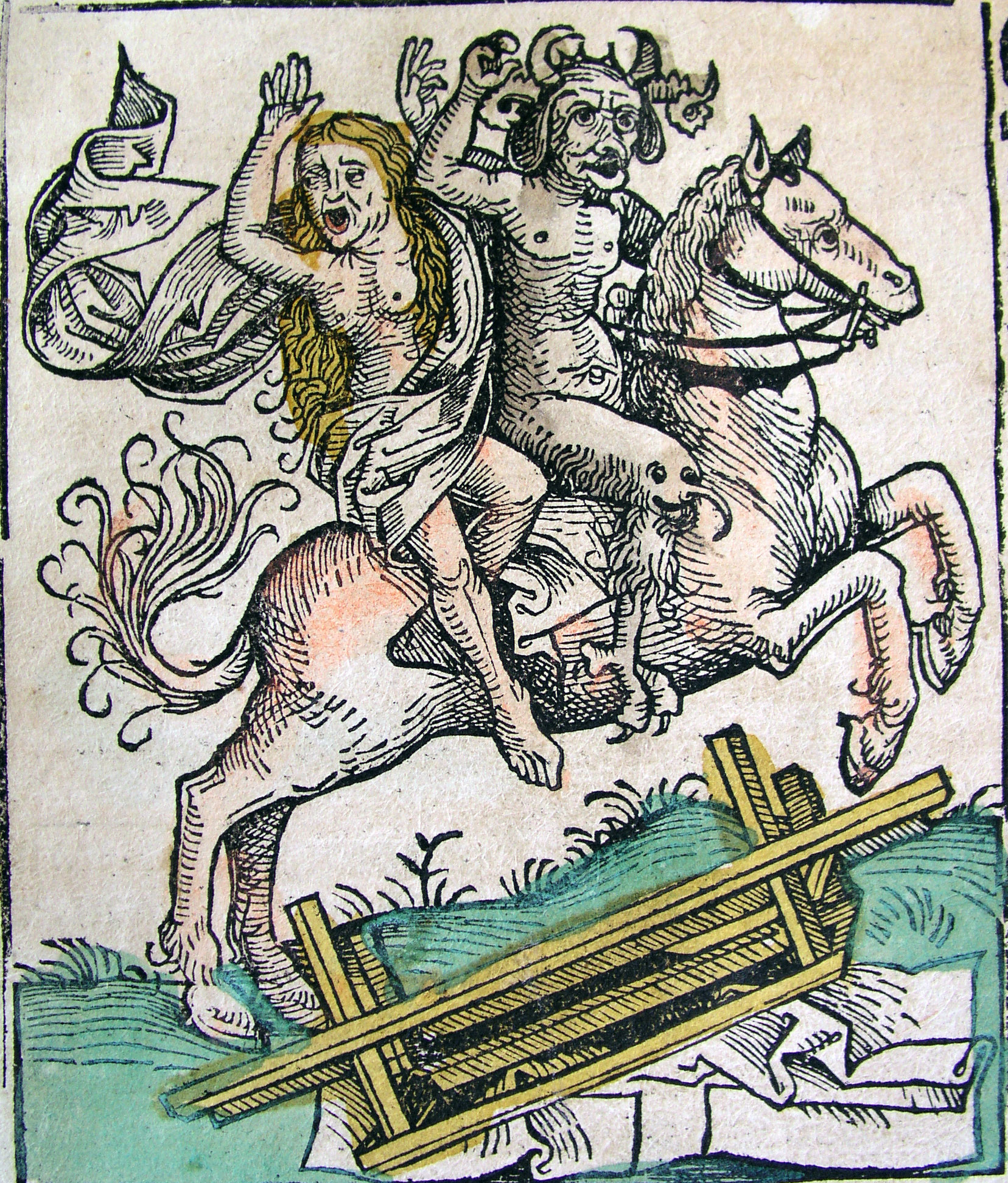
The Devil on horseback. Nuremberg Chronicle (1493).

Deeming Ritual Witchcraft to be "a fertility cult", she asserted that many of its rites were designed to ensure fertility and rain-making. She claimed that there were four types of sacrifice performed by the witches: blood-sacrifice, in which the neophyte writes their name in blood; the sacrifice of animals; the sacrifice of a non-Christian child to procure magical powers; and the sacrifice of the witches' god by fire to ensure fertility. She interpreted accounts of witches shapeshifting into various animals as being representative of a rite in which the witches dressed as specific animals which they took to be sacred. She asserted that accounts of familiars were based on the witches' use of animals, which she divided into "divining familiars" used in divination and "domestic familiars" used in other magic rites.

Murray asserted that a pre-Christian fertility-based religion had survived the Christianization process in Britain, although that it came to be "practised only in certain places and among certain classes of the community". She believed that folkloric stories of fairies in Britain were based on a surviving race of dwarfs, who continued to live on the island up until the Early Modern period. She asserted that this race followed the same pagan religion as the witches, thus explaining the folkloric connection between the two. In the appendices to the book, she also alleged that Joan of Arc and Gilles de Rais were members of the witch-cult and were executed for it, a claim which has been refuted by historians, especially in the case of Joan of Arc.

The later historian Ronald Hutton commented that The Witch-Cult in Western Europe "rested upon a small amount of archival research, with extensive use of printed trial records in 19th-century editions, plus early modern pamphlets and works of demonology". He also noted that the book's tone was generally "dry and clinical, and every assertion was meticulously footnoted to a source, with lavish quotation". It was not a bestseller; in its first thirty years, only 2,020 copies were sold. However, it led many people to treat Murray as an authority on the subject; in 1929, she was invited to provide the entry on "Witchcraft" for the Encyclopædia Britannica, and used it to present her interpretation of the subject as if it were universally accepted in scholarship. It remained in the encyclopedia until being replaced in 1969.

Murray followed The Witch-Cult in Western Europe with The God of the Witches, published by the popular press Sampson Low in 1931; although similar in content, unlike her previous volume it was aimed at a mass market audience. The tone of the book also differed strongly from its predecessor, containing "emotionally inflated [language] and coloured with religious phraseology" and repeatedly referring to the witch-cult as "the Old Religion". In this book she also "cut out or toned down" many of the claims made in her previous volume which would have painted the cult in a bad light, such as those which discussed sex and the sacrifice of animals and children.

In this book she began to refer to the witches' deity as the Horned God, and asserted that it was an entity who had been worshipped in Europe since the Palaeolithic. She further asserted that in the Bronze Age, the worship of the deity could be found throughout Europe, Asia, and parts of Africa, claiming that the depiction of various horned figures from these societies proved that. Among the evidence cited were the horned figures found at Mohenjo-Daro, which are often interpreted as depictions of Pashupati, as well as the deities Osiris and Amon in Egypt and the Minotaur of Minoan Crete. Within continental Europe, she claimed that the Horned God was represented by Pan in Greece, Cernunnos in Gaul, and in various Scandinavian rock carvings. Claiming that this divinity had been declared the Devil by the Christian authorities, she nevertheless asserted that his worship was testified in officially Christian societies right through to the Modern period, citing folkloric practices such as the Dorset Ooser and the Puck Fair as evidence of his veneration.

In 1954, she published The Divine King in England, in which she greatly extended on the theory, taking influence from Frazer's The Golden Bough, an anthropological book that made the claim that societies all over the world sacrificed their kings to the deities of nature. In her book, she claimed that this practice had continued into medieval England, and that, for instance, the death of William II was really a ritual sacrifice. No academic took the book seriously, and it was ignored by many of her supporters.

=== Academic reception ===
==== Early support ====
Upon initial publication, Murray's thesis gained a favourable reception from many readers, including some significant scholars, albeit none who were experts in the witch trials. Historians of Early Modern Britain like George Norman Clark and Christopher Hill incorporated her theories into their work, although they subsequently distanced themselves from the theory. For the 1961 reprint of The Witch-Cult in Western Europe, the Medieval historian Steven Runciman provided a foreword in which he accepted that some of Murray's "minor details may be open to criticism", but in which he was otherwise supportive of her thesis. Her theories were recapitulated by Arno Runeberg in his 1947 book Witches, Demons and Fertility Magic as well as Pennethorne Hughes in his 1952 book Witches. As a result, the Canadian historian Elliot Rose, writing in 1962, claimed that the Murrayite interpretations of the witch trials "seem to hold, at the time of writing, an almost undisputed sway at the higher intellectual levels", being widely accepted among "educated people".

Rose suggested that the reason that Murray's theory gained such support was partly because of her "imposing credentials" as a member of staff at UCL, a position that lent her theory greater legitimacy in the eyes of many readers. He further suggested that the Murrayite view was attractive to many as it confirmed "the general picture of pre-Christian Europe a reader of Frazer or [Robert] Graves would be familiar with". Similarly, Hutton suggested that the cause of the Murrayite theory's popularity was because it "appealed to so many of the emotional impulses of the age", including "the notion of the English countryside as a timeless place full of ancient secrets", the literary popularity of Pan, the widespread belief that the majority of British had remained pagan long after the process of Christianisation, and the idea that folk customs represented pagan survivals. At the same time, Hutton suggested, it seemed more plausible to many than the previously dominant rationalist idea that the witch trials were the result of mass delusion.

Related to this, the folklorist Jacqueline Simpson suggested that part of the Murrayite theory's appeal was that it appeared to give a "sensible, demystifying, liberating approach to a longstanding but sterile argument" between the rationalists who denied that there had been any witches and those, like Montague Summers, who insisted that there had been a real Satanic conspiracy against Christendom in the Early Modern period replete with witches with supernatural powers. "How refreshing", noted the historian Hilda Ellis Davidson, "and exciting her first book was at that period. A new approach, and such a surprising one."

==== Early criticism ====
Surely, discussion of what confessedly is so unripe is premature. When Miss Murray has broadened her study to all the lands where she can find the "cult"; when she has dealt with documents worthier the name of records than the chapbooks and the formless reports that have to serve us for the British trials; when she has traced back witch-sabbath and questionary through the centuries of witch and heretic hunting that precede the British; when she has trusted herself to study the work of other students and fairly to weigh their conclusions against her own in the light of the further evidence they may adduce: then perhaps she may have modified her views. Whether she changes or confirms them, she will then have earned the right to a hearing.

— George L. Burr, 1922.

Murray's theories never received support from experts in the Early Modern witch trials, and from her early publications onward many of her ideas were challenged by those who highlighted her "factual errors and methodological failings". Indeed, the majority of scholarly reviews of her work produced during the 1920s and 1930s were largely critical. George L. Burr reviewed both of her initial books on the witch-cult for the American Historical Review. He stated that she was not acquainted with the "careful general histories by modern scholars" and criticised her for assuming that the trial accounts accurately reflected the accused witches' genuine experiences of witchcraft, regardless of whether those confessions had been obtained through torture and coercion. He also charged her with selectively using the evidence to serve her interpretation, for instance by omitting any supernatural or miraculous events that appear in the trial accounts. W. R. Halliday was highly critical in his review for Folklore, as was E. M. Loeb in his review for American Anthropologist.

Soon after, one of the foremost specialists of the trial records, L'Estrange Ewen, brought out a series of books which rejected Murray's interpretation. Rose suggested that Murray's books on the witch-cult "contain an incredible number of minor errors of fact or of calculation and several inconsistencies of reasoning". He accepted that her case "could, perhaps, still be proved by somebody else, though I very much doubt it". Highlighting that there is a gap of about a thousand years between the Christianisation of Britain and the start of the witch trials there, he argues that there is no evidence for the existence of the witch-cult anywhere in the intervening period. He further criticises Murray for treating pre-Christian Britain as a socially and culturally monolithic entity, whereas in reality, it contained a diverse array of societies and religious beliefs. He also challenges Murray's claim that the majority of Britons in the Middle Ages remained pagan as "a view grounded on ignorance alone".

Murray did not respond directly to the criticisms of her work, but reacted to her critics in a hostile manner; in later life she asserted that she eventually ceased reading reviews of her work, and believed that her critics were simply acting out of their own Christian prejudices to non-Christian religion. Simpson noted that despite these critical reviews, within the field of British folkloristics, Murray's theories were permitted "to pass unapproved but unchallenged, either out of politeness or because nobody was really interested enough to research the topic". As evidence, she noted that no substantial research articles on the subject of witchcraft were published in Folklore between Murray's in 1917 and Rossell Hope Robbins's in 1963. She highlighted that when regional studies of British folklore were published in this period by folklorists like Theo Brown, Ruth Tongue, or Enid Porter, none adopted the Murrayite framework for interpreting witchcraft beliefs, thus evidencing her claim that Murray's theories were widely ignored by scholars of folkloristics.

==== Academic rejection ====
Murray's work was increasingly criticised following her death in 1963, with the definitive academic rejection of the Murrayite witch-cult theory occurring during the 1970s. During these decades, a variety of scholars across Europe and North America – such as Alan Macfarlane, Erik Midelfort, William Monter, Robert Muchembled, Gerhard Schormann, Bente Alver and Bengt Ankarloo – published in-depth studies of the archival records from the witch trials, leaving no doubt that those tried for witchcraft were not practitioners of a surviving pre-Christian religion. In 1971, the English historian Keith Thomas stated that on the basis of this research, there was "very little evidence to suggest that the accused witches were either devil-worshippers or members of a pagan fertility cult". He stated that Murray's conclusions were "almost totally groundless" because she ignored the systematic study of the trial accounts provided by Ewen and instead used sources very selectively to argue her point.

In 1975, the historian Norman Cohn commented that Murray's "knowledge of European history, even of English history, was superficial and her grasp of historical method was non-existent", adding that her ideas were "firmly set in an exaggerated and distorted version of the Frazerian mould". That same year, the historian of religion Mircea Eliade described Murray's work as "hopelessly inadequate", containing "numberless and appalling errors". In 1996, the feminist historian Diane Purkiss stated that although Murray's thesis was "intrinsically improbable" and commanded "little or no allegiance within the modern academy", she felt that male scholars like Thomas, Cohn, and Macfarlane had unfairly adopted an androcentric approach by which they contrasted their own, male and methodologically sound interpretation against Murray's "feminised belief" about the witch-cult.

That this "old religion" persisted secretly, without leaving any evidence, is, of course, possible, just as it is possible that below the surface of the moon lie extensive deposits of Stilton cheese. Anything is possible. But it is nonsense to assert the existence of something for which no evidence exists. The Murrayites ask us to swallow a most peculiar sandwich: a large piece of the wrong evidence between two thick slices of no evidence at all.

— Jeffrey B. Russell and Brooks Alexander, 2007.

Hutton stated that Murray had treated her source material with "reckless abandon", in that she had taken "vivid details of alleged witch practices" from "sources scattered across a great extent of space and time" and then declared them to be normative of the cult as a whole. Simpson outlined how Murray had selected her use of evidence very specifically, particularly by ignoring and/or rationalising any accounts of supernatural or miraculous events in the trial records, thereby distorting the events that she was describing. Thus, Simpson pointed out, Murray rationalised claims that the cloven-hoofed Devil appeared at the witches' Sabbath by stating that he was a man with a special kind of shoe, and similarly asserted that witches' claims to have flown through the air on broomsticks were actually based on their practice of either hopping along on broomsticks or smearing hallucinogenic salves onto themselves. Concurring with this assessment, the historian Jeffrey Burton Russell, writing with the independent author Brooks Alexander, stated that "Murray's use of sources, in general, is appalling". The pair went on to claim that "today, scholars are agreed that Murray was more than just wrong – she was completely and embarrassingly wrong on nearly all of her basic premises".

The Italian historian Carlo Ginzburg has been cited as being willing to give "some slight support" to Murray's theory. Ginzburg stated that although her thesis had been "formulated in a wholly uncritical way" and contained "serious defects", it did contain "a kernel of truth". He stated his opinion that she was right in claiming that European witchcraft had "roots in an ancient fertility cult", something that he argued was vindicated by his work researching the benandanti, an agrarian visionary tradition recorded in the Friuli district of Northeastern Italy during the 16th and 17th centuries. Several historians and folklorists have pointed out that Ginzburg's arguments are very different to Murray's: whereas Murray argued for the existence of a pre-Christian witches' cult whose members physically met during the witches' Sabbaths, Ginzburg argued that some of the European visionary traditions that were conflated with witchcraft in the Early Modern period had their origins in pre-Christian fertility religions. Moreover, other historians have expressed criticism of Ginzburg's interpretation of the benandanti; Cohn stated that there was "nothing whatsoever" in the source material to justify the idea that the benandanti were the "survival of an age-old fertility cult". Echoing these views, Hutton commented that Ginzburg's claim that the benandanti's visionary traditions were a survival from pre-Christian practices was an idea resting on "imperfect material and conceptual foundations". He added that Ginzburg's "assumption" that "what was being dreamed about in the sixteenth century had in fact been acted out in religious ceremonies" dating to "pagan times", was entirely "an inference of his own" and not one supported by the documentary evidence.

== Personal life ==
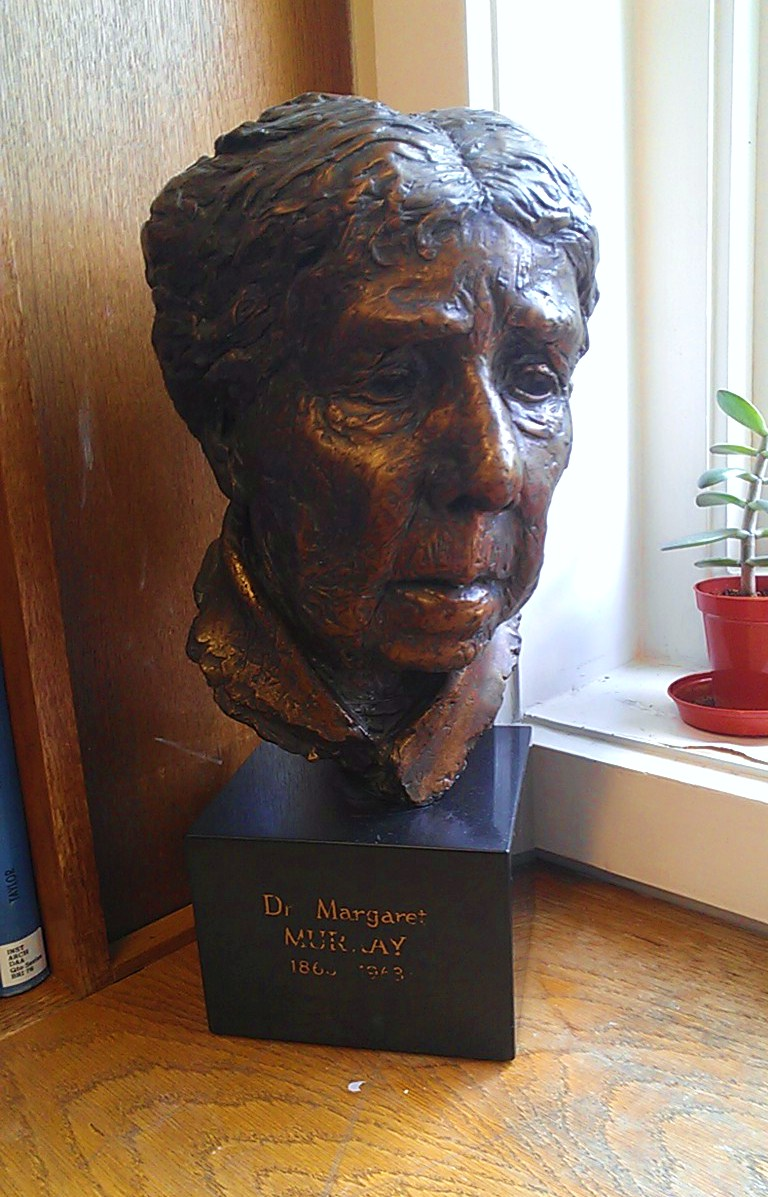
Bust of Murray held in the library of the UCL Institute of Archaeology. The bronze cast was produced by Stephen Rickard after having been commissioned by Murray's student Violet MacDermot.

On researching the history of UCL's Egyptology department, the historian Rosalind M. Janssen stated that Murray was "remembered with gratitude and immense affection by all her former students. A wise and witty teacher, two generations of Egyptologists have forever been in her debt." Alongside teaching them, Murray was known to socialise with her UCL students outside of class hours.

Archaeologist Ralph Merrifield, who knew Murray through the Folklore Society, described her as a "diminutive and kindly scholar, who radiated intelligence and strength of character into extreme old age". Davidson, who also knew Murray through the Society, noted that at their meetings "she would sit near the front, a bent and seemingly guileless old lady dozing peacefully, and then in the middle of a discussion would suddenly intervene with a relevant and penetrating comment which showed that she had missed not one word of the argument". The later folklorist Juliette Wood noted that many members of the Folklore Society "remember her fondly", adding that Murray had been "especially keen to encourage younger researchers, even those who disagreed with her ideas".

One of Murray's friends in the Society, E. O. James, described her as a "mine of information and a perpetual inspiration ever ready to impart her vast and varied stores of specialised knowledge without reserve, or, be it said, much if any regard for the generally accepted opinions and conclusions of the experts!" Davidson described her as being "not at all assertive [...] [she] never thrust her ideas on anyone. [In relation to her witch-cult theory,] she behaved in fact rather like someone who was a fully convinced member of some unusual religious sect, or perhaps, of the Freemasons, but never on any account got into arguments about it in public." The archaeologist Glyn Daniel observed that Murray remained mentally alert into her old age, commenting that "her vigour and forthrightness and ruthless energy never deserted her".

Murray never married, instead devoting her life to her work, and for this reason, Hutton drew comparisons between her and two other prominent female British scholars of the period, Jane Harrison and Jessie Weston. Murray's biographer Kathleen L. Sheppard stated that she was deeply committed to public outreach, particularly when it came to Egyptology, and that as such she "wanted to change the means by which the public obtained knowledge about Egypt's history: she wished to throw open the doors to the scientific laboratory and invite the public in". She considered travel to be one of her favourite activities, although due to restraints on her time and finances she was unable to do this regularly; her salary remained small and the revenue from her books was meagre.

Raised a devout Christian by her mother, Murray had initially become a Sunday School teacher to preach the faith, but after entering the academic profession she rejected religion, gaining a reputation among other members of the Folklore Society as a noted sceptic and a rationalist. She was openly critical of organised religion, although continued to maintain a personal belief in a God of some sort, relating in her autobiography that she believed in "an unseen over-ruling Power", "which science calls Nature and religion calls God". She was also a believer and a practitioner of magic, performing curses against those she felt deserved it; in one case she cursed a fellow academic, Jaroslav Černý, when she felt that his promotion to the position of Professor of Egyptology over her friend Walter Bryan Emery was unworthy. Her curse entailed mixing up ingredients in a frying pan, and was undertaken in the presence of two colleagues. In another instance, she was said to have created a wax image of Kaiser Wilhelm II and then melted it during the First World War. Ruth Whitehouse argues that, given Murray's lack of mention of such incidents in her autobiography and generally rational approach, a "spirit of mischief" as opposed to "a real belief in the efficacy of the spells" may have motivated her practice of magic.

== Legacy ==
=== In academia ===
Hutton noted that Murray was one of the earliest women to "make a serious impact upon the world of professional scholarship", and the archaeologist Niall Finneran described her as "one of the greatest characters of post-war British archaeology". Upon her death, Daniel referred to her as "the Grand Old Woman of Egyptology", with Hutton noting that Egyptology represented "the core of her academic career". In 2014, Thornton referred to her as "one of Britain's most famous Egyptologists".

However, according to the archaeologist Ruth Whitehouse, Murray's contributions to archaeology and Egyptology were often overlooked as her work was overshadowed by that of Petrie, to the extent that she was often thought of primarily as one of Petrie's assistants rather than as a scholar in her own right. By her retirement she had come to be highly regarded within the discipline, although, according to Whitehouse, Murray's reputation declined following her death, something that Whitehouse attributed to the rejection of her witch-cult theory and the general erasure of women archaeologists from the discipline's male-dominated history.

No British folklorist can remember Dr Margaret Murray without embarrassment and a sense of paradox. She is one of the few folklorists whose name became widely known to the public, but among scholars, her reputation is deservedly low; her theory that witches were members of a huge secret society preserving a prehistoric fertility cult through the centuries is now seen to be based on deeply flawed methods and illogical arguments. The fact that, in her old age and after three increasingly eccentric books, she was made President of the Folklore Society, must certainly have harmed the reputation of the Society and possibly the status of folkloristics in this country; it helps to explain the mistrust some historians still feel towards our discipline.

— Jacqueline Simpson, 1994.

In his obituary for Murray in Folklore, James noted that her death was "an event of unusual interest and importance in the annals of the Folk-Lore Society in particular as well as in the wider sphere in which her influence was felt in so many directions and disciplines". However, later academic folklorists, such as Simpson and Wood, have cited Murray and her witch-cult theory as an embarrassment to their field, and to the Folklore Society specifically. Simpson suggested that Murray's position as President of the Society was a causal factor in the mistrustful attitude that many historians held toward folkloristics as an academic discipline, as they erroneously came to believe that all folklorists endorsed Murray's ideas. Similarly, Catherine Noble stated that "Murray caused considerable damage to the study of witchcraft".

In 1935, UCL introduced the Margaret Murray Prize, awarded to the student who is deemed to have produced the best dissertation in Egyptology; it continued to be presented annually into the 21st century. In 1969, UCL named one of their common rooms in her honour, but it was converted into an office in 1989.

In June 1983, Queen Elizabeth the Queen Mother visited the room and there was gifted a copy of Murray's My First Hundred Years. UCL also hold two busts of Murray, one kept in the Petrie Museum and the other in the library of the UCL Institute of Archaeology. This sculpture was commissioned by one of her students, Violet MacDermot, and produced by the artist Stephen Rickard. UCL also possess a watercolour painting of Murray by Winifred Brunton; formerly exhibited in the Petrie Gallery, it was later placed into the Art Collection stores. In 2013, on the 150th anniversary of Murray's birth and the 50th of her death, the UCL Institute of Archaeology's Ruth Whitehouse described Murray as "a remarkable woman" whose life was "well worth celebrating, both in the archaeological world at large and especially in UCL".

The historian of archaeology Rosalind M. Janssen titled her study of Egyptology at UCL The First Hundred Years "as a tribute" to Murray. Murray's friend Margaret Stefana Drower authored a short biography of her, which was included as a chapter in the 2004 edited volume on Breaking Ground: Pioneering Women Archaeologists. In 2013, Lexington Books published The Life of Margaret Alice Murray: A Woman's Work in Archaeology, a biography of Murray authored by Kathleen L. Sheppard, then an assistant professor at Missouri University of Science and Technology; the book was based upon Sheppard's doctoral dissertation produced at the University of Oklahoma. Although characterising it as being "written in a clear and engaging manner", one reviewer noted that Sheppard's book focuses on Murray the "scientist" and as such neglects to discuss Murray's involvement in magical practices and her relationship with Wicca.

=== In Wicca ===
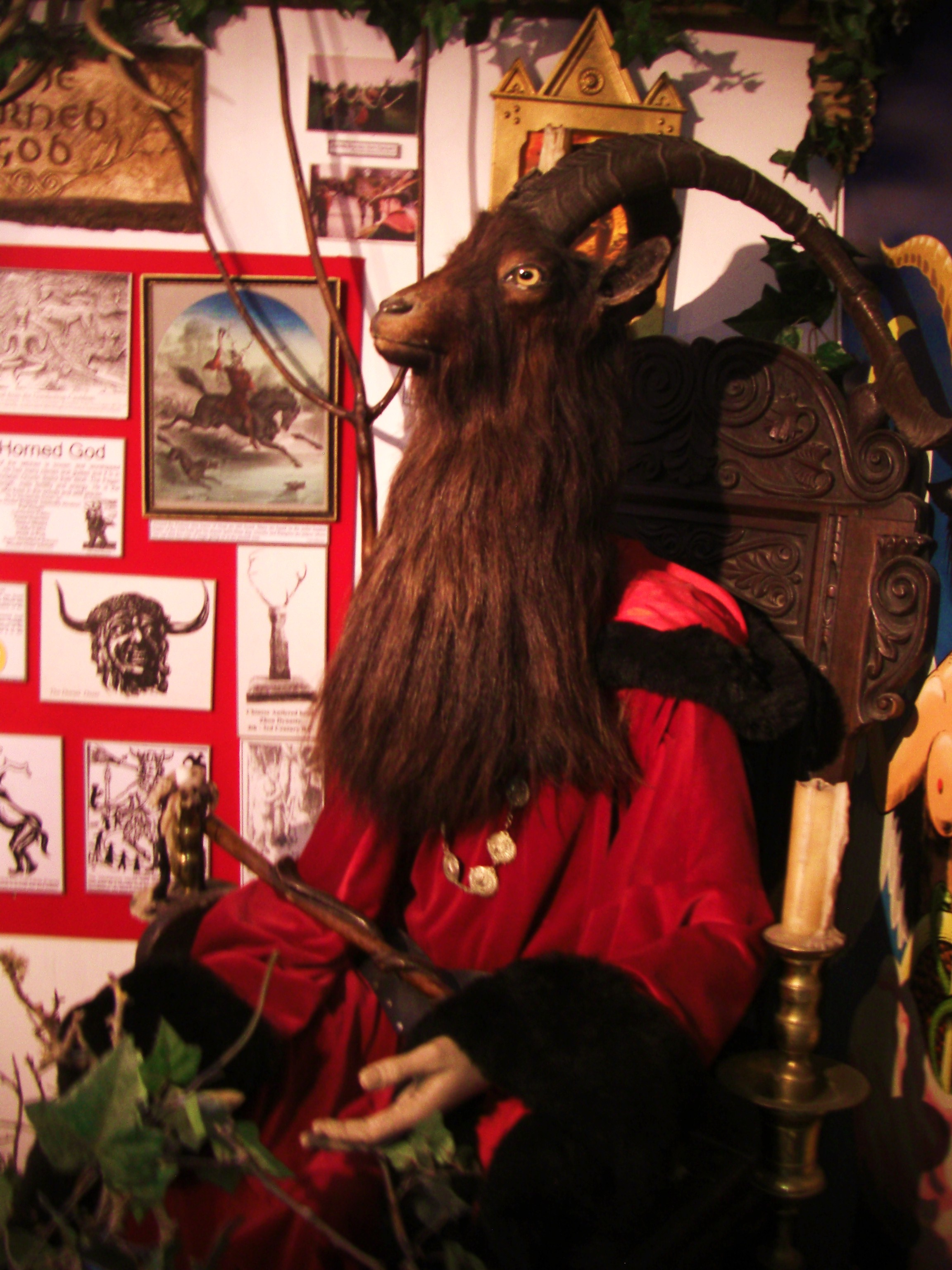
A sculpture of the Horned God of Wicca found in the Museum of Witchcraft and Magic in Boscastle, Cornwall

Murray's witch-cult theories provided the blueprint for the contemporary Pagan religion of Wicca, with Murray being referred to as the "Grandmother of Wicca". The Pagan studies scholar Ethan Doyle White stated that it was the theory which "formed the historical narrative around which Wicca built itself", for on its emergence in England during the 1940s and 1950s, Wicca claimed to be the survival of this witch-cult. Wicca's theological structure, revolving around a Horned God and Mother Goddess, was adopted from Murray's ideas about the ancient witch-cult, and Wiccan groups were named covens and their meetings termed esbats, both words that Murray had popularised. As with Murray's witch-cult, Wicca's practitioners entered via an initiation ceremony; Murray's claims that witches wrote down their spells in a book may have been an influence on Wicca's Book of Shadows. Wicca's early system of seasonal festivities were also based on Murray's framework.

Noting that there is no evidence of Wicca existing before the publication of Murray's books, Merrifield commented that for those in 20th century Britain who wished to form their own witches' covens, "Murray may have seemed the ideal fairy godmother, and her theory became the pumpkin coach that could transport them into the realm of fantasy for which they longed". The historian Philip Heselton suggested that the New Forest coven – the oldest alleged Wiccan group – was founded circa 1935 by esotericists aware of Murray's theory and who may have believed themselves to be reincarnated witch-cult members. It was Gerald Gardner, who claimed to be an initiate of the New Forest coven, who established the tradition of Gardnerian Wicca and popularised the religion; according to Simpson, Gardner was the only member of the Folklore Society to "wholeheartedly" accept Murray's witch-cult hypothesis. The duo knew each other, with Murray writing the foreword to Gardner's 1954 book Witchcraft Today, although in that foreword she did not explicitly specify whether she believed Gardner's claim that he had discovered a survival of her witch-cult. In 2005, Noble suggested that "Murray's name might be all but forgotten today if it were not for Gerald Gardner".

As the religion [of Wicca] emerged, many practitioners saw those who suffered in the [witch trials of the Early Modern] as their forebears, thus adopting the Murrayite witch-cult hypothesis which provided Wicca with a history stretching back far into the reaches of the ancient past. As historians challenged and demolished this theory in the 1960s and 1970s, many Wiccans were shocked. Some accepted that the theory was not actually legitimate, instead portraying the Murrayite story as a mythical history for the Craft and seeking to emphasise the religion's other historical antecessors. Other practitioners however vehemently defended Murray's hypothesis against academic critique, viewing it as a significant article of faith.

— Ethan Doyle White, 2016.

Murray's witch-cult theories were likely also a core influence on the non-Gardnerian Wiccan traditions that were established in Britain and Australia between 1930 and 1970 by the likes of Bob Clay-Egerton, Robert Cochrane, Charles Cardell, and Rosaleen Norton. The prominent Wiccan Doreen Valiente eagerly searched for what she believed were other surviving remnants of the Murrayite witch-cult around Britain. Valiente remained committed to a belief in Murray's witch-cult after its academic rejection, and she described Murray as "a remarkable woman".

In San Francisco during the late 1960s, Murray's writings were among the sources used by Aidan A. Kelly in the creation of his Wiccan tradition, the New Reformed Orthodox Order of the Golden Dawn. In Los Angeles during the early 1970s, they were used by Zsuzsanna Budapest when she was establishing her feminist-oriented tradition of Dianic Wicca. The Murrayite witch-cult theory also provided the basis for the ideas espoused in Witchcraft and the Gay Counterculture, a 1978 book written by the American gay liberation activist Arthur Evans.

Members of the Wiccan community gradually became aware of academia's rejection of the witch-cult theory. Accordingly, belief in its literal truth declined during the 1980s and 1990s, with many Wiccans instead coming to view it as a myth that conveyed metaphorical or symbolic truths. Others insisted that the historical origins of the religion did not matter and that instead Wicca was legitimated by the spiritual experiences it gave to its participants. In response, Hutton authored The Triumph of the Moon, a historical study exploring Wicca's early development; on publication in 1999 the book exerted a strong impact on the British Pagan community, further eroding belief in the Murrayite theory among Wiccans. Conversely, other practitioners clung on to the theory, treating it as an important article of faith and rejecting post-Murrayite scholarship on European witchcraft. Several prominent practitioners continued to insist that Wicca was a religion with origins stretching back to the Palaeolithic, but others rejected the validity of historical scholarship and emphasised intuition and emotion as the arbiter of truth. A few "counter-revisionist" Wiccans – among them Donald H. Frew, Jani Farrell-Roberts, and Ben Whitmore – published critiques in which they attacked post-Murrayite scholarship on matters of detail, but none defended Murray's original hypothesis completely.

=== In literature ===
Simpson noted that the publication of the Murray thesis in the Encyclopædia Britannica made it accessible to "journalists, film-makers, popular novelists, and thriller writers", who adopted it "enthusiastically". It influenced the work of Aldous Huxley and Robert Graves. Murray's ideas shaped the depiction of paganism in the work of historical novelist Rosemary Sutcliff. Murray's ideas about religion can also be discerned in the fictions of another British historical novelist, Henry Treece. It was also an influence on the American horror author H. P. Lovecraft, who cited The Witch-Cult in Western Europe in his writings about the fictional cult of Cthulhu. Another horror writer, Dennis Wheatley, incorporated Murray's ideas about witchcraft into his novel The Devil Rides Out and cited Murray's work in his non-fiction book on the occult, The Devil and all his Works.

The author Sylvia Townsend Warner cited Murray's work on the witch-cult as an influence on her 1926 novel Lolly Willowes, and sent a copy of her book to Murray in appreciation, with the two meeting for lunch shortly after. There was nevertheless some difference in their depictions of the witch-cult; whereas Murray had depicted an organised pre-Christian cult, Warner depicted a vague family tradition that was explicitly Satanic. In 1927, Warner lectured on the subject of witchcraft, exhibiting a strong influence from Murray's work. Analysing the relationship between Murray and Warner, the English literature scholar Mimi Winick characterised both as being "engaged in imagining new possibilities for women in modernity".

The fantasy novel Lammas Night is based on the same idea of the role of the royal family.

== Collections ==
University College London Special Collections holds an archive of correspondence to Murray and to other members of the Murray family written between 1857 - 1926.

== Bibliography ==
A bibliography of Murray's published work was published in Folklore by Wilfrid Bonser in 1961, her friend Drower produced a posthumous limited bibliography in 2004, and another limited bibliography appeared in Kathleen L. Sheppard's 2013 biography of her.

Year of publication	Title	Co-authors	Publisher
1903	Guide to the Collection of Egyptian Antiquities	—	Edinburgh Museum of Science and Art (Edinburgh)
1904	The Osireion at Abydos	—	Egyptian Research Account (London)
1905	Saqqara Mastabas. Part I; Part II.	With chapters by Kurt Sethe	Bernard Quaritch (London)
1905	Saqqara Mastabas Part I and Gurob	Gurob by L. Loat	Egyptian Research Account (London)
1905	Elementary Egyptian Grammar	—	University College Press (London)
1908	Index of Names and Titles of the Old Kingdom	—	British School of Archaeology in Egypt (London)
1910	The Tomb of the Two Brothers	—	Sheratt & Hughes (Manchester)
1911	Elementary Coptic (Sahidic) Grammar (2nd ed. 1927)	—	University College Press (London)
1913	Ancient Egyptian Legends	—	John Murray (London); The Wisdom of the East Series
1921	The Witch-Cult in Western Europe: A Study in Anthropology	—	Oxford University Press (Oxford)
1923	Excavations in Malta, Part I	—	Bernard Quaritch (London)
1925	Excavations in Malta, Part II	—	Bernard Quaritch (London)
1929	Excavations in Malta, Part III	—	Bernard Quaritch (London)
1930	Egyptian Sculpture	—	Duckworth (London)
1931	Egyptian Temples	—	Sampson Low, Marston & Co. (London)
1931	The God of the Witches (Ed/1960)	—	Faber & Faber (London)
1932	Maltese Folk-Tales	L. Galea	Empire Press (Malta)
1933	A Coptic Reading Book, with Glossary, for the Use of Beginners	Dorothy Pilcher	Bernard Quaritch (London)
1934	Cambridge Excavations in Minorca, Sa Torreta	—	Bernard Quaritch (London)
1934	Corpus of the Bronze-Age Pottery of Malta	Horace Beck and Themosticles Zammit	Bernard Quaritch (London)
1937	Saqqara Mastabas Part II	—	Egyptian Research Account (London)
1938	Cambridge Excavations in Minorca, Trapucó	—	Bernard Quaritch (London)
1939	Petra, the Rock City of Edom	—	Blackie
1940	A Street in Petra	J. C. Ellis	British School of Archaeology in Egypt and Bernard Quaritch
1949	Ancient Egyptian Religious Poetry	—	John Murray (London)
1949	The Splendour that was Egypt: A General Survey of Egyptian Culture and Civilisation	—	Philosophical Library (London)
1954	The Divine King of England. A Study in Anthropology	—	Faber & Faber (London)
1963	My First Hundred Years	—	William Kimber & Co. (London)
1963	The Genesis of Religion	—	Kegan Paul (London)

== See also ==
- Johann Jakob Bachofen
- Howard Carter
- James Frazer
- René Girard
- Robert Graves
- Flinders Petrie
