= The Pagan Religions of the Ancient British Isles =

Book by Ronald Hutton

The Pagan Religions of the Ancient British Isles: Their Nature and Legacy
- The first edition cover of Hutton's book.
- Author: Ronald Hutton
- Language: English
- Subject: Religious history
- Publisher: Blackwell
- Publication date: 1991
- Publication place: United Kingdom
- Media type: Print (hardback & paperback)

The Pagan Religions of the Ancient British Isles: Their Nature and Legacy is a book of religious history and archaeology written by the English historian Ronald Hutton, first published by Blackwell in 1991. It was the first published synthesis of the entirety of pre-Christian religion in the British Isles, dealing with the subject during the Palaeolithic, Neolithic, Bronze Age, Iron Age, Roman occupation and Anglo-Saxon period. It then proceeds to make a brief examination of their influence on folklore and contemporary Paganism.

In keeping with what was by then the prevailing academic view, it disputed the widely held idea that ancient paganism had survived into the contemporary and had been revived by the Pagan movement. In turn, it proved somewhat controversial among some sectors of the Pagan community, with two prominent members of the Goddess movement, Asphodel Long and Max Dashu publishing criticisms of it.

== Background ==
Hutton was born at Ootacamund in India to a colonial family, and is of part-Russian ancestry. Upon arriving in England, he attended Ilford County High School, whilst becoming greatly interested in archaeology, joining the committee of a local archaeological group and taking part in excavations from 1965 to 1976, including at such sites as Pilsdon Pen hill fort, Ascott-under-Wychwood long barrow, Hen Domen castle and a temple on Malta. Meanwhile, during the period between 1966 and 1969, he visited "every prehistoric chambered tomb surviving in England and Wales, and wrote a guide to them, for myself [Hutton] and friends." Despite his love of archaeology, he instead decided to study history at university, believing that he had "probably more aptitude" for it. He won a scholarship to study at Pembroke College, Cambridge, where he continued his interest in archaeology alongside history, in 1975 taking a course run by the university's archaeologist Glyn Daniel, an expert on the Neolithic. From Cambridge, he went on to study at Oxford University, where he held a fellowship at Magdalen College.

In 1981, Hutton moved to the University of Bristol where he took up the position of reader of History. In that year he also published his first book, The Royalist War Effort 1642–1646, and followed it with three more books on 17th century British history by 1990.

== Synopsis ==
In this work, Hutton attempted to "set out what is at present known about the religious beliefs and practices of the British Isles before their conversion to Christianity. The term 'pagan' is used as a convenient shorthand for those beliefs and practices, and is employed in the title merely to absolve the book from any need to discuss early Christianity itself." The book contains chapters entitled The Mysteries Begin (c. 30,000 – c.5000 BC), The Time of Tombs (c. 5000 – c. 3200 BC), The Coming of the Circles (c. 3200 – c.2200 BC), Into the Darkness (c.2200 – c.1000 BC), The People of the Mist (c.1000 BC – c. AD 500), The Imperial Synthesis (AD 43 – 410) The Clash of Faiths (AD c.300 – c.1000), and Legacy of Shadows.

== Reception ==
Dealing with both ancient pre-Christian religion and its influence on the contemporary Pagan, or 'Neo-Pagan' new religious movement, The Pagan Religions of the British Isles prompted various reactions from members of the contemporary Pagan community, both positive and negative.

The book proved controversial amongst some contemporary Pagans and feminists involved in the Goddess movement, one of whom, Asphodel Long, issued a public criticism of Hutton in which she charged him with failing to take non-mainstream ideas about ancient goddess cults into consideration. Ultimately, Hutton would later relate, she "recognised that she had misunderstood me" and the two became friends. Feminist historian Max Dashu condemned the work as containing "factual errors, mischaracterizations, and outright whoppers" and claimed that she was "staggered by the intense anti-feminism of this book." She criticized Hutton's writing style as "dry as dust" and said she was "sorry I bothered to plough through it. If this is rigor, it is mortis."

Other Pagans were less critical of Hutton's work. One American Pagan named Lorena Wolfe commented that the book touched "at the basis of our belief system – our symbology, our festivals, our view of our history, and our vision of the Goddess Herself", but ultimately she recognised that "Mr. Hutton seems, overall, to be reasonably sympathetic to those with neo-pagan beliefs".

Meanwhile, whilst he faced criticism from some sectors of the Pagan community in Britain, others came to embrace him; during the late 1980s and 1990s, Hutton befriended a number of practising British Pagans, including "leading Druids" such as Tim Sebastion, who was then Chief of the Secular Order of Druids. On the basis of The Pagan Religions of the Ancient British Isles (which he himself had not actually read), Sebastion invited Hutton to speak at a conference in Avebury where he befriended a number of members of the Pagan Druidic movement, including Philip Carr-Gomm, Emma Restall Orr and John Michell. In later years, Hutton would write further historical studies of the contemporary Pagan movement, producing The Triumph of the Moon: A History of Modern Pagan Witchcraft (1999) and Blood and Mistletoe: The History of the Druids in Britain (2009). In 2011, a writer for the New Age magazine Kindred Spirit noted that Hutton had become a "well-known and much loved figure" in the British Pagan community.
