= Stephen Finney Mason =

British chemist and historian of science

Stephen Finney Mason FRS FRSC
- Born: 6 July 1923; Leicestershire, England
- Died: 11 December 2007 (aged 84); Cambridge, England
- Occupation: Professor of Chemistry
- Spouses: (1) Bridget Irene Sutton (2) Joan Banus

Stephen Finney Mason FRS FRSC (6 July 1923 – 11 December 2007) was a British chemist and historian of science.

== Biography ==
Stephen Finney Mason was born in Leicestershire on 6 July 1923, the first child of Leonard Stephen Mason, a garage owner, and Chrissie Harriette (née Finney). He won a scholarship to Wyggeston Grammar School from 1933 to 1941; from there he gained an open scholarship to Wadham College, Oxford. He graduated with a first-class degree in 1945 and, in 1947, was awarded a DPhil on the biological activity of antimalarials, supervised by Dalziel Hammick.

Mason had hoped to continue research in the chemistry department, but his attempt to find a position was blocked by Robert Robinson as the result of a dispute between Robertson and Hammick. He turned, instead, to the history of science.

In 1947 he was invited by F. Sherwood Taylor, the curator of the History of Science Museum, Oxford to join his staff as a departmental demonstrator (junior lecturer), on condition that he also became the secretary and treasurer of the Society for the Study of Alchemy and Early Chemistry. His role in the museum was to give lectures of general interest on the history of science, which required greatly expanding his reading and knowledge. In 1953 he published A History of the Sciences, a book that has been reprinted 27 times and translated into seven languages.

Throughout this time, though, Mason was concerned that he was slipping further away from the bench; and he was also aware that Oxford would not welcome him back as a research scientist.

He was offered a fellowship by Adrien Albert, the head of the Department of Medical Chemistry at the ANU, which was temporarily based in the Wellcome Institute in London. In 1953 Mason joined the man whose work he had long admired, where he was put in charge of a new suite of spectroscopic instruments. In 1955 he had to move to UCL (his lab at the Wellcome was needed by the Institute), where he had the chance to improve his understanding of quantum chemistry and molecular spectroscopy.

Work on the new labs in Canberra was finished in 1956, and Albert returned to the ANU. Mason was offered the chance of a post there but, for various reasons, it did not work out. Instead, he went to the University of Exeter as a lecturer in physical-organic chemistry. During his time there he worked on chirality. Mason was promoted to Reader in 1963.

He moved to a foundation chair of Chemistry at the University of East Anglia in 1964. His appointment was as Professor of Inorganic and Theoretical Chemistry, "a position that he felt did not accord well with his polymathematical inclinations." He moved to a chair of chemistry at King's College London in late 1969, where he remained until retirement in 1988. He was made a Fellow of the Royal Society in 1982.

On his retirement, Stephen Mason and his wife moved to Cambridge where, for the next couple of years he worked on his book Chemical evolution: origins of the elements, molecules and living systems, supported by a Leverhulme Emeritus Fellowship.

== Family ==
During his time at the Museum of the History of Science, Mason joined Christopher Hill's Communist Party Historians Group. Another member was Bridget Irene Sutton; they married on 31 December 1949. The marriage did not last, and the couple parted on friendly terms. Bridget later married Hill, while Stephen married Joan Banus in 1955. She had been working at UCL while he was at ANU. They had three sons in the next five years: Oliver Neil, Andrew Lawrence and Lionel Jeremy, all of whom have successful careers in their fields.

Joan died on 20 March 2004, and was cremated in Cambridge on 31 March. Stephen died on 11 December 2007.
