= British School of Archaeology in Egypt =

British School of Archaeology in Egypt (BSAE), was an organisation established in 1905 as initiative by Flinders Petrie, Edwards Professor of Egyptian Archaeology and Philology at University College London. It lasted until 1954.

It had the following objectives:

1. To conduct excavations and pay all expences [sic] incidental thereto.
2. To discover and acquire antiquities and to distribute the same to public museums.
3. To publish works.
4. To hold exhibitions.
5. To promote the training and assistance of students.

The organisation adopted the principles of the Egyptian Exploration Fund as regards the distribution of archaeological finds amongst supporting museums:

"Antiquities not claimed by the Egyptian Government shall be divided entirely among public museums, excepting large numbers of similar objects which may be given to the subscribers. In distribution to Museums the total of contributions from any place or district shall be taken into account, after deducting from those amounts one guinea for each volume of publication given on account of those contributions."

== Publications ==
=== Ancient Egypt ===
Ancient Egypt was a journal published between 1914 and 1932 under the imprint of Macmillan Publishers. Publication was suspended for 1918 and 1919.

- Ancient Egypt 1914-17
- Ancient Egypt 1920-23

=== Other publications ===
The BSAE include:

- 1909 Memphis I W. Flinders Petrie, and J. H. Walker
- 1909 The Palace of Apries (Memphis II) Flinders Petrie, and J. H. Walker
- 1910 Meydum and Memphis (III) W. Flinders Petrie, Ernest J. H. Mackay and Gerald Avery Wainwright
- 1911 Roman Portraits and Memphis (IV) Flinders Petrie
- 1913 Tarkhan I And Memphis V Flinders Petrie and Gerald Avery Wainwright
- 1915 Riqqeh and Memphis VI, Reginald Engelbach, Margaret Murray, W. Flinders Petrie and H. Flinders Petrie
