= God's Englishman: Oliver Cromwell and the English Revolution =

God's Englishman: Oliver Cromwell and the English Revolution is a 1970 historical study by Christopher Hill that examines the life and political role of Oliver Cromwell within the context of the English Civil War. The book posited Cromwell as having a tension between his radical Protestantism and a deep social conservatism.

== Bibliography ==
- Hill, Christopher (1970). God's Englishman: Oliver Cromwell and the English Revolution. ISBN 0-297-00043-8.
- Hunt, Tristram (30 August 2013). "Rereading God's Englishman by Christopher Hill". The Guardian.
