= Bridget Hill (historian) =

Bridget Irene Hill
- Born: Bridget Irene Sutton; 15 April 1922; Middlesex
- Died: 21 July 2002 (aged 80)
- Education: London School of Economics
- Notable work: Eighteenth Century Women: An Anthology; The First English Feminist; The Republican Virago; Women, Work, and Sexual Politics in Eighteenth-Century England; Servants: English Domestics in the Eighteenth Century; Women Alone: Spinsters in England, 1660-1850

Bridget Irene Hill (15 April 1922 – 31 July 2002) was a feminist historian of the seventeenth and eighteenth centuries.

== Early life ==
Hill was born Bridget Irene Sutton in Middlesex, the daughter of a Baptist minister.

== Education and politics ==
She went to school at Godolphin and Latymer School in Hammersmith and attended university at the London School of Economics, studying economic history. Hill joined the Communist Party during her time at the London School of Economics in World War II. She went to Prague on a scholarship in 1949. Both her first husband, Stephen Finney Mason (1923–2007), and her second husband, Christopher Hill (1912–2003) were both members of the Communist Party. Hill would later leave the Communist Party.

== Published works ==
Hill and her husband Christopher co-authored a paper entitled Catherine Macaulay and the Seventeenth Century in 1967 about the early female historian, Catherine Macaulay. Hill published in 1992 a full book on Macaulay, entitled The Republican Virago.

Hill's other works included Eighteenth Century Women: an Anthology (1984); Women, Work and Sexual Politics in Eighteenth-Century England (1989); Servants: English Domestics in the Eighteenth Century (1996), and Women Alone: Spinsters in England, 1660-1850 (2001).
