= The World Turned Upside Down: Radical Ideas During the English Revolution =

1987 book by Christopher Hill

- Author: Christopher Hill
- Subject: History
- Publisher: Maurice Temple Smith Ltd
- Publication date: 1972
- Publication place: United Kingdom

The World Turned Upside Down: Radical Ideas During the English Revolution is a book by the British historian Christopher Hill, published in 1972 and republished many times since. It offers a "history from below" perspective on the English Civil Wars focussing on the ordinary people that participated in radical religious groups such as the Diggers, the Seekers, the Ranters, the Quakers and the Levellers.

Bhogal & Haydon (2017) in their book An Analysis of Christopher Hill's The World Turned Upside Down: Radical Ideas During the English Revolution argue that Hill has inspired and influenced a whole generation of historians in the study of the English Revolution and the approach to be taken. They argue that Hill argues that to be able to understand what the Revolution was really like we need to understand intellectual currents which lay behind many of the actions taken and this is what he provides.

== Contents ==
Preface

1. Introduction
2. The Parchment and the Fire
3. Masterless Men
4. Agitators and Officers
5. The North and West
6. A Nation of Prophets
7. Levellers and True Levellers
8. Sin and Hell
9. Seekers and Ranters
10. Ranters and Quakers
11. Samuel Fisher and the Bible
12. John Warr and the Law
13. The Island of Great Bedlam
14. Mechanic Preachers and the Mechanical Philosophy
15. Base Impudent Kisses
16. Life Against Death
17. The World Restored
18. Conclusion

Appendices:

1. Hobbes and Winstanley: Reason and Politics
2. Milton and Bunyan: Dialogue with the Radicals

== Reviews ==
- Bhogal, H., & Haydon, L. (2017). An Analysis of Christopher Hill's The World Turned Upside Down: Radical Ideas During the English Revolution (1st ed.). Macat Library. https://doi.org/10.4324/9781912281497
- Whittaker, Peter (1999) Review: The world turned upside down: radical ideas during the English revolution, Hill, Christopher ; New internationalist, (313), p.33
- Schlatter, Richard (1973) "The World Turned Upside Down: Radical Ideas during the English Revolution" (Book Review) The American historical review, 1973, Vol.78 (4), p.1052
- Thomas, Keith (1972) "The World Turned Upside Down: Radical Ideas During the English Revolution" by Christopher Hill (Book Review), The New York review of books, Vol.19 (9), p.26
- Guggisberg, Hans R. (1974) The World Turned Upside down - Radical Ideas during the English Revolution, Historische Zeitschrift, Vol.219 (1), p.226-228
