= Barry Reay =

New Zealand historian

Barry Reay (born 17 January 1950), now retired, was formerly professor of history at the University of Auckland, New Zealand. He is a specialist in the history of sex and gender.

== Selected publications ==
=== Edited ===
- Radical Religion in the English Revolution, Oxford University Press, 1984. (With J. F. McGregor)
- Popular Culture in Seventeenth-Century England, St. Martin's, 1985.
- Sexualities in History: A Reader, Routledge, 2002.(With Kim Phillips)

=== Authored ===
- The World of the Muggletonians, Temple Smith, 1983. (With Christopher Hill and William Lamont)
- The Quakers and the English Revolution, St. Martin's, 1985.
- The Last Rising of the Agricultural Labourers: Rural Life and Protest in Nineteenth-Century England, Oxford University Press, 1990.
- Microhistories: Demography, Society, and Culture in Rural England, 1800-1930, Cambridge University Press, 1996.
- Popular Cultures in England, 1550-1750, Longman, 1998.
- Watching Hannah: Sexuality, Horror and Bodily Deformation in Victorian England, Reaktion, 2002.
- Rural Englands: Labouring Lives in the Nineteenth Century, Palgrave, 2004.
- New York Hustlers: Masculinity and Sex in Modern America, Manchester University Press, 2010.
- Sex before Sexuality: A Premodern History, Polity Press, 2011. (With Kim Phillips)
- Sex Addiction: A Critical History, Polity Press, 2015. (With Nina Attwood and Claire Gooder)
- Sex in the Archives: Writing American Sexual Histories. Manchester University Press, 2018.
- Trans America: A Counter-History. Polity Press, 2020.
- Dirty Books: Erotic Fiction and the Avant-Garde in Mid-Century Paris and New York. Manchester University Press, 2023. (With Nina Attwood)
