= Max Dashu =

American historian

- Born: Maxine Hammond; 1950 (age 75–76); West Chicago, Illinois, U.S.
- Education: Harvard University
- Occupations: Feminist historian, author, artist
- Years active: 1970–present
- Notable work: Witches and Pagans: Women in European Folk Religion, 700–1100
- Partner: Nava Mizrahhi
- Website: Suppressed Histories Archive

Maxine Hammond Dashu (born 1950), known professionally as Max Dashu, is an American feminist historian, author, and artist. Her areas of expertise include female iconography, mother-right cultures and the origins of patriarchy.

In 1970, Dashu founded the Suppressed Histories Archives to research and document women's history and to make the full spectrum of women's history and culture visible and accessible. The collection includes 15,000 slides and 30,000 digital images. Since the early 1970s, Dashu has delivered visual presentations on women's history throughout North America, Europe and Australia.

Dashu is the author of Witches and Pagans: Women in European Folk Religion, 700–1100 (2016), the first volume of a planned 16-volume series called Secret History of the Witches.

== Early life ==
Dashu grew up in West Chicago, Illinois. In 1968, she earned a full scholarship to Harvard University, where she began her research in women's history. Facing "entrenched resistance" to feminist scholarship, she chose to leave the university to become an independent scholar. After founding the Suppressed Histories Archives in 1970, she began presenting on women's history in 1973, sharing slides of her research at feminist bookstores, cafe and women's centers. Dashu's slide presentations offered visual history at a time when lesbian history and art was not easily accessible.

In 1976, Dashu was involved in the Inez García defense committee. In the early 1980s, Dashu worked in the Household Workers' Rights organization, a Union WAGE project established in 1979 for working women.

== Career ==
=== Historian ===
Dashu's decades-long work has focused on women's history around the world, including Europe, Asia and Africa. Areas of focus include women shamans and priestesses, witches and the witch trials, folk religion and pagan European traditions. Her work has cited evidence in support of egalitarian matrilineages, and she authored a critique of Cynthia Eller's The Myth of Matriarchal Prehistory (2000). Her article "Knocking Down Straw Dolls: A Critique of Cynthia Eller's The Myth of Matriarchal Prehistory" was reprinted in the journal Feminist Theology in 2005. Dashu has also published in the 2011 anthology Goddesses in World Culture, edited by Patricia Monaghan.

In 2016, Dashu published Witches and Pagans: Women in European Folk Religion, 700-1100. The work is the first volume of a 16-part series titled Secret History of the Witches. The series explores the cultural history and suppression of women in Europe, spanning 2,000 years. The next volume, under the working title Pythias, Melissae and Pharmakides, will focus on Greece.

Presenting materials from the Suppressed Histories Archives, Dashu has given talks at hundreds of universities, conferences and festivals around the world. In addition to the images and articles available on her website, Dashu also offers online courses on women's history via webcast.

Dashu served as a historical consultant for Donna Deitch's 1975 documentary Woman to Woman and for the San Francisco Women's Building mural in 1994.

=== Artist ===
Dashu makes feminist paintings, posters and prints. Her art has appeared in Witch Dream Comix (1975), the anthology She Is Everywhere!: An Anthology of Writing in Womanist/Feminist Spirituality (2005), Sinister Wisdom, Daughters of the Moon Tarot, and in books by Judy Grahn, Diane Stein, and Martha Shelley, as well as other feminist, lesbian, and pagan publications. She also provided the illustrations for her book Witches and Pagans and uses her own illustrations to recreate incomplete or damaged artifacts shown in her presentations.

=== Radio ===
From 1980 to 1983, Dashu co-produced the weekly radio program A World Wind with Chana Wilson on KPFA in Berkeley, California. The program featured international women's music, news and culture. In 1981, Dashu produced the women's history program Flashes from Our Past.

== Selected works ==
=== Books ===
- Witch Dream Comix (1975)
- Witches and Pagans: Women in European Folk Religion, 700-1100 (2016)

=== Articles ===
- "Respect and Responsibility: On Cultural Appropriation" in La Gazette (1993)
- Review of Witches and Neighbors: The Social and Cultural Context of European Witchcraft by Robin Briggs (1998)
- "Another View of the Witch Hunts" in The Pomegranate (1999)
- "Women's Studies Beyond Academia" in off our backs (2003)
- "Knocking Down Straw Dolls: A Critique of Eller's The Myth of Matriarchal Prehistory" (originally published 2000, republished in Feminist Theology in 2005)
- "Female Divinities of South America" in Goddesses in World Culture, edited by Patricia Monaghan (2010)
- "Xi Wangmu: The Great Goddess of China" in Goddesses in World Culture, edited by Patricia Monaghan (2010)
- "The Meanings of Goddess" in She Is Everywhere, edited by Mary Saracino and Mary Beth Moser (2011)
- "Raising the Dead: Medicine Women Who Revive and Retrieve Souls I" (2013)
- "Icons of the Matrix: female symbolism in ancient culture" (originally published 2005, updated in 2014)
- "Resurgence" in Foremothers of the Women's Spirituality Movement: Elders and Visionaries, edited by Miriam Robbins Dexter and Vicki Noble (2015)

=== Multimedia ===
- Woman Shaman: The Ancients (2-disc DVD)
- Women's Power (DVD)
- Video courses https://suppressed-histories.teachable.com/
