= Christopher Hill (historian) =

English historian (1912–2003)

- Born: John Edward Christopher Hill; 6 February 1912; York, Yorkshire, England
- Died: 23 February 2003 (aged 91); Chipping Norton, Oxfordshire, England
- Spouse(s): Inez Waugh (née Bartlett); Bridget Irene Mason (née Sutton)
- Children: Four

Academic background
- Education: Balliol College, Oxford

Academic work
- Discipline: Historian
- Sub-discipline: 17th-century English history
- Institutions: All Souls College, Oxford; University College of South Wales and Monmouthshire; Balliol College, Oxford; Open University
- Notable students: Brian Manning; Partha Sarathi Gupta
- Influenced: Ervand Abrahamian

John Edward Christopher Hill (6 February 1912 – 23 February 2003) was an English Marxist historian and academic, specialising in 17th-century English history. From 1965 to 1978 he was Master of Balliol College, Oxford.

== Early life and education ==
Christopher Hill was born on 6 February 1912, Bishopthorpe Road, York, to Edward Harold Hill and Janet Augusta (née Dickinson). His father was a solicitor and the family were devout Methodists; Hill was particularly influenced by the Methodist preacher Theophilus Stevens Gregory, to whom he later dedicated his Intellectual Origins of the English Revolution (1965). He attended St Peter's School, York.

At the age of 16, he sat his entrance examination at Balliol College, Oxford. The two history tutors who marked his papers recognised his ability and offered him a place in order to forestall any chance he might go to the University of Cambridge. In 1931 Hill took a prolonged holiday in Freiburg, Germany, where he witnessed the rise of the Nazi Party, later saying that it contributed significantly to the radicalisation of his politics.

He matriculated at Balliol College in 1931. In the following year he won the Lothian Prize, and he graduated with a first-class Bachelor of Arts degree in modern history in 1934. Whilst at Balliol, Hill became a committed Marxist and joined the Communist Party of Great Britain in the year he graduated.

After graduating he became a Fellow of All Souls College. In 1935 he undertook a ten-month trip to Moscow, Soviet Union. There he became fluent in the Russian language and studied Soviet historical scholarship, particularly that relating to Britain.

Hill has been accused of being a spy for the Soviet Union, particularly via speculation originating with Anthony Glees in his Secrets of the Service (1987). Several academics, including Eric Hobsbawm and John Saville, defended Hill. Further, declassified MI5 documents are reported to have found no evidence of him being a spy.

== Career ==
After returning to England from Russia in 1936, Hill accepted a teaching position as an assistant lecturer at the University College of South Wales and Monmouthshire in Cardiff. During his time there he attempted to join the International Brigade and fight in the Spanish Civil War, but was rejected. Instead, he helped Basque refugees displaced by the war. After two years in Cardiff, he returned to Balliol College in 1938 as a Fellow and tutor in history.

Following the outbreak of the Second World War, he joined the British Army, initially as a private in the Field Security Police. He was commissioned as a second lieutenant in the Oxfordshire and Buckinghamshire Light Infantry on 2 November 1940 with the service number 156590. At around this time Hill started to publish his articles and reviews about 17th-century English history. On 19 October 1941 he was transferred to the Intelligence Corps. He was seconded to the Foreign Office from 1943 until the war ended.

Hill returned to Oxford University after the war to continue his academic work. In 1946 he and other Marxist historians formed the Communist Party Historians Group. In 1949 he applied for the chair of History at the new Keele University, but was turned down because of his Communist Party affiliations. In 1952 he helped to create the academic journal Past and Present.

Hill was becoming discontented with the lack of democracy in the Communist Party. However, he stayed in the party after the Soviet invasion of Hungary in 1956. He left in the spring of 1957 after one of his reports to the party congress was rejected.

After 1956 Hill's academic career continued to ascend. His studies in 17th-century English history were widely acknowledged and recognised. His first academic book, Economic Problems of the Church from Archbishop Whitgift to the Long Parliament, appeared in 1956. Like many of his later books, it was based on his study of printed sources accessible in the Bodleian Library and on secondary works produced by other academic historians, rather than on research in the surviving archives. In 1965 Hill was elected Master of Balliol College. He held the post from 1965 to 1978, when he retired (he was succeeded by Anthony Kenny). Among his students at Balliol was Brian Manning, who went on to do historical research they developed the field’s understanding of the English Revolution. At Oxford, Hill acted as Senior Member of the exclusive Stubbs Society.

Many of Hill's most notable studies focused on 17th-century English history. His books include Puritanism and Revolution (1958), Intellectual Origins of the English Revolution (1965 and revised in 1996), The Century of Revolution (1961), Anti-Christ in 17th-century England (1971) and The World Turned Upside Down (1972).

Hill retired from Balliol in 1978, when he took up a full-time appointment for two years at the Open University. He continued to lecture from his home at Sibford Ferris, Oxfordshire.

== Personal life ==
Hill married his first wife, Inez Waugh (née Bartlett), on 17 January 1944. Inez, then 23, was the daughter of an Army officer, Gordon Bartlett, and the ex-wife of Ian Anthony Waugh. The Hills' marriage broke down after ten years. Their only child, their daughter, Fanny, drowned while holidaying in Spain in 1986.

Hill's second wife was Bridget Irene Mason (née Sutton), whom he married on 2 January 1956. She was the ex-wife of Stephen Mason, a fellow Communist and historian. Their daughter Kate died in a car accident in 1957. They had two other children: Andrew (born 1958) and Dinah (born 1960).

Hill, along with Hobsbawm, was spied on by MI5 for decades. MI5 found that Abraham Lazarus confessed to an affair with Hill's first wife, Inez, in 1948.

In Hill's later years he lived with Alzheimer's disease and required constant care. He died in a nursing home in Chipping Norton, Oxfordshire, on 23 February 2003.

== Selected works ==
- The English Revolution, 1640 (1940, 3rd ed. 1955), ISBN 0-85315-044-3 (On-line text at marxists.org)
- Lenin and the Russian Revolution (1947), ISBN 0-14-013535-9 (1971, 1972, 1993 reprints)
- Economic Problems of the Church: From Archbishop Whitgift to the Long Parliament (1956), ISBN 0-586-03528-1 (1971 reprint)
- Puritanism and Revolution: Studies in Interpretation of the English Revolution of the 17th Century (1958), ISBN 0-7126-6722-9 (2001 reprint)
- The Century of Revolution, 1603–1714 (1961, 2nd. ed. 1980), ISBN 0-17-712002-9
- Society and Puritanism in Pre-Revolutionary England (1964), ISBN 0-7126-6816-0 (2003 reprint)
- Intellectual Origins of the English Revolution (1965, rev. 1997), ISBN 0-19-820668-2
- Reformation to Industrial Revolution: A Social and Economic History of Britain, 1530–1780 (1967, rev. ed. 1969), ISBN 0-14-020897-6
- God's Englishman: Oliver Cromwell and the English Revolution (1970), ISBN 0-297-00043-8
- Antichrist in Seventeenth-Century England (1971, rev. ed. 1990), ISBN 0-86091-997-8
- The World Turned Upside Down: Radical Ideas During the English Revolution (1972), ISBN 0-85117-025-0
- Change and Continuity in Seventeenth-Century England (1974, rev. ed. 1991), ISBN 0-300-05044-5
- Milton and the English Revolution (1977), ISBN 0-571-10198-4
- (with William M. Lamont and Barry Reay) The World of the Muggletonians (1983), ISBN 0-85117-226-1
- The Experience of Defeat: Milton and Some Contemporaries (1984), ISBN 0-571-13237-5
- The Collected Essays of Christopher Hill (3 vols.)
  1. Writing and Revolution in 17th Century England (1985), ISBN 0-7108-0565-9
  2. Religion and Politics in 17th Century England (1986), ISBN 0-7108-0507-1
  3. People and Ideas in 17th Century England (1986), ISBN 0-7108-0512-8
- A Turbulent, Seditious, and Factious People: John Bunyan and His Church, 1628–1688 (1988), ISBN 0-19-812818-5—published in the United States as A Tinker and a Poor Man: John Bunyan and His Church, 1628-1688 (1989), ISBN 0-394-57242-4
- A Nation of Change and Novelty: Radical Politics, Religion and Literature in Seventeenth-Century England (1990), ISBN 0-415-04833-8
- The English Bible and the Seventeenth-Century Revolution (1992), ISBN 0-7139-9078-3
- Liberty Against The Law: Some Seventeenth-Century Controversies (1996), ISBN 0-14-024033-0

== Notes ==
Academic offices
Preceded by David Lindsay Keir	Master of Balliol College, Oxford; 1965–1978	Succeeded by Anthony Kenny
