= Frog coffin =

Item of Finnish folk magic

Frog coffins are burials of frogs in miniature coffins in Finland for the purposes of folk magic. These coffins are known from finds secreted in churches, as well as from references to their use in folk magic at other locations.

== Overview ==
Burials of frogs in miniature coffins were discovered in churches in eastern Finland around the turn of the twentieth century, and were briefly recorded by U. T. Sirelius, who explained them as placed objects with a magical purpose of the stealing the luck of more successful fishermen. A typical size for the coffin was 15 centimetres (5.9 in) long.

Churches where such coffins were found include Kuopio Cathedral (about 32 coffins); Tuusniemi Church (about 100 coffins); Kiihtelysvaara Church (4 coffins); Pielavesi Old Church (coffin and bound frogs); coffins and bound frogs have also been found at Nilsiä Old Church; Heinävesi Old Church; Turku Cathedral; and Bringetofta Church (in Sweden) – along with the coffins other finds included puppets made of alder or birch bark, parts of fishing nets, and textiles.

=== Physical finds ===
One such find was made during restoration work in the choir of Kuopio Cathedral, recorded in the newspaper Savo-Karjala in 1895 – the cathedral itself was consecrated in 1816 – according to the report in Savo-Karjala the 'coffins' had been pushed into the space through ventilation hatches. At the time of discovery some of the coffins were relatively new. Five further coffins were found in 1901, and the find recorded in Savo-Karjala again – the newspaper surmised from the number that the coffins were being added yearly. Two coffins were kept by the National Museum of Finland in Helsinki, and another in the Kuopio Museum – features of these offerings were – a coffin carved from alder wood; a frog inside the coffin; fishing net covering or wrapping the frog; a needle impaling the frog with white thread in the needle; in one case it is thought the frog's mouth had been stitched shut.

Finds with very similar features were found in 1907 at the church in Tuusniemi (b.1869). At the same church similar coffins were found in 1818 in the church's bell tower- these coffins also contained bedbugs, animal hair, or grains. Another find was made in the 1930s under the churches stone foundation.

Possibly related finds include a cat in an alder coffin at Kiihtelysvaara Church, and alder coffins (about 20 centimetres (7.9 in)) containing a carved human figure found at The Old Church of Pielavesi.

Whilst most coffins have been found in eastern Finland an example has been found in the west at Turku Cathedral – this deposit was a 'high quality' work made of varnished pine with cloth, and had the initials 'HM' on the base. Radiocarbon dating, building history, and style have dated this coffin to the late 17th century or early 18th century.

=== Folklore ===
There is extensive recorded folklore concerning the placement of frogs in coffins in eastern Finland, including central Finland, Savo, Karelia, North Ostrobothnia, Kainuu, and as far north as south Lapland – these areas are mostly Lutheran in modern religion, except Karelia which is Orthodox.

Generally the burial of a miniature coffin is a key part of the ritual. The majority of recorded lore is about counter-magic – intended to reflect evil intentions back to those sending them. A lesser part of recorded rituals are malicious in intent – the ritual may be similar to the counter-magic one, but include the burial of an item from the victim in the coffin, though the intent of ritual is also key. In these rituals frogs are the most common animal (about 70%) though others may be used including squirrels, pike, or even a human foetus. Animal substances (milk, feathers, hooves etc.) may have also been buried in a miniature coffin.

In recorded folklore accounts it was thought that such a practise was powerful magic, and could kill an intended victim. Other spells or rituals could be healing, such as a cure for epilepsy which included burying a piece of the afflicted's undergarments with a frog coffin – this cure likely was another form of a protective 'reflective' spell, with the illness assumed caused by malicious sorcery. For example, in a ritual to dispel the problem of cows not returning home at night, recorded from the cunning man Mikko Koljonen (born 1812) of Viitasaari:

This trouble is removed thus that a frog-coffin is made. Before this the frog must be found – it should be a reddish one – and it should be caught with mittens or something else covering the hands; since if the coffin is made before the frog has been caught, what will happen is that no frog will be found at all. Otherwise the coffin will be prepared as explained before.

(First a coffin must be made from a single-growing alder. It should be trough-shaped and the lid, which should have nine holes along the mid-ridge, should be made from the same tree as also eight wooden nails. The red frog, which has not been touched with bare hands, is put on its back in this coffin with its hind legs bound with red thread. Then the lid is put on and fastened with the eight wooden nails and a ninth tar or coffin nail, which is driven in the third hole counted from the head-side, which coincides with the heart of the frog. The lid is not fastened by its rims, only with the nails that have been nailed through the frog all the way into the bottom of the coffin.)

Then some hairs are pulled off each cow three times and put in a rag which is closed with red thread; then the frog-coffin, cow-hair-pouch, and three sharp tools with unknown makers are carried while circling the cowshed twice clockwise and once counter-clockwise while reciting a spell...

A ritual against epilepsy also use a 'frog coffin' – it gives one ritual by which such coffins might end deposited in churches :

Epilepsy was healed in the Kuopio region such that the healer first took the patient with him/her to sit naked on the threshold of a house that had been moved three times. There the healer threw cold water on the patient to startle him/her. Then they went to the forest, caught a frog and killed it. A coffin was made of alder wood. The frog was put like a corpse in shrouds made of a piece of the patient's undergarments inside the coffin. Then the coffin was put under the church through a hatch in the foundation. After this they went to the churchyard, opened a recent grave, and took the body out of the coffin. A hole was dug into the side of the grave. The dead body was split so that the patient could be first pulled through the hole on the side of the grave and then three times through the dead body, switching between clockwise and counter-clockwise. The healer chanted during this: 'Rise all people, people of the air, people of the dead! Come to protect the unprotected, to help the endlessly suffering!' Afterwards the grave was restored.

Frog coffins were believed to keep cattle healthy, if buried near a cattle shed.

== Christian interpretations and influence ==
Both the malicious intent of 'frog coffin' rituals, and also those intended to 'reflect' evil intent back on the sender were at odds with the Christian world view of forgiveness, though the protective use against other persons' malice could co-exist to some extent as it did not harm the innocent. Contemporary newspaper reports of finds of such burials were scathing of such practises occurring and continuing to occur. (Hukantaival 2015, pp. 211–2) notes the use of Christian holy places as geographic focuses for non-Christian practices. It is thought that the Väki ('Power') for these spells may have come from the dead associated with the church and churchyard. In some cases miniature coffin rituals included elements of Christian practice, such as reciting parts of the Lord's Prayer, but not performed by a priest.

== In other cultures ==
The Zhuang people of China idolize the frog – on the first day of the Lunar Year a societal ritual ("Yaogui") takes place including a hunt for hibernating frogs ("Gui"), and their sacrifice and placing in a coffin (of a Bamboo section). On the 25th day after the sacrifice, the frog's bones are exhumed and used to foretell the next harvest.

== See also ==
- Apotropaic magic
- Church grim
- Concealed shoes
- Dried cat
- Horse skulls
- Witch bottle
