= Kitchen witch =

Witch doll

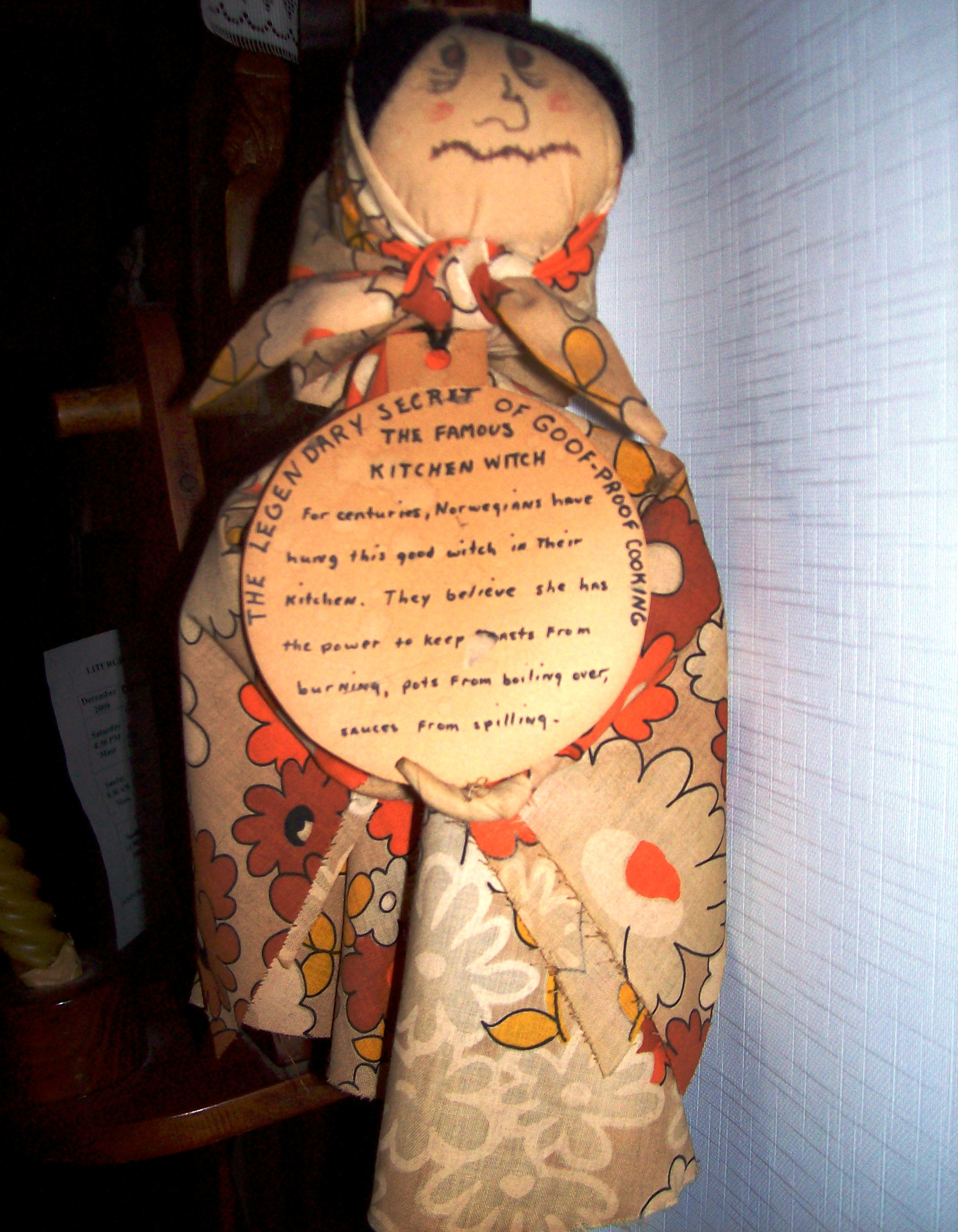
A Norwegian kitchen witch

A kitchen witch, sometimes called a cottage witch is a homemade poppet or doll resembling a stereotypical witch or crone displayed in residential kitchens as a good luck charm and to ward off bad spirits.

== History ==
There is some debate over where the kitchen witch originated, some claiming Scandinavia and others Germany, but consensus points to older Northern European customs, as it seems to have been more widespread earlier.

The poppet is supposed to depict a "good" witch who inspires productivity and safety in a kitchen, but also counteracts any ill-will directed to the home. It is considered good luck to give a kitchen witch to a friend or family member. So that those unfamiliar with the kitchen witch can understand its meaning, sometimes a note will be hung around the witch's neck stating something similar to:

The Legendary Secret of Goof-Proof Cooking: The Famous Kitchen Witch

For centuries, Norwegians have hung this good witch in their kitchen. They believe she has the power to keep roasts from burning, pots from boiling over, and sauces from spilling.

=== In England ===
Although largely unknown in modern England, the kitchen witch was known in England during Tudor times.

The will of John Crudgington, from Newton, Worfield, Shropshire in England, dated 1599, divides his belongings amongst his wife and three children, "except the cubbard in the halle the witche in the kytchyn which I gyve and bequeathe to Roger my sonne."

== See also ==
- Amulet
- Apotropaic magic
- Apotropaic mark
- Concealed shoes
- Cunning folk
- Dream catcher
- European folklore
- Folk religion
- Good luck charm
- Hoko (doll)
- Kitchen Witchcraft
- Mezuzah
- Nazar (amulet)
- Witch bottle
- Witch ball
- Yard globe
