= God's eye =

Artifact created in wood using thread

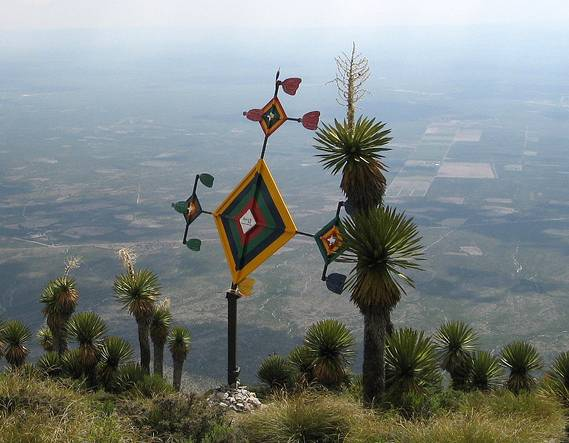
God's eye or Ojo de Dios on Quemado Mountain, San Luis Potosi, Mexico

A God's eye (in Spanish, Ojo de Dios) is a spiritual and votive object made by weaving a design out of yarn upon a wooden cross. Often several colors are used. They are commonly found in Mexican, Peruvian, and Latin American communities, among both Indigenous and Catholic peoples.

Ojos de Dios are common in the Pueblos of New Mexico. Often they reflect a confidence in all-seeing Providence. Some believers think the spiritual eye of the Ojos de Dios has the power to see and understand things unknown to the physical eye. During Spanish colonial times in New Mexico from the 16th to the 19th centuries, Ojos de Dios (God's Eyes) were placed where people worked, or where they walked along a trail.

In other parts of the Americas, artisans weave complicated or variegated versions of the traditional Ojos de Dios, selling them as decorations or religious objects. There has also been a huge increase in the use of Ojos de Dios as an easy and fun craft for children.

The Ojo de Dios or God's eye is a ritual tool that was believed to protect those while they pray, a magical object, and an ancient cultural symbol evoking the weaving motif and its spiritual associations for the Huichol and Tepehuan people of western Mexico. The Huichol or Wixaritari call their God's Eyes Tsikuri, which means "the power to see and understand things unknown." When a child is born, the father weaves the central eye, then one color is added for every year of the child's life until the child reaches the age of five. Original Tepehuan Crosses are extremely rare to come by. Many are made for the tourist market, but they do not carry the same traditional and spiritual significance.

== Nierika, Nieli'ka ==
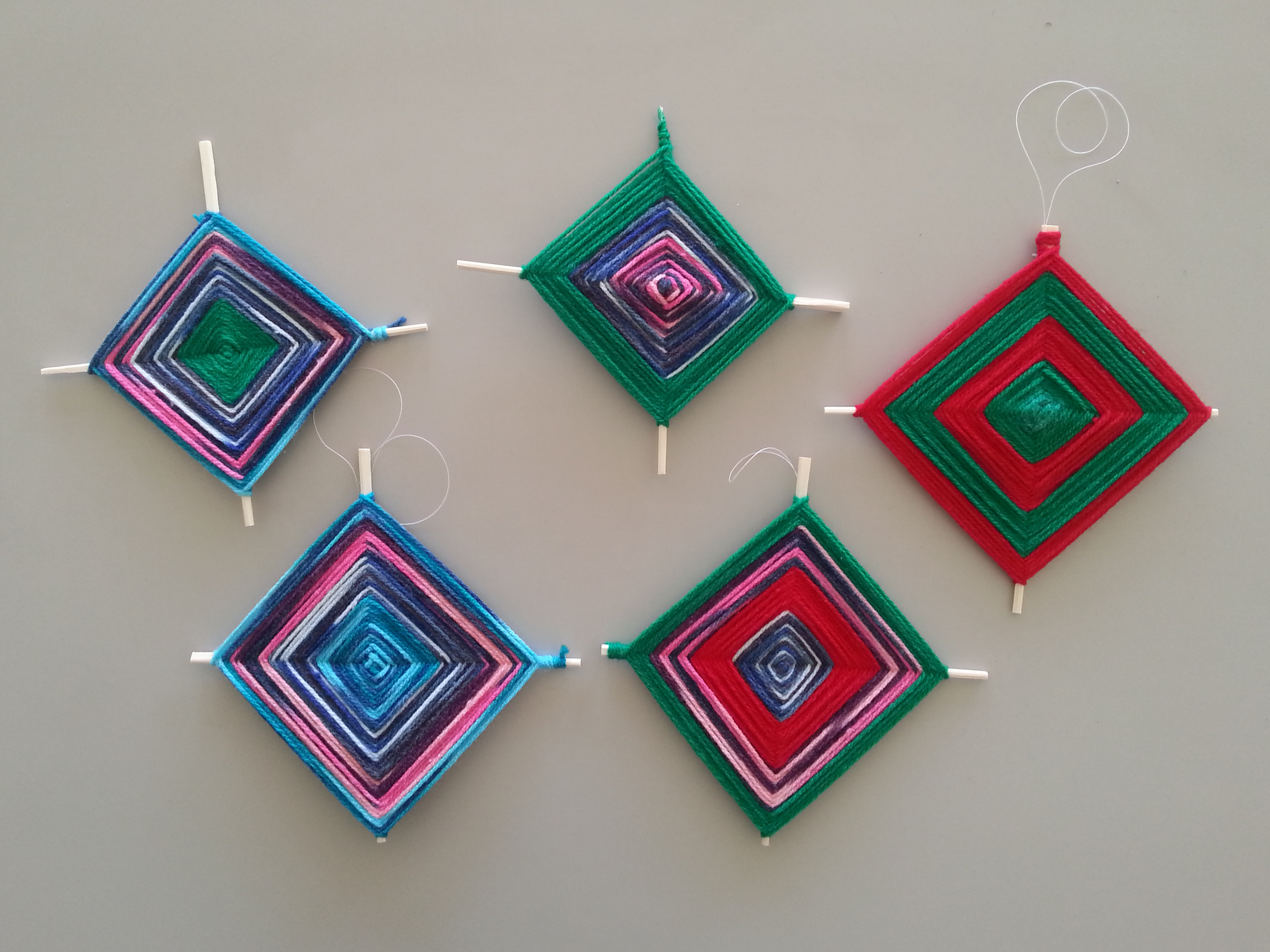
Ojo de dios made from chopsticks and yarn

In the traditional Huichol rancho, the nieli'ka or nierika is an important ritual artifact. Negrín states that one of the principal meanings of "nierika" is that of "a metaphysical vision, an aspect of a god or a collective ancestor," and is the same term the Tepehuán people use to refer to deities. Negrín quotes Lumholtz as stating that for the Huichol and Tepehuan "a nierika means a picture, an appearance, or a sacred representation." The term nierika is etymologically rooted in the verb nieriya, "to see". Nierika are found in Huichol and Tepehuans' most sacred places: house shrines (xiriki), springs, caves and temples. Some Natives of northwest Mexico and throughout the southwest U.S. have had visions during peyote ceremonies in which they received guidance from gods who appeared before them in many shapes, though the eyes of the God were so intense and overwhelming that many Natives could only see the eye of the God. To show others the vision they had, they made the God's eye - woven on sticks with handspun yarn, colored with various types of berries, flowers, and other materials to capture the essence of their vision.

Negrín states that: "The votive nierika is generally a round offering, symbolizing an ancestor and prayer offerings sanctified by the blood of a sacrificed animal." Nierika as a ritual object may be attached to votive arrows with bamboo and yarn, or wood-and-wax-embedded objects. Similarly, Lumholtz states that the nierika "evokes an ancestor, thanks it with blood offerings, and invokes its favors." The nierika may take different forms and fabrication may differ greatly: a small round or square tablet with a hole in the center covered on one or both sides with a mixture of beeswax and pine resin into which threads of yarn are pressed; when the image is not round, it may be considered a resting mat for the ancestors, or a prayer mat or itari.

Negrín states the elaborate interwoven nierika that Lumholtz called namma (which is close to the pronunciation of Namkha) from which originated the detailed and now prized yarn paintings of the commercial art world, are now rarely if ever seen. Namma were generally rectangular or square in shape, with yarn woven onto a grid of bamboo sticks. These God's Eyes are also called by the Spanish term ojo de dios. One understanding of the ojo de dios according to Harvey is of a: "wand" (the eye) through which the eye of god will see the supplicant. Harvey states that: "The cross of the ojo de dios is that of the legendary four directions: earth, fire, water, and air."

== See also ==
- Dreamcatcher
- Nazar (amulet)
- Namkha
- Witch ball
