= Builders' rites =

Ceremonies associated with construction

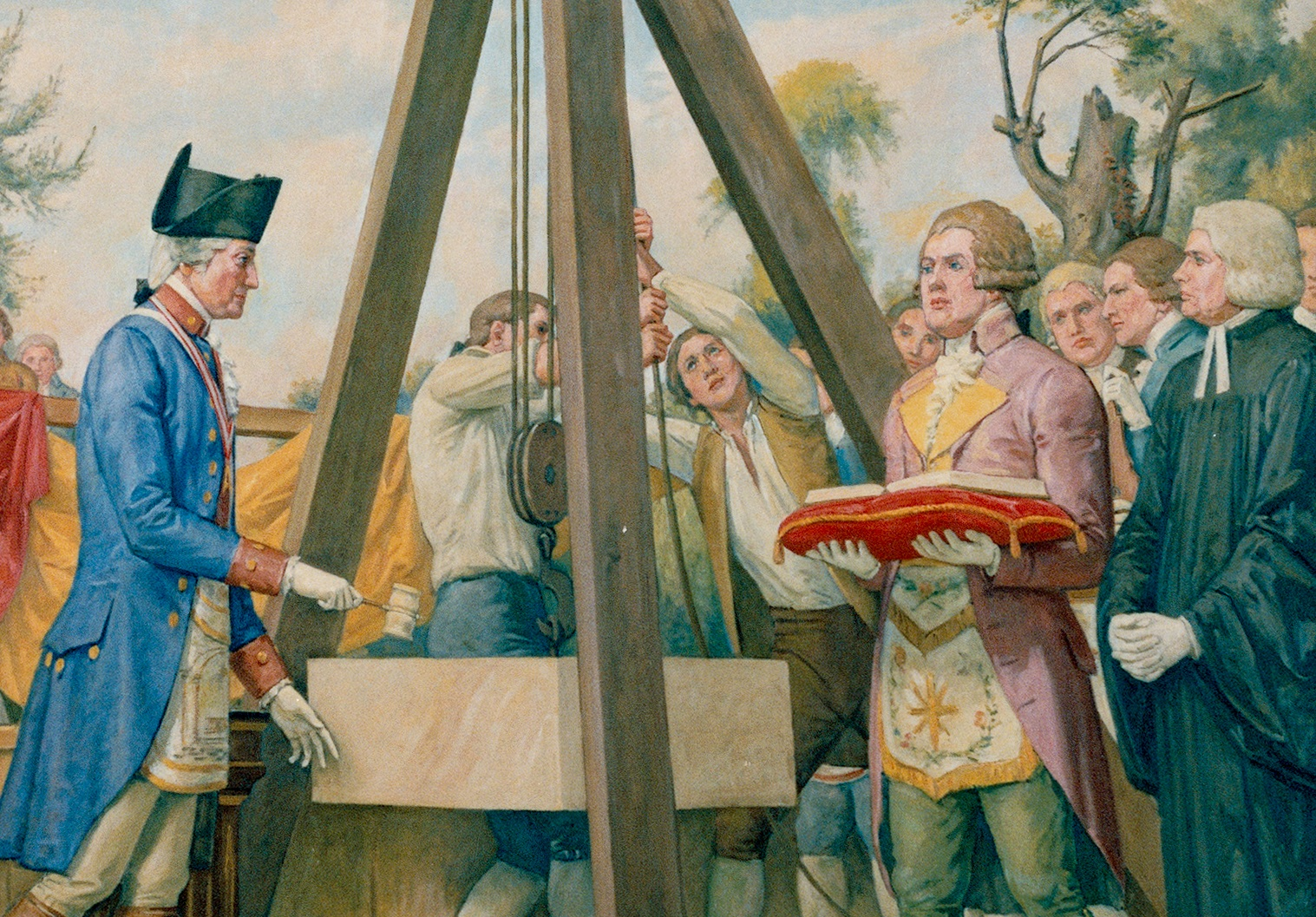
George Washington at the United States Capitol cornerstone laying depicted by Allyn Cox

Builders' rites are ceremonies attendant on the laying of foundation stones, including ecclesiastical, masonic or other traditions connected with foundations or other aspects of construction.

One such custom is that of placing a few coins, newspapers, etc. within a cavity beneath the stone. Should the stone later be removed, the relics may be found. Though this tradition is still practiced, such memorials are likely deposited in the hope that they will never be disturbed. Another such rite is topping out, when the last beam (or its equivalent) is placed atop a structure during its construction.

== History ==
Historians and folklorists in the 19th and early 20th centuries were fascinated by possible "foundation sacrifices". Jacob Grimm remarked, "It was often thought necessary to entomb live animals and even men in the foundation, on which the structure was to be raised, to secure immovable stability." Sabine Baring-Gould likewise claimed, "The old pagan laid the foundation of his house and fortress in blood." The 19th-century Folk-Lore Journal claimed that "under the walls of two round towers in Ireland (the only ones examined) human skeletons [were] discovered."

References to this practice can be found in Greek folk culture in a poem about "Arta's bridge". According to the poem, the wife of the chief builder was sacrificed to establish a good foundation for a bridge that was of grave importance to the secluded city of Arta. The actual bridge was constructed in 1602. A similar legend appears in the Romanian folk poem Meșterul Manole, about the building of the church in the earliest Wallachian capital city.

== See also ==
- Bay Bridge Troll
- Builder's signature
- Ceremonial ship launching
- Cornerstone
- Dried cat
- Foundation deposit
- Groundbreaking
- Hitobashira
- Horse skulls
- Masonic manuscripts
- Time capsule
- Topping out
- Votive offering
