= Concealed shoes =

Hidden midden in buildings

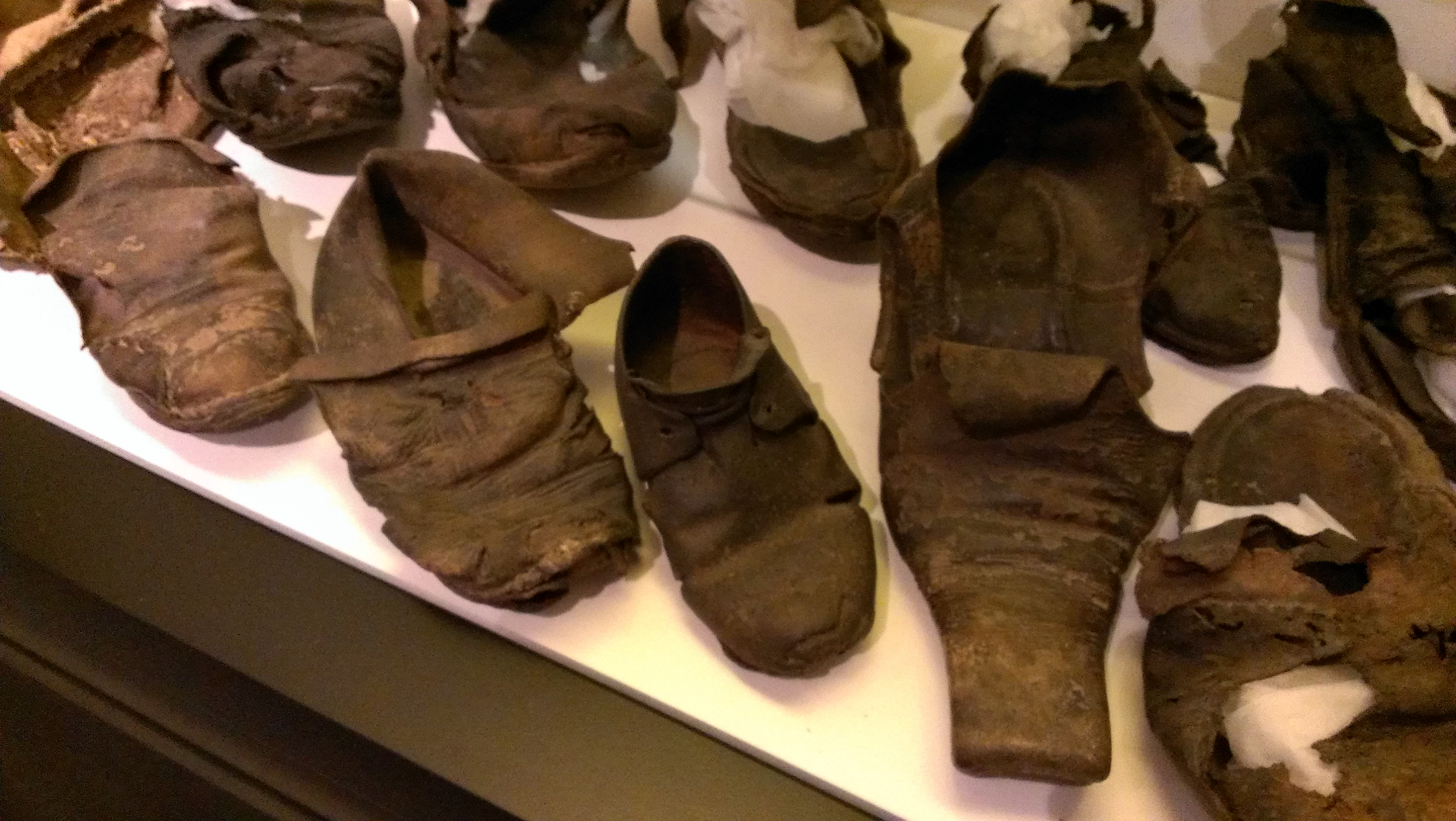
Concealed shoes from East Anglia

Concealed shoes hidden in the fabric of a building have been discovered in many European countries, as well as in other parts of the world, since at least the early modern period. Independent researcher Brian Hoggard has observed that the locations in which these shoes are typically found – in chimneys, under floors, above ceilings, around doors and windows, in the roof – suggest that some may have been concealed as magical charms to protect the occupants of the building against evil influences such as demons, ghosts and witches. Others may have been intended to bestow fertility on a female member of the household, or been an offering to a household deity.

Concealed shoes have been found in many types of buildings, including country houses, public houses, a Benedictine monastery and a Baptist church. The earliest yet reported was discovered behind the choir stalls in Winchester Cathedral, which were installed in 1308.

Northampton Museum maintains a Concealed Shoe Index, which as of 2012 contains 1,900 reports of discoveries, mostly from Britain and almost half from the 19th century. The overwhelming majority have been worn, and many have been repaired. Most finds are of single shoes, about half of them belonging to children. The custom appears to have died out some time during the 20th century.

== Background ==
Since at least the early modern period it was a common custom to hide objects such as written charms (known as apotropaic marks), dried cats, horse skulls, and witch bottles in the structure of a building, but concealed shoes are by far the most common items discovered. Archaeologist Brian Hoggard has observed that the locations in which these shoes are found suggest that at least some were concealed as magical charms to protect the occupants of the building against evil influences. Such hidden caches of objects are known by archaeologists as spiritual middens.

Northampton Museum maintains a Concealed Shoe Index, (Note: Northampton was once a major shoemaking centre.) which by 1998 contained more than 1,100 reports of concealed shoes, mostly from Britain but some from as far away as Canada. By 2012 it had increased to 1,900 entries, of which almost half date from the 19th century.

The custom of concealing shoes in the fabric of a building appears to have more or less died out some time during the 20th century, although not entirely. In 1964, the shoe manufacturer Norvic incorporated a pair of their women's high-leg boots in the foundations of their new factory built. In 1991, at Knebworth House, an estate worker's shoe replaced an "old court shoe" that had been discovered behind some panelling. Only 50 post-1900 instances of concealed shoes have been recorded.

== Location of finds ==
Concealed shoes have been discovered in several European countries, and in North America and Australia. Although deposits have been found throughout the United States. they are concentrated in New England and the northeastern United States, the areas first colonised by immigrants from the East Anglia region of England. (Note: There were relatively few witch trials and executions in England compared to other European countries, but East Anglia did experience one of the most intense witch hunts in the country, as for a time did New England.)

An analysis of the Concealed Shoe Index maintained by Northampton Museum, conducted by June Swann and published in 1996, reveals that the most common place of concealment is the chimney, fireplace or hearth (26.2 per cent), followed by under the floor or above the ceiling (22.9 per cent), and almost as many concealed in the roof. Shoes have also been found around doors and windows, under the stairs, and among the foundations.

Concealed shoes have been discovered in many types of building: country cottages, town houses, manor houses, hospitals, workhouses, factories, public houses, and two Oxford colleges, St John's and Queen's. They have even been found in ecclesiastical buildings, including a Benedictine monastery in Germany and a Baptist church in Cheshire, England.

The earliest concealed shoe yet reported was discovered behind the choirstalls in Winchester Cathedral, which were installed in 1308.

== Characteristics ==
Most of the concealed shoes found to date are made of leather, but wooden clogs and rubber galoshes have also been reported, among others. The overwhelming majority (almost 98 per cent) have been worn, and many show signs of repair. All ages are represented in the shoe sizes, from babies to adults. There is little difference in the ratio of adult male to female shoes, at 21.5 per cent and 26.5 per cent respectively. Most finds are of single shoes, but some pairs have also been discovered. About half of the shoes so far discovered belonged to children.

Apart from their significance to folklore, concealed shoes give an important insight into what ordinary people have historically worn on their feet.

== Explanations ==
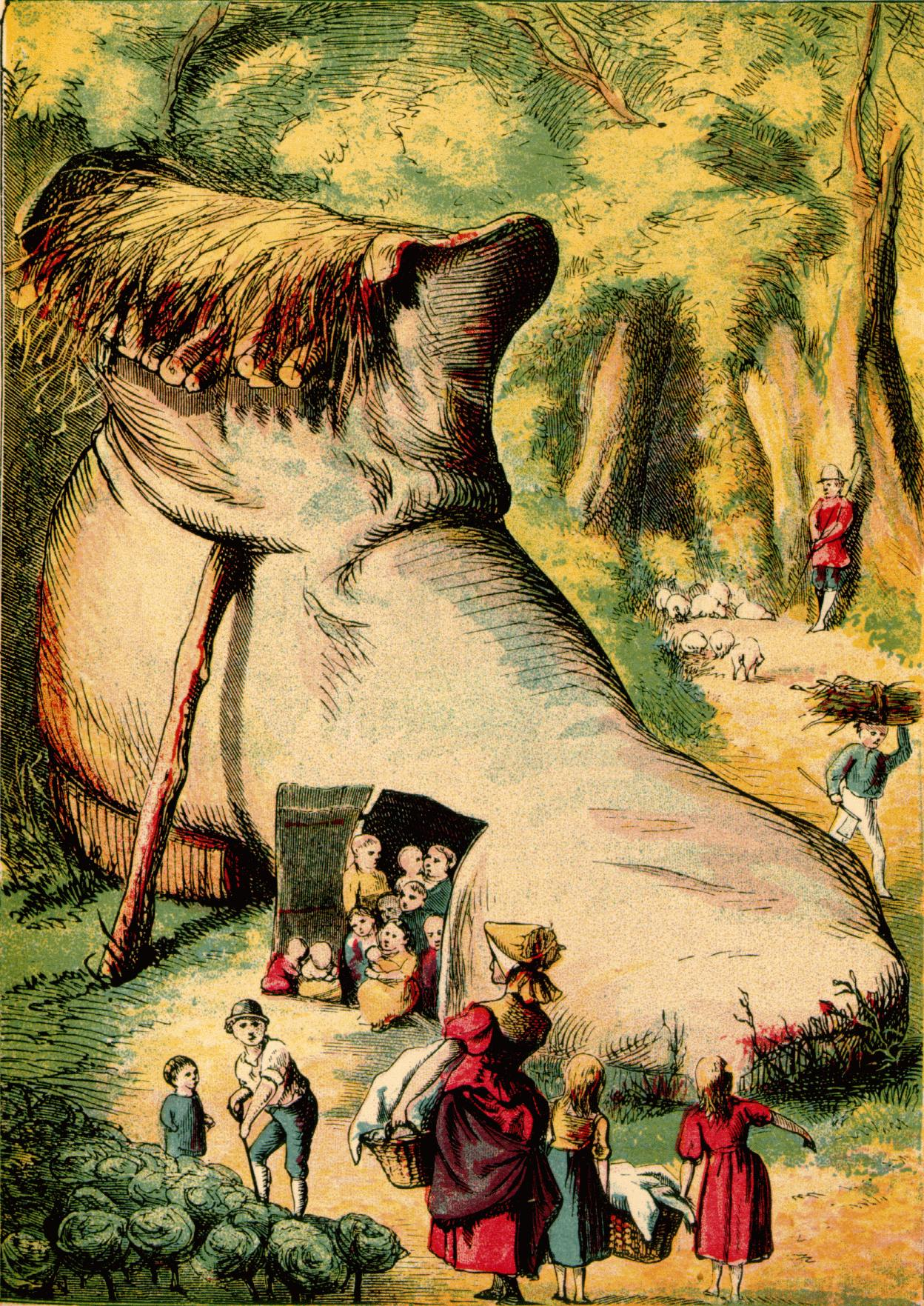
The nursery rhyme "There was an Old Woman Who Lived in a Shoe" is an example of a connection between shoes being incorporated into buildings, and fertility.

Several theories have been advanced to account for the incorporation of shoes into the fabric of a building, one of which is that they served as some kind of fertility charm. There is a long-standing connection between shoes and fertility, perhaps exemplified by the nursery rhyme, "There was an Old Woman Who Lived in a Shoe", and the custom of casting a shoe after a bride as she leaves for her honeymoon or attaching shoes to the departing couple's car. Archaeologist Ralph Merrifield has observed that in the English county of Lancashire women who wished to conceive might try on the shoes of a woman who had just given birth, a custom known as "smickling."

Another theory, and the one favoured by most scholars, argues that shoes were concealed to protect against evil influences such as demons, ghosts, witches, and familiars. Witches were believed to be attracted by the human scent of a shoe, and after entering one found themselves trapped, as they are unable to reverse. Merrifield has suggested that an unofficial 14th-century English saint, John Schorne, may have been the source of the belief that shoes had the power to protect against evil. Schorne was said to have succeeded in trapping the Devil in a boot, a legend that may have its origin in a more ancient folk belief, which the Church was attempting to convert into an "approved Christian rite".

Archaeologist and architectural historian M. Chris Manning has proposed that the immurement of shoes, garments, and other objects may be related to the belief in a household deity or helpful spirit found throughout northern Europe from Ireland to western Russia. According to Manning, Schorne's use of a shoe to capture or repel a troublesome spirit may have called upon an existing belief in the power of shoes and other garments to attract, repel, or "lay" such spirits.

The brownie and hob, domestic fairies found in England and Scotland, could be driven off by a gift of clothing. In Russia, it was said that the domovoi, a helpful domestic spirit, could be attracted to a home with an old boot or bast shoe placed under the stove or hung in the yard. The belief in household spirits is closely tied to the concept of the supernatural familiar, which is linked to the belief in demons and other harmful spirits.

Thirteen of the shoes in Swann's analysis, only a small fraction of the thousands of concealed shoes reported worldwide, were buried in the foundations of a building. She has alluded to a possible connection with the Carthaginian practice of putting human babies in the foundations of their buildings, and suggested that the shoes may have acted as a substitute for the person.

Shoes continued to be "good luck" symbols throughout the early nineteenth century. Several greeting cards from the time show old boots next to horse shoes with good luck messages.

== See also ==
- Apotropaic magic
- Apotropaic markings
- Amulet
- Builders' rites
- Dried cat
- Horse skulls
- Kitchen witch
- Mezuzah
- Talisman
- Witch ball
- Witch bottle
- Yard globe
