= Witch bottle =

Magical item

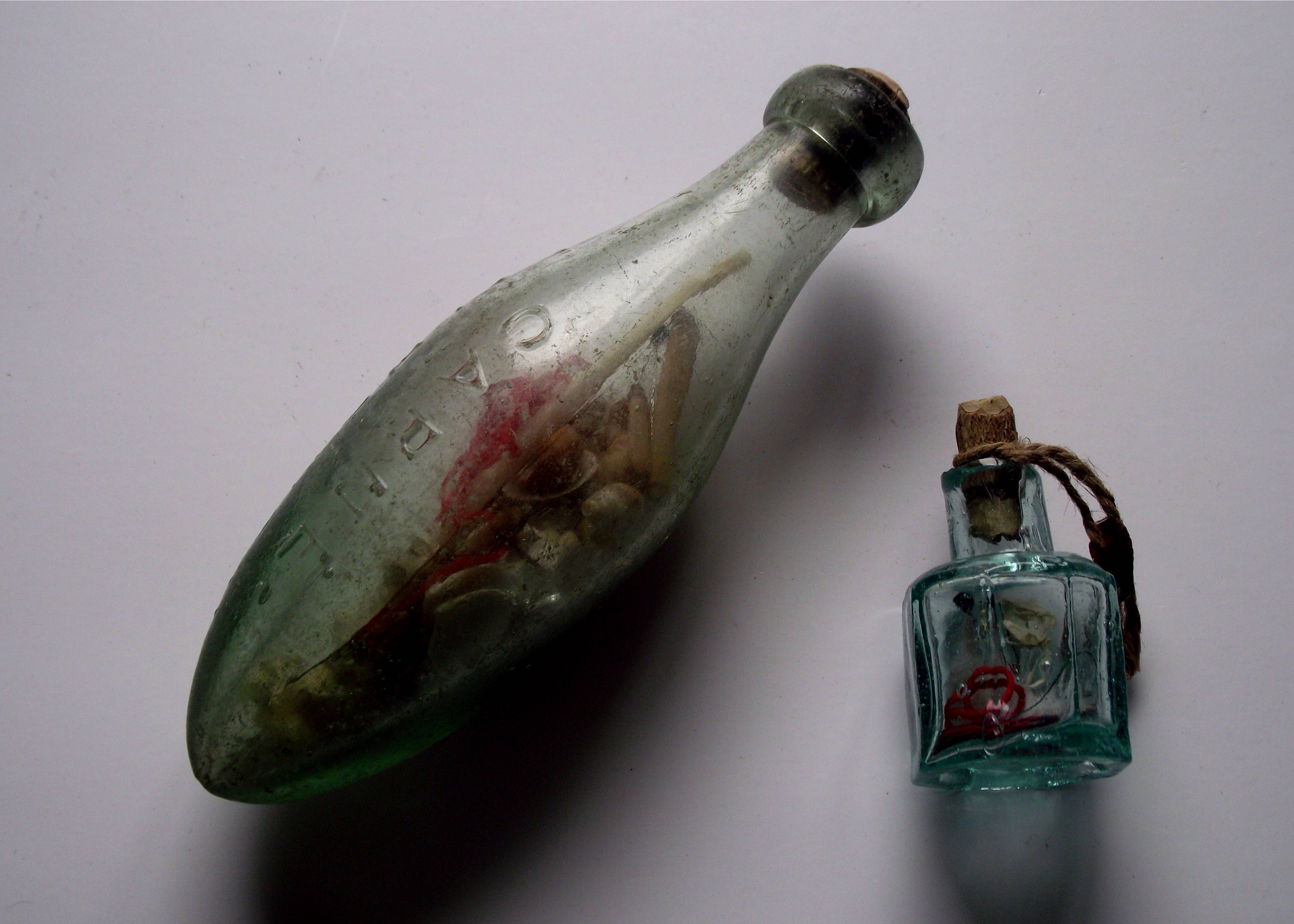
Witch bottles

A witch bottle is a apotropaic magical item used as protection against witchcraft. They are described in historical sources from England and the United States. The earliest surviving mention is from seventeenth-century England.

== Origins and purpose ==
One of the earliest descriptions of a witch bottle in Suffolk, England, appears in 1681 in Joseph Glanvill’s Saducismus Triumphatus, or Evidence concerning Witches and Apparitions:

For an old Man that Travelled up and down the Country, and had some acquaintance at that house, calling in and asking the Man of the house how he did and his Wife; He told him that himself was well, but his Wife had been a long time in a languishing condition, and that she was haunted with a thing in the shape of a Bird that would flurr [sic] near to her face, and that she could not enjoy her natural rest well. The Old Man bid him and his Wife be of good courage. It was but a dead Spright, he said, and he would put him in a course to rid his Wife of this languishment and trouble, He therefore advised him to take a Bottle, and put his Wives Urine into it, together with Pins and Needles and Nails, and Cork them up and set the Bottle to the Fire well corkt, which when it had felt a while the heat of the Fire began to move and joggle a little, but he for sureness took the Fire shovel, and held it hard upon the Cork, And as he thought, he felt something one while on this side, another while on that, shove the Fire shovel off, which he still quickly put on Again, but at last at one shoving the Cork bounced out, and the Urine, Pins, Nails and Needles all flew up, and gave a report like a Pistol, and his Wife continued in the same trouble and languishment still.

Not long after, the Old Man came to the house again, and inquired of the Man of the house how his Wife did. Who answered, as ill as ever, if not worse. He askt him if he had followed his direction. Yes, says he, and told him the event as is above said. Ha, quoth he, it seems it was too nimble for you. But now I will put you in a way that will make the business sure. Take your Wive’s Urine as before, and Cork, it in a Bottle with Nails, Pins and Needles, and bury it in the Earth; and that will do the feat. The Man did accordingly. And his Wife began to mend sensibly and in a competent time was finely well recovered; But there came a Woman from a Town some miles off to their house, with a lamentable Out-cry, that they had killed her Husband. They askt her what she meant and thought her distracted, telling her they knew neither her nor her Husband. Yes, saith she, you have killed my Husband, he told me so on his Death-bed. But at last they understood by her, that her Husband was a Wizard, and had bewitched this Mans Wife and that this Counter-practice prescribed by the Old Man, which saved the Mans Wife from languishment, was the death of that Wizard that had bewitched her.

Since at least the early modern period it has been a common custom to hide objects such as written charms, dried cats, horse skulls, concealed shoes, and witch bottles in the structure of a building. Folk magic contends that witch bottles protect against evil spirits and magical attacks, and counteract spells cast by witches; they are countermagical devices, the purpose of which is to draw in and trap harmful intentions directed at their owners.

== Description ==
Some of the earliest documented witch bottles consist of salt glazed stoneware jugs known as Bartmann jugs, Bellarmines, or "Greybeards". Bellarmines were named after a particularly fearsome Catholic Inquisitor, Robert Bellarmine, who persecuted Protestants and was instrumental in the burning of Giordano Bruno. Greybeards and Bellarmines were made of brown or gray stoneware glazed with salt and embossed with a bearded face.

Later witch bottles were made from glass bottles, small glass vials, and a variety of other containers.

== Preparation ==
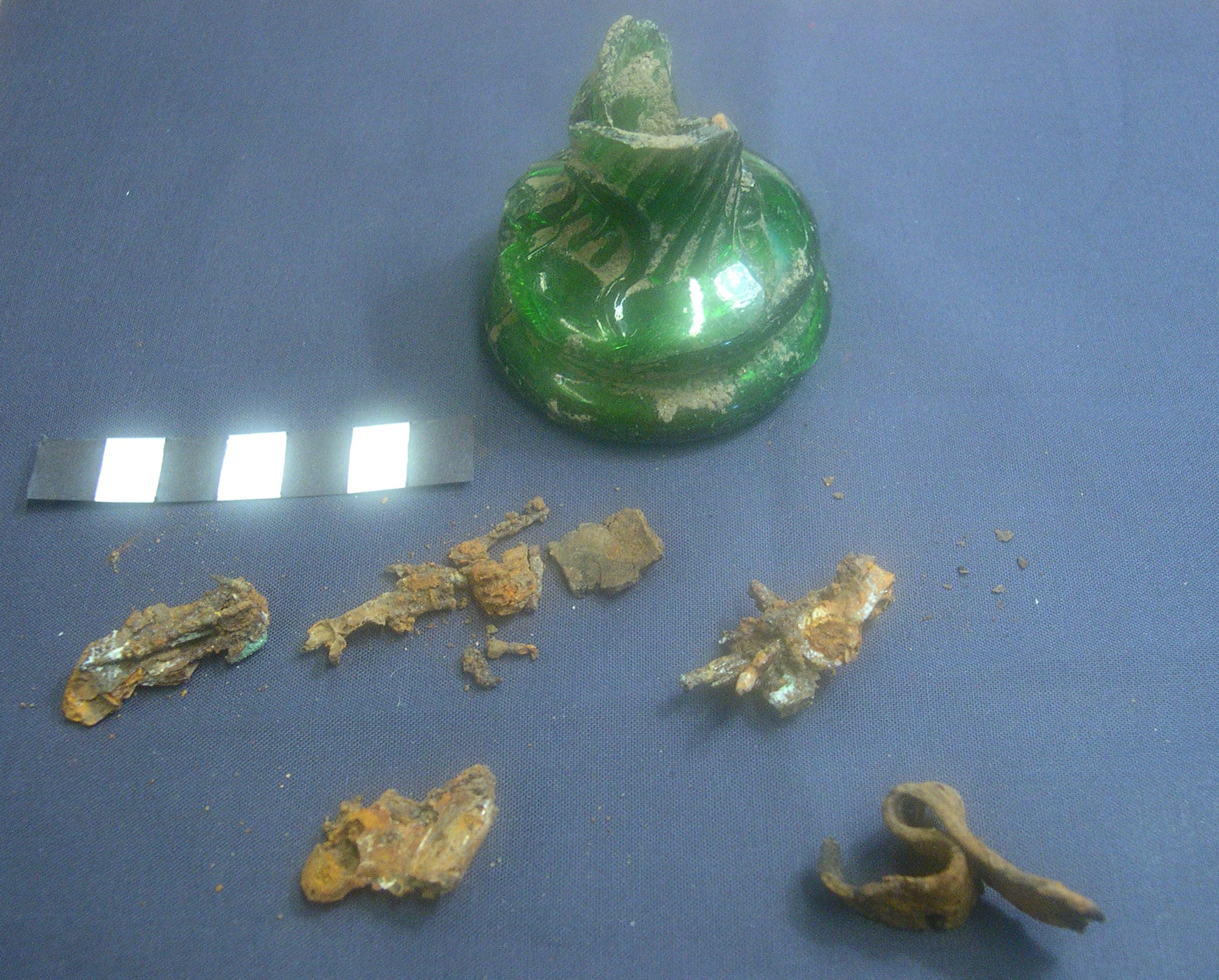
Early nineteenth-century witch bottle from Lincolnshire, England, and its contents

A white witch or folk healer would prepare the witch's bottle. Historically, the witch's bottle contained the victim's (the person who believed they had a spell put on them, for example) urine, hair or nail clippings, or red thread from sprite traps. Later witch bottles were filled with rosemary, needles and pins, and red wine. Historically and currently, the bottle is then buried at the farthest corner of the property, or beneath the house hearth, or placed in an inconspicuous spot in the house. It is believed that after being buried, the bottle captures evil that is impaled on the pins and needles, drowned by the wine, and sent away by the rosemary.

Sometimes sea water or earth are used instead. Other types of witch bottles may contain sand, stones, knotted threads, feathers, shells, herbs, flowers, salt, vinegar, oil, coins, or ashes. A similar magical device is the "lemon and pins" charm.

Another variation is within the disposal of the bottle. Some witch bottles were thrown into a fire and when they exploded, the spell was broken or the witch supposedly killed.

The witch bottle was believed to be active as long as the bottle remained hidden and unbroken. People did go through a lot of trouble in hiding their witch bottles – those buried underneath fireplaces have been found only after the rest of the building had been torn down or otherwise disappeared. The origins of this tradition have been dated at least to the sixteenth century. In ancient times the bottles were made of stone and originally contained rusty nails, urine, thorns, hair, menstrual blood, and pieces of glass, wood, and bone.

== In England ==
This form of "bottled spell" dates back hundreds of years, and were prevalent in Elizabethan England – especially East Anglia, where superstitions and belief in witches were strong. The bottles were most often found buried under the fireplace, under the floor, and plastered inside walls. In 2016 a glass bottle found buried in the threshold of a man's house was featured in an episode of Antiques Roadshow filmed in Trelissick, Cornwall; glass specialist Andy McConnell tasted a small amount of the contents theorising it was possibly port or wine though he did note the rusty flavour and the presence of nails, a later episode in 2019 then revealed the contents had been analysed by Loughborough University that identified it actually contained "urine, a tiny bit of alcohol, and one human hair" alongside some brass pins dating from the late 1840s and an ostracod. It was theorised to be a witch bottle.

== In Belgium ==
During the renovation of the De Zwarte Ruiter pub in Turnhout, Belgium, in 2020 a jug from the sixteenth century was discovered. It was used to ward off witchcraft. It is the first time such a "witch bottle" has been found in Europe outside England.

== In the United States ==
To date, fewer than a dozen possible witch bottles have been identified in the United States. Archaeologist Marshall Becker was the first to identify an American witch bottle in an archaeological context. Known as the Essington witch bottle, the artifact was recovered during excavations on Great Tinicum Island in Delaware County, Pennsylvania. A mid-nineteenth to early twentieth-century slave or tenant site in Dorchester County, Maryland, yielded a buried witch bottle whose cork stopper was bristling with straight pins. In 2016, a bottle filled with nails was excavated from the hearth of a Civil War site in Virginia and appears to be a witch bottle.

== See also ==
- Amulet
- Apotropaic magic
- Dreamcatcher
- Frog coffin
- Gehōbako
- God-in-a-bottle, Catholic devotional object
- Hoko
- Kitchen witch
- Mezuzah
- Poppet
- Shikigami
- Talisman
- Voodoo doll
- Witch ball
- Yard globe
