= Witch ball =

Glass sphere said to ward off evil

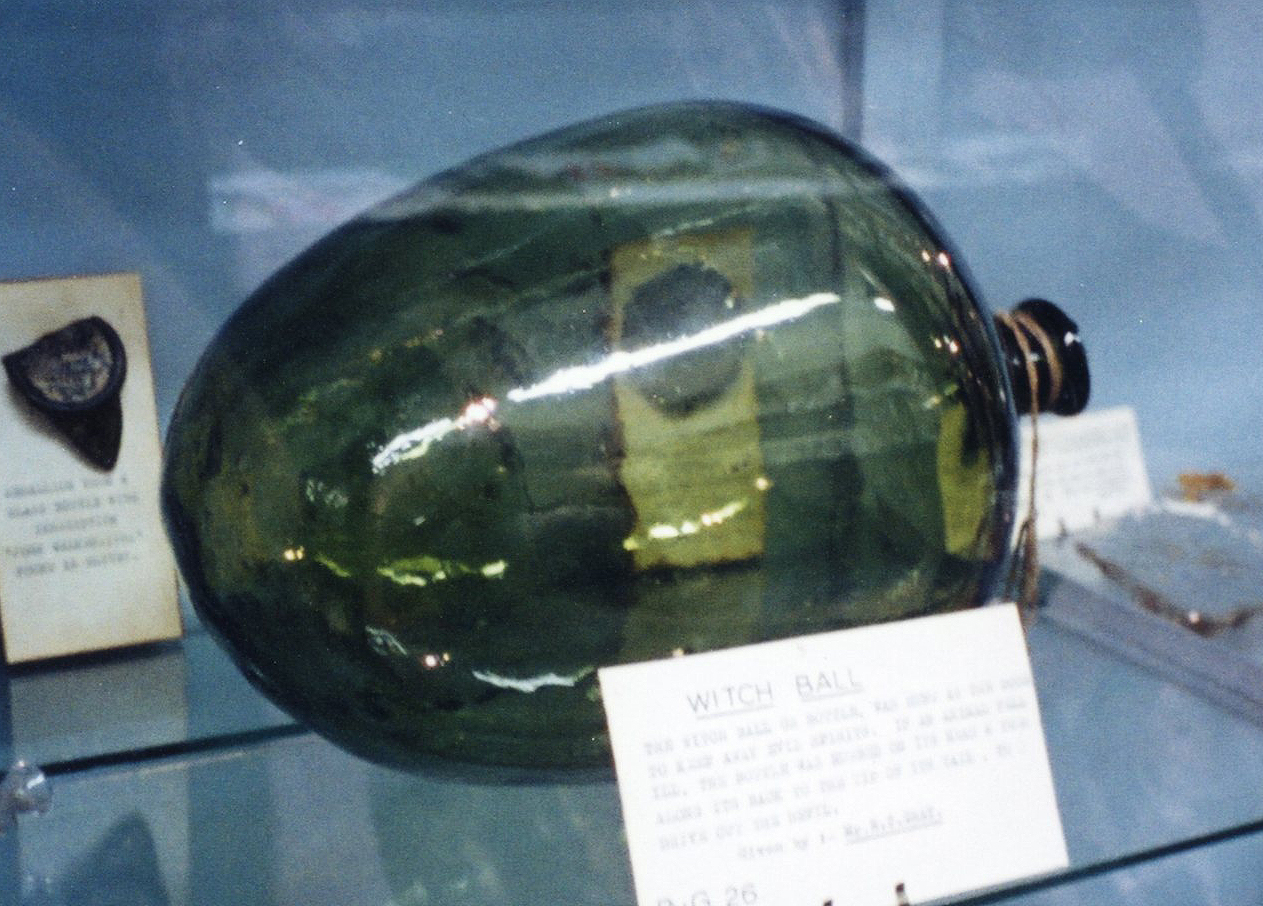
A witch ball on display at Whitby Museum in Yorkshire

A witch ball is a hollow sphere of glass. Witch balls were hung in cottage windows in 17th- and 18th-century England to ward off evil spirits, witches, evil spells, and ill fortune.

Witch balls were used to ward off evil spirits in the English counties of East Sussex and West Sussex. The tradition was also taken to overseas British colonies, such as New England, and remains popular in coastal regions. Examples of the witch ball in use can be seen in the windows of houses from small rural villages to coastal towns and cities. Examples can also be seen in shop windows as well, often not for sale as they are prized.

== Origin ==
The witch ball originated among cultures where harmful magic and those who practiced it were feared. They are one of many folk practices involving objects for protecting the household. The word witch ball may be a corruption of watch ball because it was used to ward off, or guard against, evil spirits. They may be hung in an eastern window, placed on top of a vase or suspended by a cord (as from the mantelpiece or rafters). They may also be placed on sticks in windows or hung in rooms where inhabitants wanted to ward off evil.

Superstitious European sailors valued the talismanic powers of witch balls in protecting their homes. Witch balls appeared in America in the 19th century and larger, more opaque variations are often found in gardens under the name 'gazing ball'. This name derives from their being used for divination and scrying where a person gazes into them dreamily to try to see future events or to see the answers to questions. However, gazing balls contain no strands within their interior.

== Purpose ==
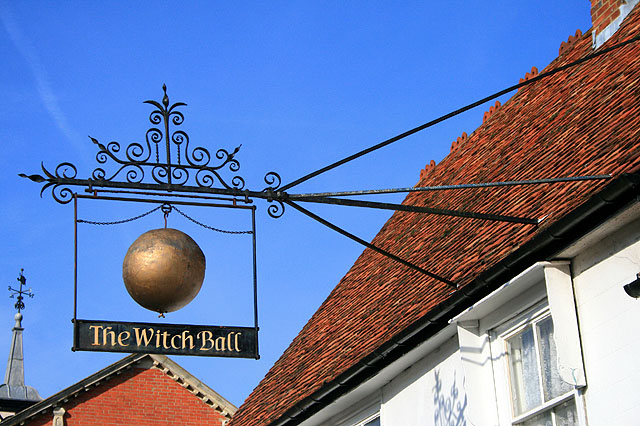
Pub sign of The Witch Ball, a former public house in Thame, Oxfordshire

There are several variations relating to the purpose of witch balls. According to folk tales, witch balls would entice evil spirits with their bright colours; the strands inside the ball would then capture the spirit and prevent it from escaping. Another tradition holds that witch balls or spherical mirrors prevented a witch from being in a room, because witches supposedly did not have a reflection or could not bear seeing their own reflection. Yet another variation contends that witch balls were used to avert the evil eye, by attracting the gaze of the eye and preventing harm to the house and its inhabitants.

In the 17th century, witch balls and witch bottles were filled with holy water or salt. Balls containing salt were hung up in the chimney to keep the salt dry. Salt was a precious commodity, and breaking the ball or bottle was considered bad luck.

== Types ==
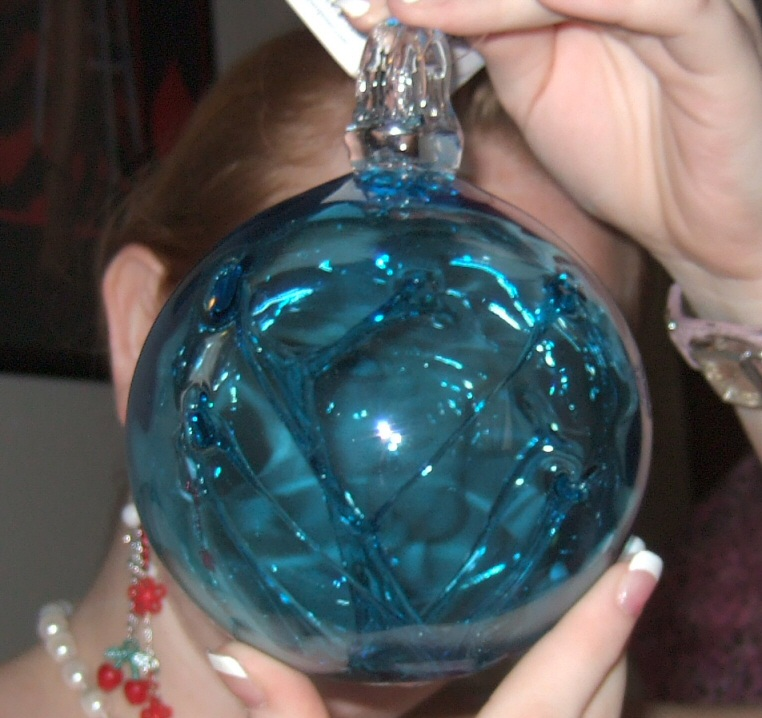
A blue witch ball

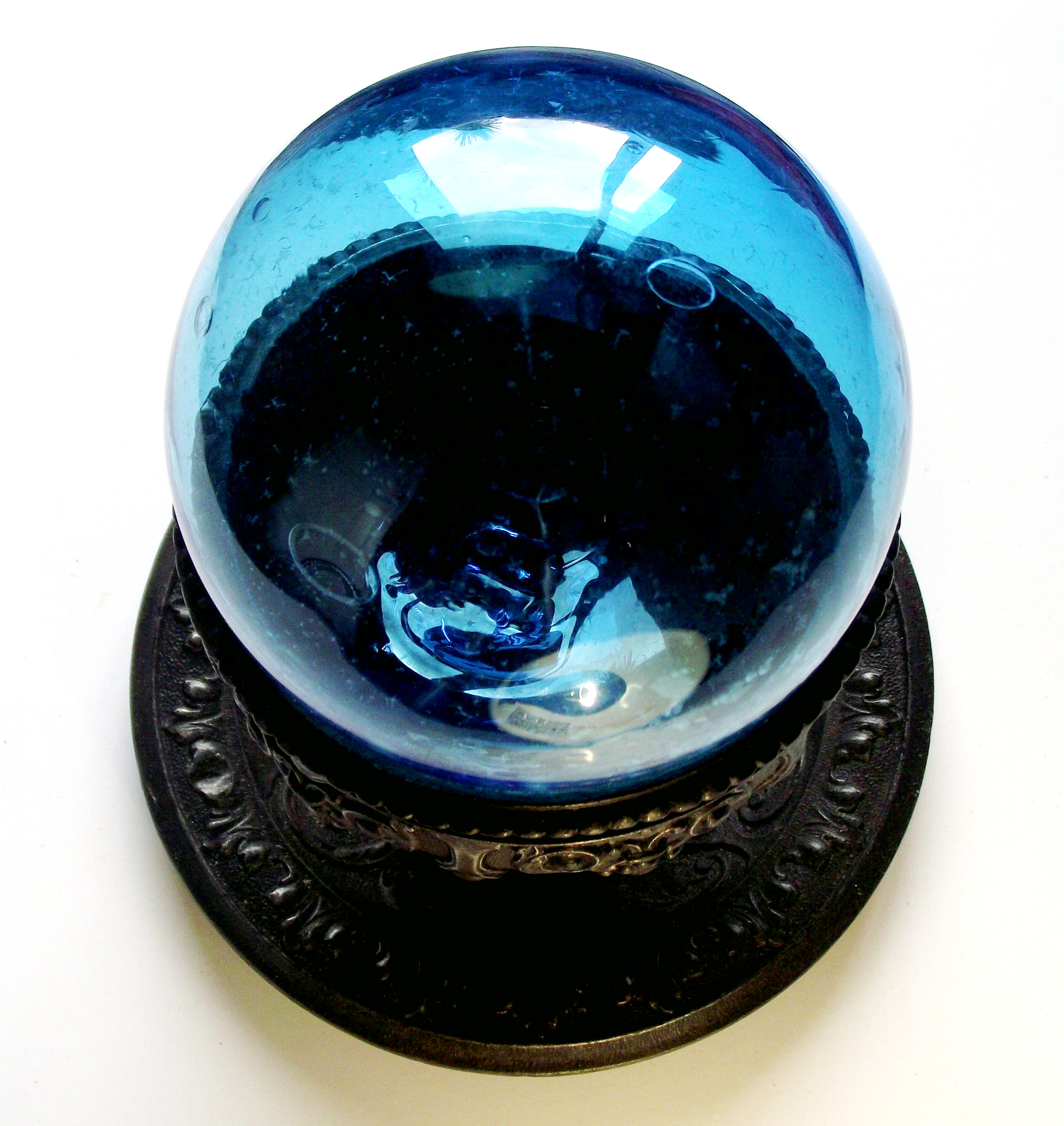
A witch ball with a base or stand

Witch balls sometimes measure as large as seven inches (18 cm) in diameter. The witch ball is traditionally, but not always, green or blue in colour and made from glass (others, however, are made of wood, grass, or twigs instead of glass). Some are decorated in swirls and brilliant stripes of various colours. Witch balls normally have a hole in the top where a peg can be inserted; string is then attached to the peg so the ball can be hung in a chimney or over a window. Early witch balls often had a short neck sealed by a stopper. The gazing balls found in today's gardens are derived from the silvered witch balls that acted as convex mirrors, warding off evil by reflecting it away.

In the Ozark Mountains, another kind of witch ball is made from black hair that is rolled with beeswax into a hard round pellet about the size of a marble and is used in curses. In Ozark folklore, a witch that wants to kill someone will take this hair ball and throw it at the intended victim; it is said that when someone in the Ozarks is killed by a witch's curse, this witch ball is found near the body.

In the Appalachian Mountains of Kentucky, tradition holds that witch balls were made by rolling cow or horse hair into a small ball. A witch would draw a picture of the intended victim, then throw the ball at the part of the victim they wished to injure.

== Christmas ornament ==
In A Time of Gifts, Patrick Leigh-Fermor mentions the daughters of the owner of a gasthof (guest house) in Bingen am Rhein, Germany, hanging witch balls on the Christmas tree in 1933, which suggests a link to modern baubles.

== See also ==
- Amulet
- Apotropaic magic
- Apotropaic mark
- Christmas ornament
- Concealed shoes
- Dreamcatcher
- Gehōbako
- Glass float
- Hoko (doll)
- Kitchen witch
- Mezuzah
- Namkha
- Nazar (amulet)
- Talisman
- Witch bottle
- Yard globe
