= Builder's signature =

Tradesperson's signature on constructed project

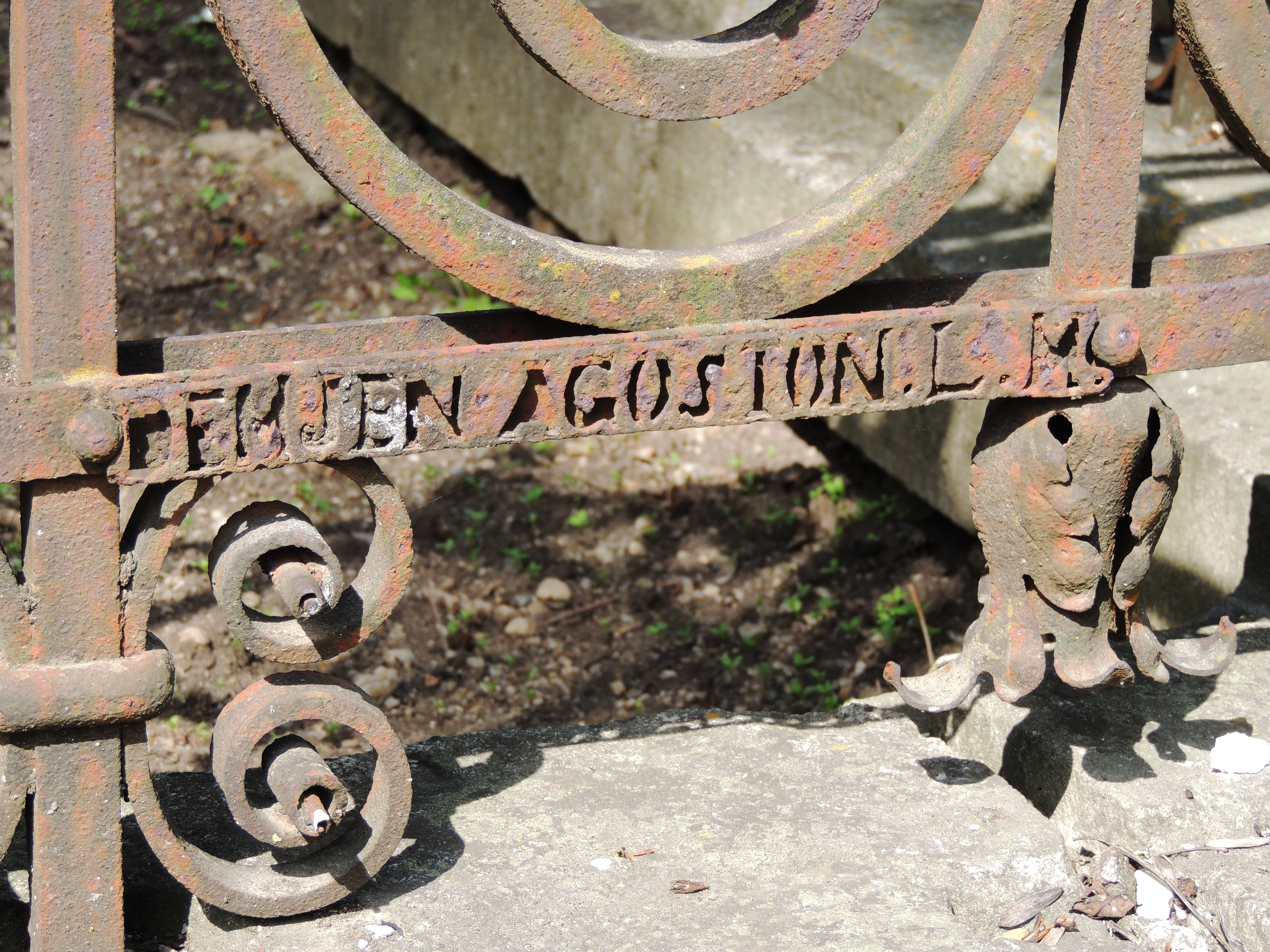
A tradesman's signature is seen on a fence at Házsongárd Cemetery in Cluj, Romania

A builder's signature, sometimes known as a craftsman's signature, tradesman's signature, or workman's signature, is a type of signature associated with several skilled trades in which a tradesperson inscribes their name on a structure during or after completion of a project. In some instances, the signature may be hidden from public view, such as a signature inscribed on wooden framing which is subsequently covered with drywall; in other instances the signature may be prominently displayed such as in concrete.

== Historic examples ==
Several notable architects and carpenters throughout history are known to have employed builder's signatures on the structures they built. Frank Lloyd Wright was known to place a red square tile on buildings he designed; on six occasions, Wright signed his name inside these square tiles. Thomas de Monchaux has written that "in 1950, Wright commissioned ceramicist Jeanette Pauson Haber, to make some 25 red tiles inscribed with his initials, that were, in an account preserved in the Wright archives, ‘intended to be placed in buildings designed by Frank Lloyd Wright where the consecution and final completion of the opus adhered to his specifications and thus received his personal approval.'” The sixteenth century painter Raphael Urbinas was also an architect and he was known to place his signature on structures he designed; for example, in 2016 John D. Holgate described a "pagan temple where Raphael Urbinas has left his signature."

== By trade ==
=== Carpentry ===
In 2004, Karen Wildung Reinhart described the discovery of a builder's signature at Old Faithful Inn in Yellowstone National Park, stating that "during the fall of 2000, a workman’s signature was found on one of the inn’s uppermost window frames. It was written in thick pencil—perhaps a carpenter’s pencil—with the name “Albert Rock or Roch[e]” and the date May 7, 1904."

In 2018, Gaye Lebaron reported the presence of "a signature on a beam in the north tower of the Petaluma's old silk mill dated January 22, 1927." The Hanson Meeting hall at the New England Wireless and Steam Museum in East Greenwich, Rhode Island features a signature by W.B. Arnold dated Sept 14th, 1901.

=== Concrete and cement ===
In 1998, Calvin Kendall described a builder's signature located on the portico of the Archbasilica of Saint John Lateran, explaining that "when the Romanesque façade was added in 1170 to the east front of the basilica of Saint John Lateran in Rome, the architect Niccolo di Angelo signed his name on the right-hand pier of the portico beneath the verse inscription of the architrave." In 2007, Friedrich Schwerdtfeger described the presence of craftsmen's signatures on structures in Zaria, Nigeria, where "in some cases, the craftsman's signature is scratched into cement plaster."

=== Masonry ===
Builder's signatures also appear in brickwork and masonry. In 2019, Scott P. Stephen explained that in 1753, a craftsman named Henry Robinson signed his name on the outer brick wall of the Prince of Wales Fort, "just beside the front gate."

=== Roofing ===
In 2003, builder's signatures were discovered at the New York State Capitol building in Albany during a roof restoration project to replace the finials and roofing of the building. Restoration crews discovered names and dates inside the finials and the capitol responded by hiring researchers to identify the workmen. The names signed are W. Brown, R. Bewsher, and M. Grogan, dated August 19, 1891, and researchers ultimately determined that these signatures belonged to William Brown, Richard Bewsher, and Michael Grogan, all of whom were roofers born in the mid-nineteenth century.

== Authorship ==
In some instances, a builder's signature may be inscribed not by the person involved with the physical construction of the project, but by someone who has been significantly involved in the planning or financial backing of the project. For example, in 2019, it was reported that American president Donald J. Trump signed his name in sharpie on the Mexico–United States border wall. Trump himself did not physically construct the wall; however, he was the lead spokesperson and organizer of the project.

== In popular culture ==
Various works of fiction have discussed builders' signatures in their descriptions of setting such as the novels The Samarkand Hijack by David Monnery, Wine, Tarts, & Sex by Susan Johnson, and Capsize by David Kushner. The Samarkand Hijack describes an intricately carved elm door bearing an Uzbek signature dated 1405 AD, and in Kushner's detective novel Capsize, the builder's signature figures into a central part of the plot whereby it is used as evidence in the solving of the mystery.

== See also ==
- Builders' rites
- Glyph
- Mason's mark
- Tektōn
- Time capsule
