= Foundation deposit =

Type of archaeological artifact

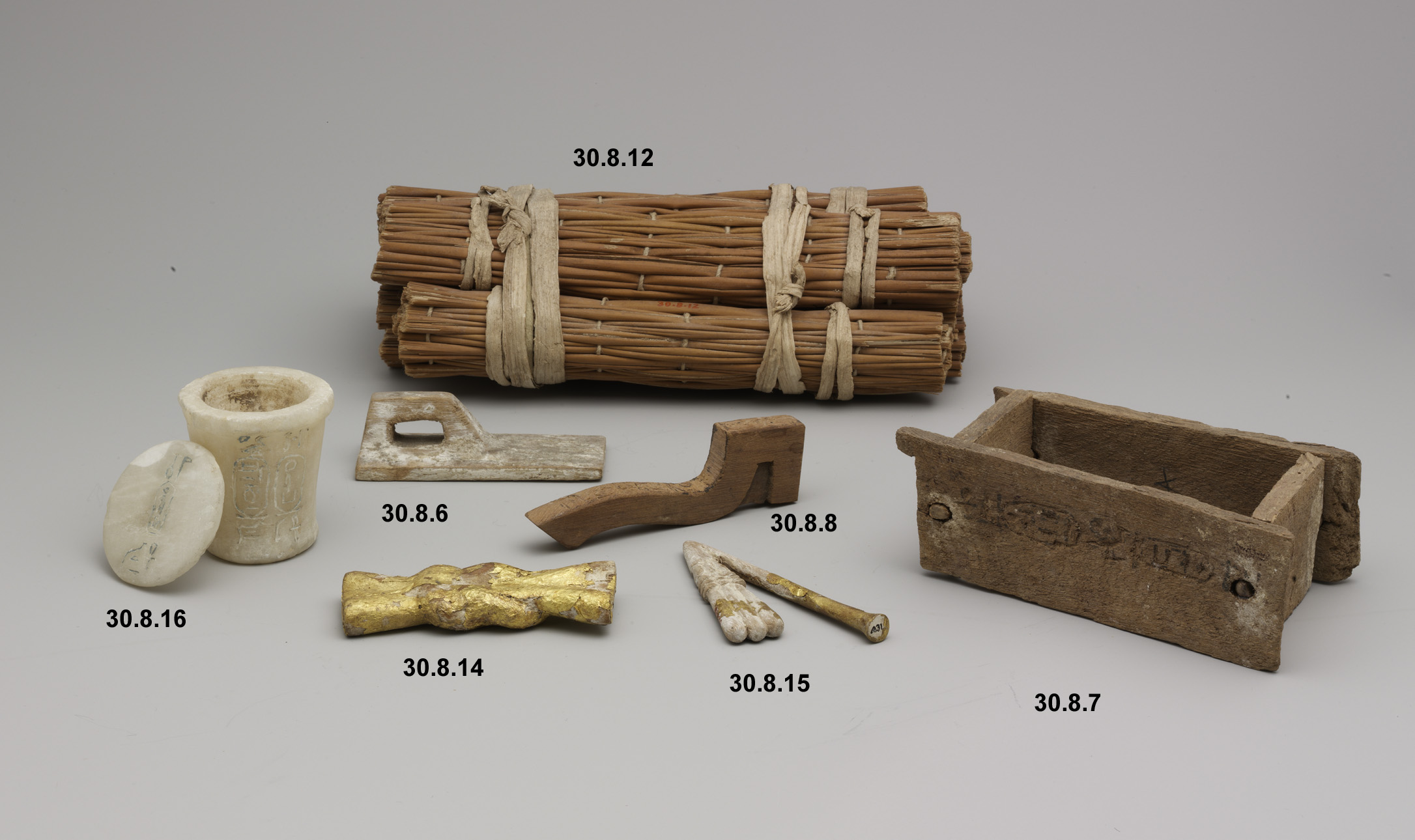
Foundation deposits for Hatshepsut's tomb

Foundation deposits are the archaeological remains of the ritual burial of materials under the foundations of buildings.

== Ancient Egypt ==
In the case of Ancient Egypt, foundation deposits took the form of ritual mudbrick lined pits or holes dug at specific points under temples or tombs, which were filled with ceremonial objects, usually amulets, scarabs, food, or ritual miniature tools, and were supposed to prevent the building from falling into ruin.

== Examples ==
- The Cyrus Cylinder, found in Babylon following Cyrus the Great's conquest
- The Artemision deposit at the Temple of Artemis in Ephesus, in modern-day Turkey
- The foundation deposit at the Temple of Hatshepsut in Luxor, Egypt
- The Apadana Hoard of coins found under Apadana Palace at Persepolis
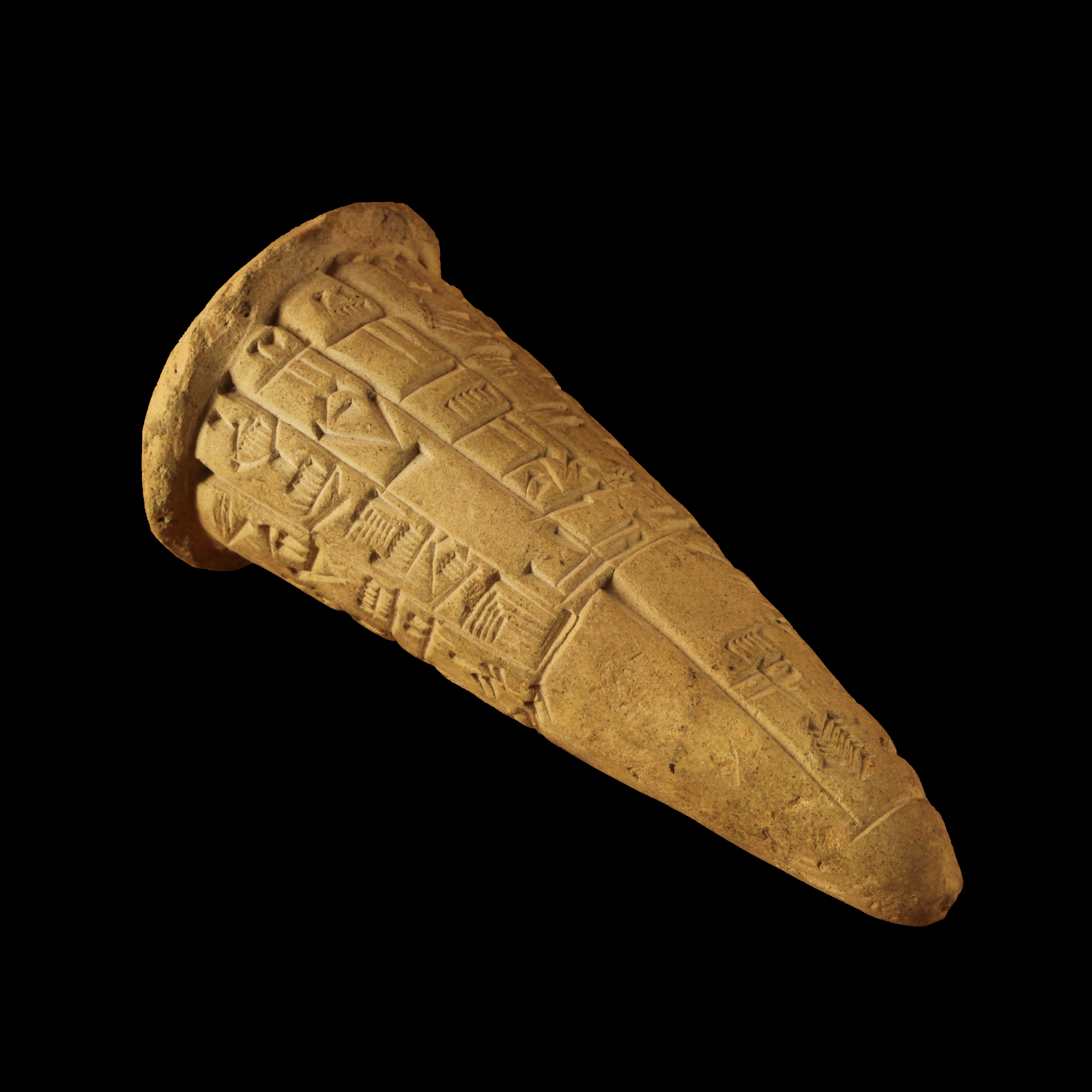
Foundation nail dedicated by Gudea to Ningirsu.

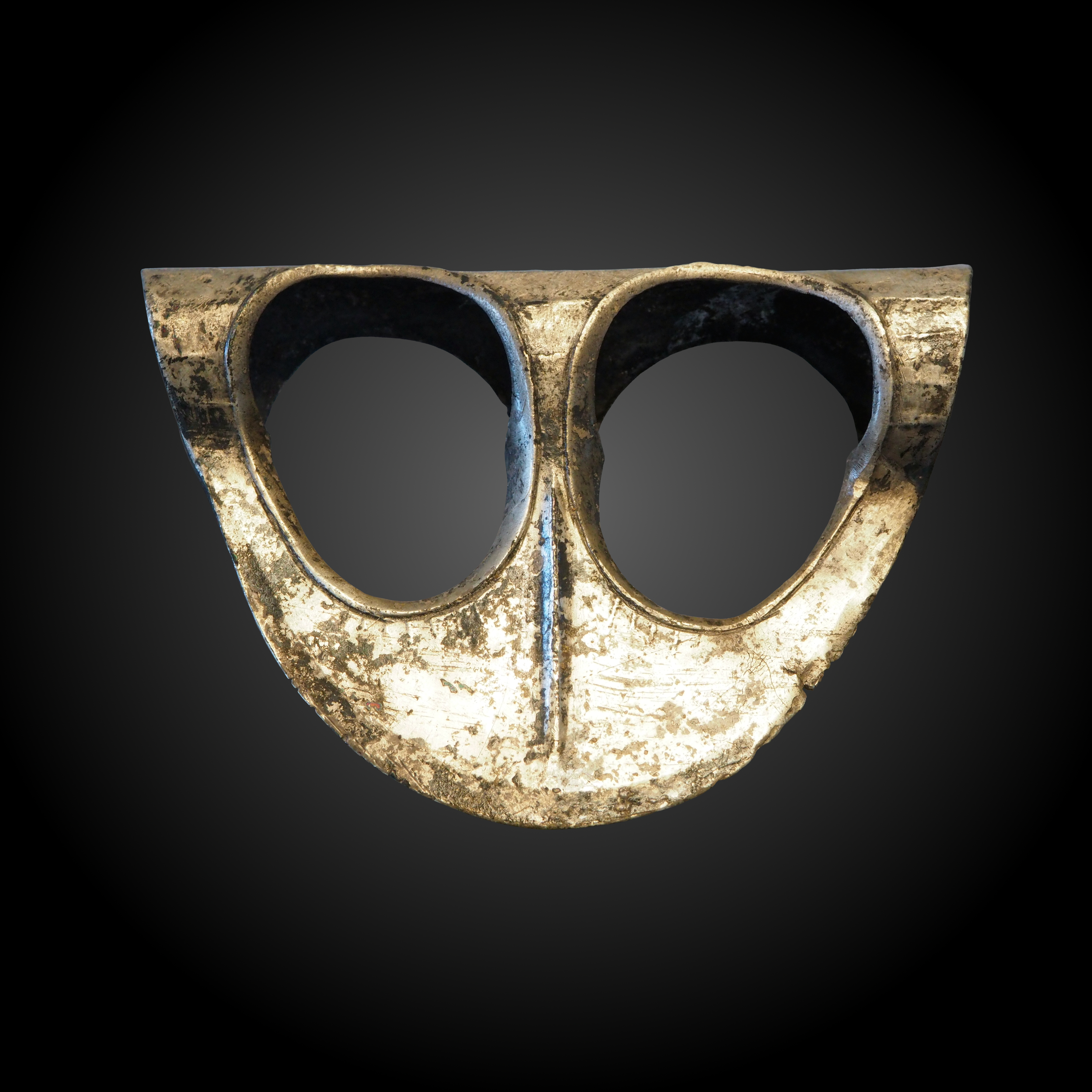
Fenestrated silver axehead, Middle Bronze Age, found near Byblos

== See also ==
- Builders' rites
- Cornerstone
