= Horse skulls =

Horse skull concealed under buildings

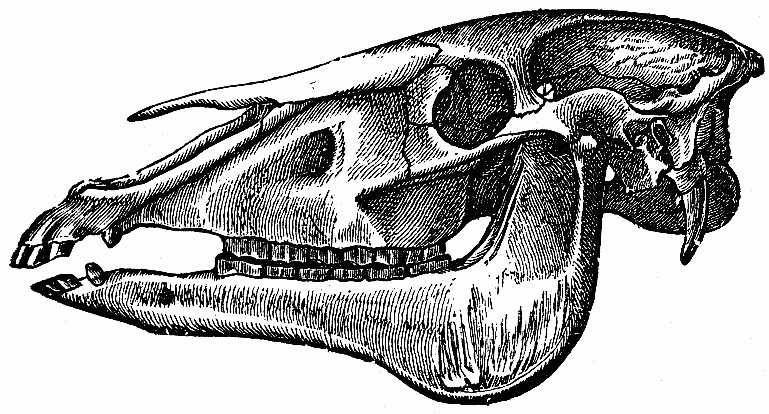
Skull of a horse

In Ireland, England, Wales, and the Scandinavian Peninsula, horse skulls have been found concealed in the structures of buildings, usually under the foundation or floor. Horse skulls have also been found in buildings in the United States, although in far fewer numbers. As part of the larger folk tradition of concealing objects in structures, horse skulls are related to concealed shoes, dried cats, and witch bottles.

There are two main theories as to the reason for depositing the horse skulls in buildings: as a method for enhancing the acoustics of a room, such as in a church or in a threshing barn; or as a method for repelling evil spirits such as witches and ghosts.

== See also ==
- Hobby horse
- Mari Lwyd

== Sources ==
- Hoggard, Brian (2004), "The archaeology of counter-witchcraft and popular magic", in Davies, Owen; De Blécourt, William (eds.), Beyond the Witchtrials: Witchcraft and Magic in Enlightenment Europe, Manchester University Press, ISBN 978-0-7190-6660-3
- Hukantaival, Sonja, Horse Skulls and "Alder Horses": The Horse as a Depositional Sacrifice in Buildings.
- Manning, M. Chris (2012), Homemade Magic: Concealed Deposits in Architectural Contexts in the Eastern United States Master's thesis, Anthropology Program, Ball State University, Muncie, IN.
- Merrifield, Ralph (1987), The Archaeology of Ritual and Magic, Batsford, ISBN 978-0-7134-4870-2
