= Namkha =

Tibetan form of yarn or thread cross

The namkha (Tibetan: nam mkha (ནམ་མཁའ་), 'sky', 'space', 'aether', 'heaven'), also known as Dö (Tibetan: mdos (མདོས)), is a form of yarn or thread cross composed traditionally of wool or silk and is a form of the endless knot of the Eight Auspicious Symbols (Ashtamangala). The structure is made of coloured threads wrapped around wooden sticks. Used in the rituals of Bön—the pre-Buddhist religion of Tibet—in reality this object represents the fundamental components and aspects of the energy of the individual, as defined from the conception until the birth of the individual.

== History ==
Knowledge about the use of namkha were almost completely lost, but in 1983 Chögyal Namkhai Norbu wrote a text entitled "The Preparation of Namkha which Harmonizes the Energy of the Elements", and in the same year gave oral teachings on namkha explaining that its function is to harmonize the elements of the individual and the various forms of energy related to them. Norbu's teachings on the namkha are collected in his book Namkha.

== Symbolism ==
Faithful to the meaning of space, both as origin and of indispensable support of the five material elements, the namkha as a whole represents the global space in which these interact. But while being founded on astrological calculations, and in fact certainly not being able to do without them, a namkha is not at all the equivalent of a three dimensional horoscope. It is not limited to a mere representation of the elements of the individual, but possesses a function, not just cognitive but operative. It is in fact a concrete, effective and extraordinary means to harmonize the energy of the individual, both internally and in relation to the total energy of the time and the universe as a whole.

== Uses ==
In certain tantric rituals, the namkha becomes a pure land abode of a deity while in other rites it may act as a snare for demons. Tradition holds that it was for this latter purpose that a namkha was used by Padmasambhava after his Vajrakilaya Dance during the consecration of Samye monastery during the first importation of Buddhism to Tibet. Weavings of a similar nature are called "God's eye" in Mexican, Peruvian, and Latin American folk art.

In the Bön and Vajrayana Buddhist traditions, a namkha is constructed as the temporary dwelling for a deity during ritual practice. The structure of the namkha is traditionally made with colored threads symbolic of the elements (blue, green, red, white, and yellow; space, air, fire, water, and earth respectively ), the sequence, and the shape of the namkha differing for each particular deity or yidam. The namkha is placed on the practitioner's altar or shrine and an image of the deity may be placed beneath. The namkha is often accompanied in rites and ritual workings with the tantric and shamanism tool, the phurba. Pearlman describes how Padmasambhava consecrated the land for the building of Samye Monastery by the enactment of the rite of the Vajrakilaya dance, which employed namkha to capture malevolent spirits.

== See also ==
- God's eye
- Nazar (amulet)
- Prayer flag
- Weaving (mythology)

== Works cited ==
- Norbu, Namkhai (1999). Namkha. Shang Shung Edizioni.
- Pearlman, Ellen (2002). Tibetan Sacred Dance: A Journey into the Religious and Folk Traditions. Rochester, Vermont, US: Inner Traditions. ISBN 978-0-89281-918-8.
