= Dried cat =

Dried cats put inside walls

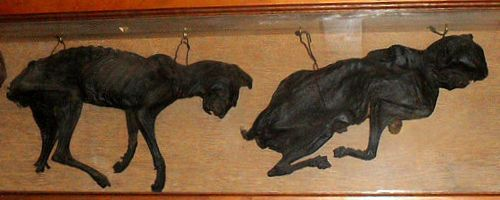
Dried cats from the Stag Inn, All Saints Street, Hastings

In some European cultures, it was customary to place the dried or desiccated body of a cat inside the walls of a newly built home to ward off evil spirits or as a good luck charm. It was thought that the cats had a sixth sense and that putting a cat in the wall was a blood sacrifice so the animal could use psychic abilities to find and ward off unwanted spirits. Although some accounts claim that the cats were walled in alive, examination of recovered specimens indicates post-mortem concealment in most cases.

== Origins ==
In the British Isles, as well as in Northern Europe and North America, the dried or mummified bodies of cats are frequently found concealed within structures and are believed to have been placed there to bring good luck or to protect the building and its occupants from harm. The North American instances are strongly associated with European households and are most often found in buildings where shoes and witch bottles are also concealed. In some cases, the animals are found deliberately posed as if in the midst of attack. In other cases, they are accompanied by dried rats, mice, or birds.

Historian Ian Evans stated in an interview that this was part of a secret folk magic practice that may have come from the Romans to the British and then to Australia as well. Evans has also launched the Tasmanian Magic Project in an effort to understand the history of this practice in Australia.

Sometimes when the animals are discovered, as in the case of a mummified cat and kittens, it might be assumed that the animal was just accidentally there and got stuck. However, there are times when the animals are found in locations that it would have been impossible for them to have gotten into accidentally such as being encased in a brick cavity.

== Mummification of cats in ancient Egypt ==
Cats in ancient Egypt were represented in social and religious practices of Ancient Egypt for more than 3000 years. Several ancient Egyptian deities were depicted and sculptured with cat-like heads such as Mafdet, Bastet and Sekhmet, representing justice, fertility and power. The deity Mut was also depicted as a cat and in the company of a cat.

Cats were praised for killing venomous snakes and protecting the pharaoh since at least the First Dynasty of Egypt. Skeletal remains of cats were found among funerary goods dating to the 12th Dynasty. The protective function of cats is indicated in the Book of the Dead, where a cat represents Ra and the benefits of the sun for life on Earth. Cat-shaped decorations used during the New Kingdom of Egypt indicate that the cat cult became more popular in daily life. Cats were depicted in association with the name of Bastet.

Cat cemeteries at the archaeological sites Speos Artemidos, Bubastis and Saqqara were used for several centuries. They contained vast numbers of cat mummies and cat statues that are exhibited in museum collections worldwide. Among the mummified animals excavated in Gizeh, the African wildcat (Felis lybica) is the most common cat followed by the jungle cat (Felis chaus). In view of the huge number of cat mummies found in Egypt, the cat cult was certainly important for the country's economy, as it required breeding of cats and a trading network for the supply of food, oils and resins for embalming them.

== See also ==
- Apotropaic magic
- Church grim
- Concealed shoes
- Horse skulls
- Witch bottles
