= Yard globe =

Lawn ornament

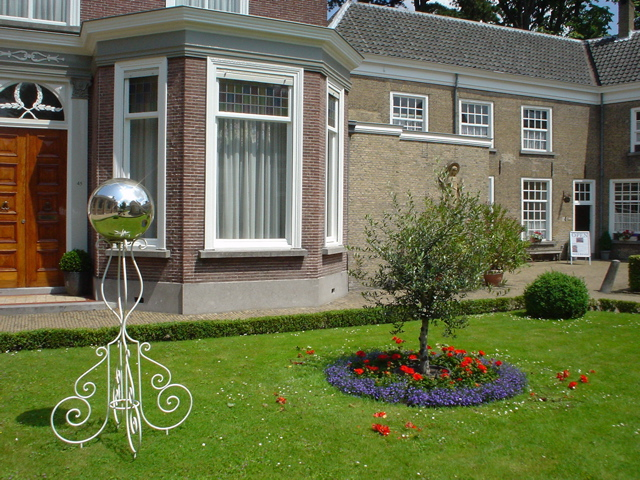
A gazing ball in a garden located in Breda, Netherlands

A yard globe (also known as a garden globe, gazing ball or chrome ball) is a mirrored sphere displayed as a lawn ornament, typically atop a conical ceramic or wrought iron stand. Sizes ranges from 25 mm (1 in) up to 10 m (33 ft) in diameter, with the most popular gazing ball being 300 mm (12 in). Gazing balls were originally made of glass, but may now be made of stainless steel, acrylic, ceramic, or stained glass.

Unlike hanging friendship balls or witch balls that have a loop, gazing balls come in a variety, with some having a stem so they can securely sit in a stand, while others are more uniform in shape and can sit on grass. Larger sizes can be made but prove difficult to place on the stand due to the weight of the globe.

== History ==
Gazing balls originated in 13th century Venice, Italy, where they were hand-blown by skilled craftsmen.

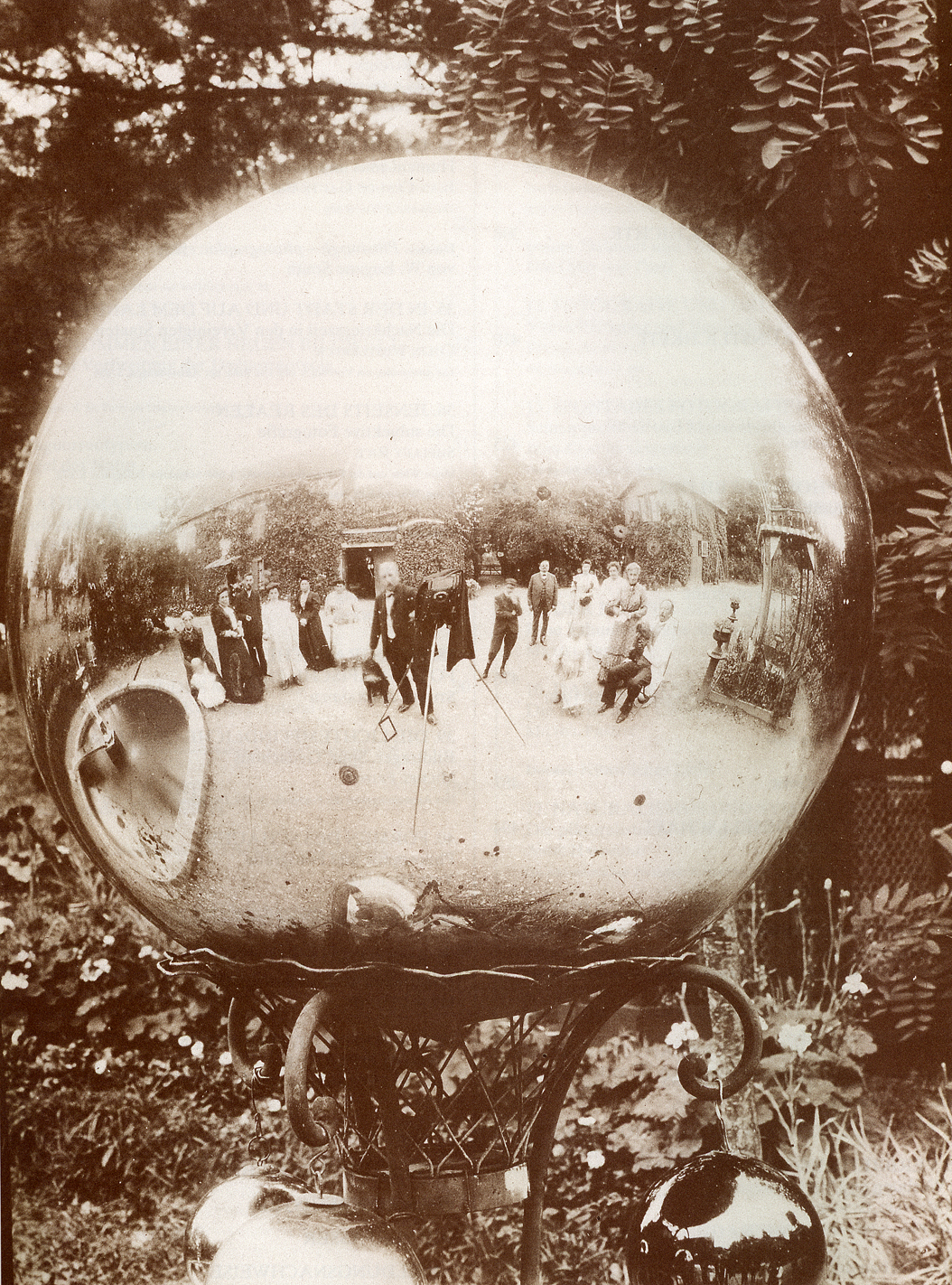
1910s photograph of a garden globe

King Ludwig II of Bavaria, sometimes referred to as Mad King Ludwig, is said to have adorned his Herrenchiemsee palace with lawn balls; however, the palace and gardens were never finished after Ludwig died in 1885. Sometime later the gardens, based on Versailles, were open to the public and visitors may have seen the lawn balls, but the Victorian period was quickly coming to an end. By the 1880s and 90s the nature of English landscape was changing dramatically with William Robinson's and Gertrude Jekyll's designs. It would be difficult to say that Mad King Ludwig had much influence in the area of garden ornaments.

Gazing balls enjoyed a brief resurgence in popularity in the 1930s. They appear in a number of modernistic gardens of the period as a variation on the traditional sundial or birdbath centrepiece. Many of them from this period may have been made in polished metal rather than glass.

Their popularity was probably influenced by the illuminated glass globe which was the central focal point of the modernist garden shown at the Exposition Internationale des Arts Decoratifs et Industriels Modernes, Paris, in 1925. The "Jardin d’Eau et de Lumière" was triangular in shape, largely consisting of tiered triangular reflecting pools and planting beds. At the center of the ensemble was an electrically propelled and internally illuminated sphere of stained glass. "The mirror globe turning slowly to reflect lights is rather a night-club trick than a serious attempt at garden decoration. But it is completely successful in focusing the interest and relieving, by its unexpected location, what would otherwise be an altogether stiff pattern."

Other modernist garden designs followed, using plain metal or glass mirror globes; notable examples included several roof top gardens developed by Department Stores in London, America and Australia.

The gazing ball suited the geometric clean lines of the Art Deco style especially the visual connection with the chrome plating which was part of the Streamline-moderne aesthetic of the 1930s and 1940s – so much so in fact that they became identified in many people's minds as an invention of the 1930s.

Subsequently, many people in the 1950s and afterwards viewed them as a bit tacky; an example of prosaic suburban taste of the interwar period on a level with garden gnomes – they have never quite regained status.

Since the early 21st century, the American artist Jeff Koons has frequently incorporated gazing balls in his artworks.

== See also ==
- Christmas ornament
- Crystal ball
- Front yard
- Garden ornament
- Hand with Reflecting Sphere
- Kugel fountain
