= The Archaeology of Ritual and Magic =

Book by Ralph Merrifield

- The first edition cover of the book, depicting a 17th-century bellarmine witch-bottle found in an old mill-stream, Great College Street, London
- Author: Ralph Merrifield
- Language: English
- Subject: Archaeology; Magic
- Publisher: B.T. Batsford
- Publication date: 1987
- Publication place: United Kingdom
- Media type: Print (hardback & paperback)
- Pages: 224
- ISBN: 0-7134-4870-9

The Archaeology of Ritual and Magic is an archaeological study of the material evidence for ritual and magical practices in Europe, containing a particular emphasis on London and South East England. It was written by the English archaeologist Ralph Merrifield, the former deputy director of the Museum of London, and first published by B.T. Batsford in 1987.

Merrifield opens The Archaeology of Ritual and Magic by discussing how archaeologists have understood magic and ritual practices in past societies, opining that on the whole it had been a neglected area of study. Looking at the archaeological evidence for ritual activity in the pre-Roman Iron Age and the Roman Iron Age of Britain, he discusses animal and human sacrifice, as well as the offering of votive deposits in rivers and other bodies of water. He moves on to explore the rituals surrounding death and burial, suggesting areas where this ritual activity is visible in the burial record of multiple societies. Merrifield goes on to discuss the archaeological evidence for ritual practices in Christian Europe, highlighting areas of ritual continuance from earlier pagan periods, in particular the deposition of metal goods in water. Looking at the evidence for foundation deposits in European buildings that likely had magico-religious purposes, he then looks at several examples of written charms and spells which have survived in the archaeological record.

Upon publication, The Archaeology of Ritual and Magic received predominantly positive reviews in academic peer-reviewed journals such as Folklore and The Antiquaries Journal. In the ensuing years, the book has been widely cited by scholars as an influential and pioneering text in the study of the archaeology of ritual and magic.

== Background ==
Ralph Merrifield (1913–1995) was born and raised in Brighton, and, following an education at Varndean Grammar School, he worked at Brighton Museum. Gaining a London External Degree in anthropology in 1935, he developed a lifelong interest in the religious and magical beliefs of England. After serving in the Royal Air Force during the Second World War, he returned to working at Brighton Museum, but in 1950 was appointed Assistant Keeper of the Guildhall Museum in the City of London. Over a six-month period in 1956 and 1957, he was stationed in Accra, Ghana, where he worked at the National Museum of Ghana, organising the collection in preparation for the country's independence from the British Empire in March 1957. Returning to the Guildhall Museum, Merrifield compiled the first detailed study of Roman London for 35 years, which was published as The Roman City of London (1965). Following the creation of the Museum of London in 1975, he became its deputy director, a post which he held until his retirement in 1978.

In the preface of The Archaeology of Ritual and Magic, Merrifield noted that the book's bias was to the archaeology of London, and that this was particularly evident in its use of illustrations. He dedicated the book to the memory of H.S. Toms, the former Curator of Brighton Museum and a one-time assistant to the archaeologist Augustus Pitt Rivers; in his dedication, Merrifield noted that Toms had been his "first mentor in archaeology and folk studies".

== Synopsis ==
"Ritual and magic were formerly part of everyday life, but by association with fantasy fiction and occultism they have now acquired an aura of sensationalism that has discouraged investigation. In spite of the great interest of this aspect of human behaviour, no synthesis has hitherto been made of the considerable information that is available from archaeological and historical sources, except within a few very restricted fields. A broad survey of the ritual customs of Europe is attempted here."

— Ralph Merrifield, 1987.

In his preface, Merrifield noted that while archaeologists studying prehistoric periods have paid increasing attention to the evidence for ritual and magic in the archaeological record, their counterparts working in later historical periods have failed to follow their lead. Presenting this book as a rectifier, he outlines his intentions and the study's limitations.

Chapter one, "Ritual and the archaeologist", begins by describing the ritual deposits from the pre-Roman Iron Age sites of Cadbury Castle and Danebury, hillforts in southern Britain. Merrifield laments the fact that the majority of archaeologists, particularly those studying literate, historical periods, have avoided ritual explanations for unusual phenomena in the archaeological record; he believes that they exhibit a "ritual phobia". He contrasts this view with that of those archaeologists studying the Neolithic and Bronze Age Britain, who have widely accepted the ritual uses of chambered tombs and stone circles. He specifies particular definitions for words such as "ritual", "religion" and "superstition", arguing that such terms must be used with precision by archaeologists. Offering a case study, he describes how Neolithic stone axes were adopted as amulets or talismans in the later Roman Iron Age onward in Britain, and that as such archaeologists should expect to find them in non-prehistoric contexts.

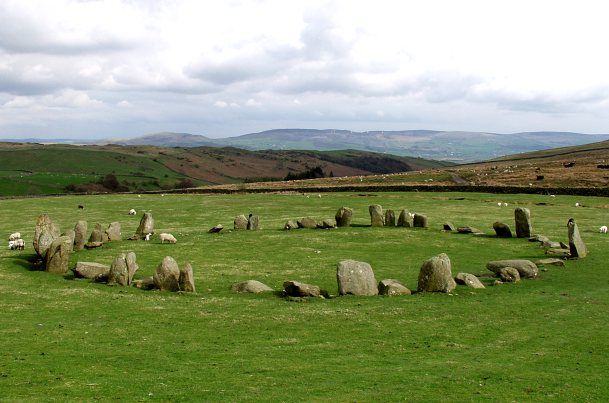
Merrifield noted that archaeologists studying Neolithic and Bronze Age Europe regularly recognised the ritual significance of monuments, such as this stone circle at Swinside, England, but that those studying later periods of history often neglected to consider ritual explanations.

In the second chapter, "Offerings to earth and water in Pre-Roman and Roman Times", Merrifield explores the various forms of archaeological evidence for ritual deposits in the pre-Roman Iron Age and the Roman Iron Age of Britain. He provides an overview of the evidence for animal and human sacrifice, as well as that in support of ritual offerings in bodies of water such as the River Thames. Merrifield deals with votive deposits on land, in particular looking at the evidence for deposition in ditches, shafts and wells. He rounds off the chapter by examining evidence for Iron Age rituals that took place at the commencement and termination of building constructions. Chapter three, "Rituals of Death", deals with the religious rituals accompanying death and burial, and their visibility in the archaeological record. It explains the three main ways in which human communities have dealt with the corpses of the dead: through exposing them to elements and scavengers, through inhumation and through cremation. Looking at beliefs surrounding the afterlife, Merrifield discusses ways in which these beliefs might be visible in the archaeological record, such as through the deposition of grave goods. Discussing evidence for rituals of separation through which the deceased is separated from the world of the living, including those that deal with the decapitation of the body, Merrifield then looks at the effect of Christianity on burials in Europe, arguing that it brought a new intimacy with the dead through the collection of relics, which was in contrast to the pagan beliefs of the Roman Empire, which portrayed the deceased as unclean.

The fourth chapter, "From Paganism to Christianity", explores the continuing practice of ritual in Christian Europe. Discussing the early Roman Catholic Church's demonisation of pagan deities, Merrifield states that the Church continued propagating a form of polytheism through the "cult of the blessed dead", the veneration of saints and martyrs, throughout the Middle Ages. Discussing the ritual use of Christian relics, he also looks at votive offerings that were presented in a Christian context at shrines and churches, paying particular reference to the tradition of offering bent coins to shrines in Late Medieval England. Examining the construction of churches on earlier pagan ritual sites, he deals with evidence for the destruction of pagan statues by the early Christians.

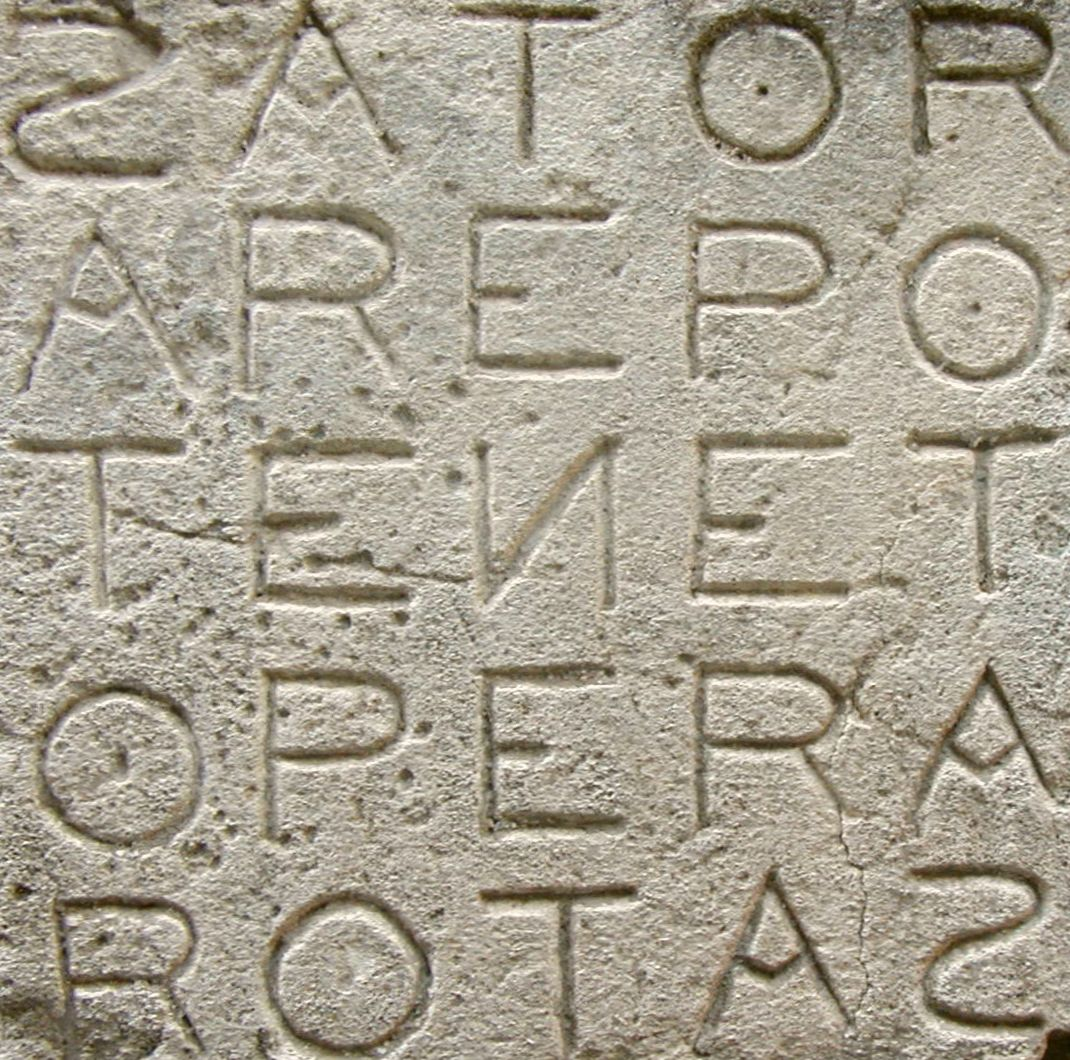
An example of the Sator Square, a magical practice widely found throughout Europe from ancient times to the present day; this example is from Oppède in France.

Chapter five, "Survivals, revivals and reinterpretations", continues Merrifield's exploration of ritual practices in Christian Europe. He examines Late- and Post-Medieval items that have been deposited in rivers, including swords and pilgrimage souvenirs, speculating that their deposition might represent a survival from the pagan tradition of casting votive offerings into water. He speculates that the contemporary practice of throwing a coin into a fountain for good luck is a further survival of the custom. He then discusses the evidence for ritual foundation deposits under buildings, noting the widespread Medieval deposition of an animal's head or jaw in a construction's foundations, presumably for protective magical purposes. Proceeding to deal with the Late- and Post-Medieval deposition of pots under foundations, he looks at their place in churches, where it was believed that they aided the acoustics. Continuing with this theme, he discusses the British folk custom of burying a horse's head under the floor to improve a building's acoustics, speculating as to whether this was a survival of the pagan foundation deposit custom. Rounding off the chapter, Merrifield examines magical items that have been intentionally placed in the walls, chimneys and roofs of buildings in Britain, in particular the widespread use of dead cats and old shoes.

In the sixth chapter, "Written spells and charms", Merrifield discusses the use of the written word in magical contexts. Highlighting archaeological examples from the ancient Graeco-Roman world, he looks at inscriptions on lead tablets that were buried in cemeteries and amphitheatres, both places associated with the dead. Moving on to the use of magic squares, Merrifield highlights various examples of the Sator square in archaeological contexts, before also discussing squares that contained numerical data with astrological significance. He rounds off the chapter with an examination of Post-Medieval curses and charms containing the written word, citing examples that have been found by archaeologists across Britain, hidden inside various parts of buildings. In the seventh chapter, "Charms against witchcraft", he deals with archaeological evidence for a variety of Early Modern and Modern British spells designed to ward off malevolent witchcraft. After briefly discussing the role of holed stone charms, he looks at the evidence for witch bottles, making reference to their relation to beliefs about witches' familiars. Proceeding to focus on 19th- and 20th-century examples, Merrifield discusses the case of James Murrell, an English cunning man, and his involvement with the witch bottle tradition. Merrifield's final chapter, "The ritual of superstition: recognition and potential for study", provides an overview of the entire book, highlighting the evidence of ritual continuity from pre-Christian periods to the present day. Pointing out what he sees as areas of further exploration for archaeologists, he calls for a "systematic investigation" of the subject.

== Reception and recognition ==
=== Academic reviews ===
The Archaeology of Ritual and Magic was reviewed by John Hutchings for the Folklore journal, the published arm of The Folklore Society. He highlighted how the work would be of benefit to folklorists, by putting various charms then in museum exhibits – such as dead cats, buried shoes and witch bottles – into the wider context of ritual activity. He opined that it was "a little disappointing" that the examples were almost all from London and the Home Counties, but described the book as "lucidly written, carefully argued, and well illustrated."

In a short review for The Antiquaries Journal, the historian of religion Hilda Ellis Davidson praised the "cautious and balanced arguments" of Merrifield's work. She opined that it should be read by every archaeologist as a corrective to what she thought was their widespread ignorance of folklore, noting that the wide array of evidence for ritual behaviour in the archaeological record would surprise "many readers".

=== Wider recognition ===
Writing Merrifield's obituary for The Independent newspaper, the Museum of London archaeologist Peter Marsden described The Archaeology of Ritual and Magic as "a masterly study of an unusual subject." The importance of Merrifield's book was discussed by the Englishman Brian Hoggard, an independent researcher who authored a 2004 academic paper entitled "The archaeology of counter-witchcraft and popular magic". Being published in the Beyond the Witch Trials anthology, edited by the historians Owen Davies and Willem de Blécourt, Hoggard recounted that The Archaeology of Ritual and Magic was the "notable exception" to a trend in which archaeological studies of magic were restricted to small journals, magazines and newspaper articles.

The influential nature of Merrifield's work was also recognised by the medieval archaeologist Roberta Gilchrist of the University of Reading. In an academic paper published in a 2008 edition of the Medieval Archaeology journal, Gilchrist referenced Merrifield's study, noting that it offered a "rare contribution" to the archaeology of ritual and magic in Britain. In particular she highlighted his belief that many archaeologists dealing with literate cultures exhibited a "ritual phobia" as accurate.
