= Shamanism: Archaic Techniques of Ecstasy =

1951 book by Mircea Eliade

- The first edition of Eliade's Le Chamanisme et les techniques archaïques de l'extase, 1951
- Author: Mircea Eliade
- Language: French
- Subject: Shamanism
- Publisher: Librarie Payot
- Publication date: 1951
- Publication place: France, United States
- English publication date: 1964
- Media type: Print (Hardcover & Paperback)

Shamanism: Archaic Techniques of Ecstasy is a historical study of the different forms of shamanism around the world written by the Romanian historian of religion Mircea Eliade. It was first published in France by Librarie Payot under the French title of Le Chamanisme et les techniques archaïques de l'extase in 1951. The book was subsequently translated into English by Willard R. Trask and published by Princeton University Press in 1964.

At the time of the book's writing, Eliade had earned a PhD studying Hinduism in India before becoming involved with far right politics in his native Romania. After the rise of the communist government, he fled to Paris, France, in 1945, where he took up an academic position and began studying shamanism, authoring several academic papers on the subject before publishing his book.

The first half of Shamanism deals with the various elements of shamanic practice, such as the nature of initiatory sickness and dreams, the method for obtaining shamanic powers, the role of shamanic initiation and the symbolism of the shaman's costume and drum. The book's second half looks at the development of shamanism in each region of the world where it is found, including Central and North Asia, the Americas, Southeastern Asia and Oceania and also Tibet, China and the Far East. Eliade argues that all of these shamanisms must have had a common source as the original religion of humanity in the Palaeolithic.

On publication, Eliade's book was recognised as a seminal and authoritative study on the subject of shamanism. In later decades, as anthropological and historical scholarship increased and improved, elements of the book came under increasing scrutiny, as did Eliade's argument that there was a global phenomenon that could be termed "shamanism" or that all shamanisms had a common source. His book also proved to be a significant influence over the Neoshamanic movement which developed in the western world in the 1960s and 1970s.

== Background ==
Mircea Eliade was born in Bucharest, Romania, in 1907. Attending the Spiru Haret National College, he subsequently studied at the University of Bucharest's Faculty of Philosophy and Letters from 1925 through to 1928. Traveling to India to study the country's religions, in 1933 he received his PhD for a thesis devoted to a discussion of Yoga. Writing for the nationalist newspaper Cuvântul, he spoke out against antisemitism but became associated with the Iron Guard, a Romanian fascist group. Arrested for his involvement in the far right, following his release in 1940 he gained employment as a cultural attaché to both the United Kingdom and then Portugal. Following the Second World War, Eliade moved to Paris, France, fearing the rise of a communist government in Romania. Here, he married for a second time, to the Romanian exile Christinel Cotescu.

Together with Emil Cioran and other Romanian expatriates, Eliade rallied with the former diplomat Alexandru Busuioceanu, helping him publicize anti-communist opinion to the Western European public. In 1947, he was facing material constraints, and Ananda Coomaraswamy found him a job as a French-language teacher in the United States, at a school in Arizona; the arrangement ended upon Coomaraswamy's death in September. Beginning in 1948, he wrote for the journal Critique, edited by French thinker Georges Bataille. The following year, he went on a visit to Italy, where he wrote the first 300 pages of his novel Noaptea de Sânziene (he visited the country a third time in 1952). He collaborated with Carl Jung and the Eranos circle after Henry Corbin recommended him in 1949, and co-edited the Antaios magazine with Ernst Jünger. In 1950, Eliade began attending Eranos conferences, meeting Jung, Olga Fröbe-Kapteyn, Gershom Scholem and Paul Radin. He described Eranos as "one of the most creative cultural experiences of the modern Western world."

Working from France, Eliade had begun to study shamanism from a global perspective, publishing three papers on the subject: "Le Probléme du chamanisme" in the Revue de l'histoire des religions journal (1946), "Shamanism" in Forgotten Religions, an anthology edited by Vergilius Ferm (1949), and "Einführende Betrachtungen über den Schamanismus" in the Paideuma journal (1951). He had also lectured on the subject in March 1950 at both the University of Rome and the Instituto Italiano per il Medio ed Estremo Oriente.

== Synopsis ==
"To the best of our knowledge the present book is the first to cover the entire phenomenon of shamanism and at the same time to situate it in the general history of religion. To say this is to imply its liability to imperfection and approximation and the risks that it takes."

— Mircea Eliade, 1951.

In his foreword, Eliade explains the approach that he has taken in the book, noting that his intention is to situate world shamanism within the larger history of religion. Disputing any claims that shamanism is a result of mental illness, he highlights the benefits that further sociological and ethnographic research could provide before explaining the role of a historian of religions. Describing shamanism as "precisely one of the archaic techniques of ecstasy", he proclaims that it is "at once mysticism, magic and "religion" in the broadest sense of the term."

Chapter one, "General Considerations. Recruiting Methods. Shamanism and Mystical Vocation", details Eliade's exploration of the etymology and terminological usage of the word "shamanism".

== Arguments ==
=== Definition of "shamanism" ===
Within his study of the subject, Eliade proposed several different definitions of the word "shamanism". The first of these was that shamanism simply constituted a "technique of ecstasy", and in Eliade's opinion, this was the "least hazardous" definition. Shamanism is a flexible custom that is embedded in a framework of cosmological beliefs and practices. Shamans believe there is a spiritual connection between everything in the universe, and therefore, do not consider Shamanism to be a religion, nor a science. Instead, Shamanism can be viewed as healing or helping technology. For Shamans to access the power they are given by spirits, they go on a spiritual journey. Other definitions for the word "shamanism" are used interchangeably. "Medicine man", "sorcerer", "spirit healer", and "magician" are a few examples used to describe people with these "magico-religious" powers. These "magico-religious" people, or Shamans, believed in and used unconventional techniques in their flexible practices—like spirits, sacred herbs, and the supernatural—in order to heal other people. Shamans are theoretically justified in their practice and can be known as masters of spirits who have a specific group of mastered spirits.

== Reception ==
Discussing the Norse practice of Seiðr in her book Gods and Myths of Northern Europe (1964), the academic Hilda Ellis Davidson described Eliade's French-language book as the "fullest recent study of shamanism".

Criticism of some of Eliade's positions came from the English historian Ronald Hutton of the University of Bristol in his book, Shamans: Siberian Spirituality and the Western Imagination (2001). Hutton took issue with Eliade's claim that divination only played a minor role in Siberian shamanism, claiming that Eliade had produced no data to substantiate such an assertion, and that the ethnographic evidence actually indicated that the opposite was true. He saw this as part of a wider problem whereby Eliade had ignored certain "varieties of native practitioner" from his "chosen image of shaman" and had been "intent on generalizations." Hutton also argued that Eliade's description of traditional Siberian cosmology oversimplified great diversity among the various Siberian indigenous groups and that Eliade's claims that Siberian shamanism revolved around a vision of death and rebirth was similarly erroneous.

"Several of [Eliade's] grand cross-cultural themes – the sky god, the quest, the sacred center – as well as the tension between historical specificity and synchronic themes, loom large in Shamanism, which remains one of his most interesting, important, and influential books."

— Wendy Doniger on Shamanism, 2004.

For the 2004 English-language re-publication of Shamanism by Princeton University Press, a new foreword was commissioned from the academic Indologist Wendy Doniger. At the time, Doniger held the position of Mircea Eliade Professor of the History of Religions at the University of Chicago. Having been a personal friend and colleague of his for many years, Doniger used her foreword to defend him from accusations that he was either a fascist or an anti-semite, and evaluated his work in Shamanism. Drawing comparisons with anthropologist James Frazer and philologist Max Müller, she accepted that while he advanced the knowledge of his time "within a body of assumptions that we no longer accept", his work inspired "an entire generation" of scholars and amateurs in the study of religion.
