= Shamans (Hutton book) =

2001 book by Ronald Hutton

Shamans: Siberian Spirituality and the Western Imagination
- The first edition cover of Hutton's book, with a jacket design by Ivor Claydon Graphics
- Author: Ronald Hutton
- Language: English
- Subject: Religious history
- Publisher: Hambledon and London
- Publication date: 2001
- Publication place: United Kingdom
- Media type: Print (Hardcover & Paperback)
- Pages: 220
- ISBN: 978-1852853020

Shamans: Siberian Spirituality and the Western Imagination is a historical study of how westerners have viewed the shamans of Siberia. It was written by the English historian Ronald Hutton, then working at the University of Bristol, and first published by Hambledon and London in 2001. Prior to writing Shamans, Hutton had authored a series of books on such subjects as early modern Britain, pre-Christian religion, British folklore and contemporary Paganism.

The book is divided into three sections. The first looks at how Russians and other westerners have understood Siberia and its shamanic practitioners from the Middle Ages to the present day. Specifically, it looks at how the concept of Siberia was created by the invading Russians, and how the governments of the Russian Empire and then the Soviet Union interacted with the many ethnic groups who lived there, and how they dealt with its indigenous shamanic beliefs. The second section highlights the difficulty with the concept of shamanism, which has never been strictly defined by scholars. Hutton goes on to explore the various traits associated with shamanic beliefs and practices in Siberia, looking at cosmology, equipment and costume, and their ritual performances; throughout, the author emphasises the great diversity among the shamans of this region. In the third section, Hutton looks at the historical development of shamanic beliefs both in Siberia and in other parts of Eurasia. Finally, he turns his attention to the current state of shamanism in Siberia and the influence of neoshamanism.

Academic reviews published in peer-reviewed journals such as Folklore and the Journal for the Academic Study of Magic were predominantly positive. The archaeologist Neil Price however noted a problem in Hutton's discussion of shamanistic beliefs in Scandinavia.

== Background ==
Born in 1953, Ronald Hutton studied history at Pembroke College, Cambridge, before going on for postgraduate study at Magdalen College, Oxford. In 1981, he was hired as a reader in history at the University of Bristol, where he wrote a series of four books devoted to 17th century Britain. In 1991, he published his first study of pre-Christian religion, The Pagan Religions of the Ancient British Isles, based on his longstanding interest in British archaeology. He followed this with two studies of British folkloric customs, The Rise and Fall of Merry England (1994) and The Stations of the Sun (1996), and then The Triumph of the Moon (1999), a history of Wicca. With Shamans he continued his research into pre-Christian religious beliefs and the manner in which they altered and interacted following Christianisation.

== Synopsis ==
In the introduction, Hutton notes that since the 1970s, four distinct definitions of "shamanism" have been adopted by anthropologists and scholars of religious studies. The first holds that shamanism refers to any practice in which an individual "contacts a spirit world while in an altered state of consciousness." The second reserves the term for those professionals who perform such practices at the request of others. A third definition attempts to distinguish shamans from other magico-religious specialists such as "mediums", "witch doctors", "spiritual healers" and "prophets" by certain techniques; Hutton notes that this is the definition most commonly used by modern scholars. The fourth definition makes use of the term purely to refer to the religious beliefs of Siberia and neighbouring parts of Asia, but Hutton criticises such a definition, considering it illogical.

=== Part One: Why we think we know about shamans ===
Chapter one, "The Creation of Siberia", looks at how the region of Siberia in central and eastern Russia first came to be defined by the Europeans living in the west. Hutton then discusses the immense size of the region, its climate and also its geography. The second chapter, "The Creation of Shamans", looks at how the Russian authorities came to categorise the indigenous peoples of Siberia, transforming 120 distinct linguistic groups into 35 "nationalities" for the purposes of ruling over them. It proceeds to discuss the cultural and ethnic genocide of Siberian native groups by the Russian government, and then highlights the great flexibility and change that occurred within indigenous Siberian society over the centuries.

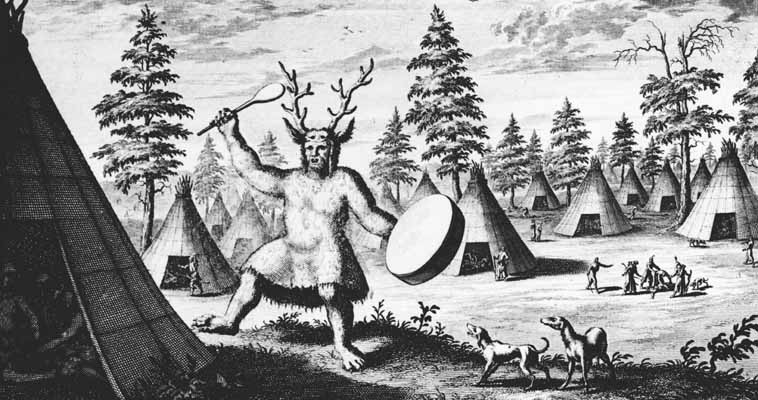
The earliest known depiction of a Siberian shaman, produced by the Dutch explorer Nicolaes Witsen, who authored an account of his travels among Samoyedic- and Tungusic-speaking peoples in 1692. Witsen labelled the illustration as a "Priest of the Devil" and gave this figure clawed feet to highlight his demonic qualities.

In the third chapter, "The Transformation of Siberians", Hutton discusses the Russian conquest of Siberia, which largely took place between circa 1580 and 1650. He highlights the economic reasons for the invasion, which were largely the result of the fur trade, and notes that under Russian rule, the overall population of indigenous peoples in Siberia increased. He goes on to discuss how the increasing eastward migration of European populations from Russia affected the natives, as well as examining the impact of Christianity, Islam and Buddhism, all foreign religions which were introduced and interacted with the indigenous Siberian beliefs, often creating a syncretic blend. In the last part of the chapter, he looks at the persecution of shamans and other indigenous magico-religious practitioners by both Christian Russian authorities and later the Marxist–Leninist administration of the Soviet Union, noting that such traditional practices had been entirely eradicated by the 1980s.

The fourth chapter, "The Records of Shamanism", deals with the many European accounts of shamanic and related practices in Siberia. Hutton opens it by reference to Marco Polo's 13th-century account of a magico-religious practitioner in south-west China, which bore similarities with later accounts from neighbouring Mongolia and Siberia. Carrying on with this approach, he refers to the Franciscan friar William of Rubruck's 1254 account of a Mongol magician. He then discusses the earliest European account of Siberian shamans, produced by the Englishman Richard Johnson in 1557, and the later 1692 account by Dutchman Nicolaes Witsen. Moving on, Hutton looks at various 18th-century accounts, most of which were produced by scientists sent by the Russian government to report on the human and natural resources of the Siberian region, and highlights the negative attitude in which they discuss the shamans, largely viewing them as tricksters and con men. Hutton proceeds to discuss the emergence of anthropology and the manner in which anthropologists began to study the shamans of Siberia, explaining that they usually took a more sympathetic attitude than their predecessors. He finally deals with the role of Soviet anthropologists in not only documenting the vestiges of shamanism, but also aiding in its destruction.

=== Part Two: What we think we know about shamans ===
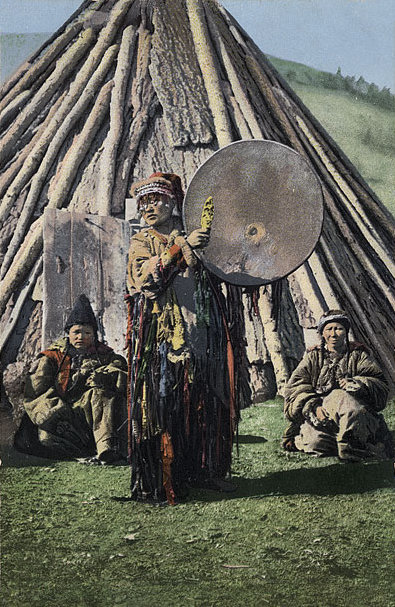
Russian postcard based on a photo taken in 1908 by S. I. Borisov, showing a female shaman, of probable Khakas ethnicity

Chapter five, "What Shamans Did", offers Hutton's exploration of what can be said for certain about the shamans of Siberia. He notes that the term "shaman" was a "crude" label that has been used to refer to a wide variety of different magico-religious practitioners within the Siberian region, and also highlights the fact that the role of the shaman was rarely central to Indigenous Siberian religion. He emphasises that among different tribal groups, shamans served different individuals, and performed different functions in society, although were typically involved in healing and divinatory practices. The sixth chapter, "Shamanic Cosmologies", notes three cosmological concepts widespread among Indigenous Siberians: "the beliefs that even apparently inanimate objects were inhabited by spirit-forms; that the world was structured on a number of different levels; and that living beings possessed more than one 'soul' or animating force." Noting that scholars can only truly discuss shamanism based on evidence from the 19th and 20th centuries, when such beliefs had already begun to syncretically mix with incoming foreign religious movements, he then goes on to discuss the myriad different types of spirit assistants found in the cosmologies of Siberia. Throughout this, he emphasises the huge variation within the Siberian region, with different cultural and ethnic groups holding different beliefs about the structure of the cosmos and the relationship between the shaman and those spirits with whom they worked. Criticising the Romanian historian of religion Mircea Eliade for claiming that all Siberian shamans controlled spirits rather than being possessed and controlled by them, Hutton provides evidence to the contrary, highlighting that in certain areas, shamans simply placated spirits rather than controlling them. He then goes on to discuss the western rationalist view that the spirits worked with by shamans were actually altered states of mind existing within the shaman's imagination.

Chapter seven, "Shamanic Apprenticeship and Equipment", explores the nature of hereditary apprenticeships among Siberian shamans, as well as looking at the concept of a "shamanic illness" through which the individual had to undergo great suffering before they could gain their powers. Exploring the training of a shaman, Hutton criticises Eliade's idea that a vision of death and rebirth was universally intrinsic to shamanism, highlighting that it wasn't even found across the entirety of Siberia, let alone the world. Instead, he states that the "truly universal pattern" was that of the "period of withdrawal" that the trainee shaman undertook before entering the profession, when their rite of passage would come to an end and they would be recognised by both pre-existing shamans and their clientele. Moving on to a discussion of paraphernalia and costume, he argues that the inclusion of at least one shamanic item was standard across Siberia.

In the eighth chapter, "Shamanic Performance", Hutton describes Siberian shamans as "performing artists", although notes that there was great variation in what these performances actually entailed. Discussing whether some of their performances were improvised, he then looks at the involvement of either apprentices or specialist shamanic assistants. Exploring the role of the audience, he then rounds off the chapter by looking at the alleged superhuman feats that shamans could perform – such as levitation and acts of extreme self-harm – and while explaining that some of these can be shown to be illusions, in the case of others, he remarks that the explanation remains a "disturbingly open question." In the final chapter of Part Two, "Knots and Loose Ends", Hutton explores a variety of different elements to shamanism in Siberia. Discussing the role of payment, he highlights that in some areas, shamans were always paid for their services, but that in others it was customary for them to give their aid for free; for this reason he considers Siberian shamanism to be "a vocation rather than a profession". Proceeding to discuss the role of entheogens in Siberian shamanism, he supports Eliade's position that they were only rarely used. Highlighting that there is limited evidence for either shamanic beliefs in shape shifting or in spirit tracks in Siberian shamanism, he then moves on to explore concepts of biological sex and gender. Arguing that in recorded contexts, men rather than women were usually dominant within the shamanic vocation, Hutton then explores the existence of transgender or third gender shamans.

=== Part Three: Siberia in the shamanic world ===
"[S]cholars are able to construct hypotheses more or less according to their personal or ideological predispositions, whether these be to think in terms of ethnic, national or supranational identity, pan-human experience or local particularism, archaic survival or historical evolution. In this situation the terms 'shaman', 'shamanism', and 'shamanic' correspond neither to agreed conceptual categories nor to precise intellectual tools so much as to materials upon an artist's palette, with which academics create compositions of emotive and polemical power."

— Ronald Hutton, 2001.

The tenth chapter, "The Discovery of a Shamanic World", deals with the origins of Siberian shamanism, exploring both of the primary theories that have been put forward; that shamanism in Siberia has its origins in prehistory, or that it developed in the Middle Ages as Siberian indigenous religion adopted elements of Buddhism. Although highlighting that both are possible, Hutton maintains that the first is more plausible because of the existence of similar shamanic beliefs in northern Scandinavia, far from Buddhist influence. Exploring the etymology of the word "shaman", he then looks at the different approaches adopted by historians studying Siberian shamanism, beginning with the Marxist approach adopted by Soviet scholars in the 20th century. Moving on to discuss the comparative religious approach taken by Mircea Eliade in his seminal study, Shamanism: Archaic Techniques of Ecstasy, Hutton remains highly critical of Eliade's work, and his theory that shamanism was an early form of global Palaeolithic religion. He finally moves on to examine the work of Ioan Lewis on this issue.

Chapter eleven, "The Discovery of a Shamanic Past", explores scholarly arguments for the existence of shamanism in European prehistory and history, focusing in on such regions as the ancient Near East and ancient Greece, before looking at shamanistic elements in the cave art of the Upper Palaeolithic and the comparisons with South African artworks that have been made by the archaeologist David Lewis-Williams. Exploring potential post-Palaeolithic survivals of shamanism in Europe, he looks at the idea that shamanistic elements can be detected in Neolithic art or in Early Mediaeval Welsh and Irish literature. He then looks at the existence of shamanism among the Saami people of northern Scandinavia. In the latter part of the chapter, Hutton explores the theories that shamanistic elements survived in parts of Southern Europe into the early modern period, looking at the ideas of historians Éva Pócs and Gabór Klaniczay that the Hungarian táltos continued in a shamanic tradition, as well as the ideas of Carlo Ginzburg regarding the Italian benandanti.

In the final chapter, "The Discovery of a Shamanic Future", Hutton reminisces about his own travels in the Soviet Union during the 1980s, noting how most of those he talked to were either reluctant to discuss shamanism or were dismissive of the subject. He contrasts this with the contemporary situation in the Russian Federation, where shamanism is once more being talked about in a positive manner by Siberian Indigenous leaders wishing to reclaim and reassert their cultural and religious heritage. Discussing any possible genuine survivals of shamanism into the 1980s and even into the post-Soviet period, he also looks at the development of the Neoshamanic movement in the western world, and the way in which various Siberians have adopted neoshamanism and claimed it as the genuine continuance of Siberian shamanism.

== Academic reception and recognition ==
=== Academic reviews ===
In his review for the academic Folklore journal, Jonathan Roper of the University of Sheffield noted that the work "could profitably have been twice as long and have provided a more extended treatment of the issues involved" and that it suffered from a lack of images. On the whole however he thought it "certainly [should] be recommended to readers as an important work" on the subject of shamanism, and he hoped that Hutton would "return to treat this fascinating topic in even greater depth in future."

Shamans was also reviewed by Neil L. Inglis in the Journal for the Academic Study of Magic. Inglis proclaimed Hutton's work to be "that special gem", a work that can have a wide appeal despite its specialist nature. Outlining a synopsis of the book, he concludes there is much that we still fail to understand about shamanism.

=== Popular reviews ===
On his website, the book reviewer Anthony Campbell described the book as a "sympathetic" discussion of the topic. Considering Hutton to be "something of a cultural relativist", he highlights his suspicion that Hutton believes the shamanic claim that they have genuine abilities to contact the spirit world.

=== Wider influence ===
Writing in his pioneering study of Norse magical practices, The Viking Way: Religion and War in Late Iron Age Scandinavia (2002), the English archaeologist Neil Price briefly discussed Hutton's Shamans in his own summary of published studies of shamanism. Remarking that the book offered an "excellent study" of Siberian religion, Price however believed that Hutton had been "woefully misinformed about the Scandinavian source material" regarding Seiðr, or Norse magic. He criticised Hutton for treating Norse and Sámi practices as a "seamless continuum", and for incorrectly asserting that Eiríks saga rauða contained the sole reference to a vǫlva within Old Norse literature. Price lamented that on this occasion, Hutton's "usually exemplary scholarship" had been "spread a little thin."

== Sources ==
- Hutton, Ronald (2001). Shamans: Siberian Spirituality and the Western Imagination. London and New York: Hambledon and London. ISBN 9781852953249.
- Price, Neil (2002). The Viking Way: Religion and War in Late Iron Age Scandinavia. Uppsala: Department of Archaeology and Ancient History, Uppsala University. ISBN 91-506-1626-9.
- Inglis, Neil L. (2004). "Review of Shamans". Journal for the Academic Study of Magic. Vol. 2. Oxford: Mandrake. pp. 337–340.
- Roper, Jonathan (2005). "Review of Shamans". Folklore. Vol. 116, no. 1. The Folklore Society. pp. 113–115. JSTOR 30035256.
- Campbell, Anthony (2008). "Review of Shamans". Anthony Campbell's Reviews.
