= Ronald Hutton =

English academic (born 1953)

Ronald Hutton CBE FSA FRHistS FLSW FBA
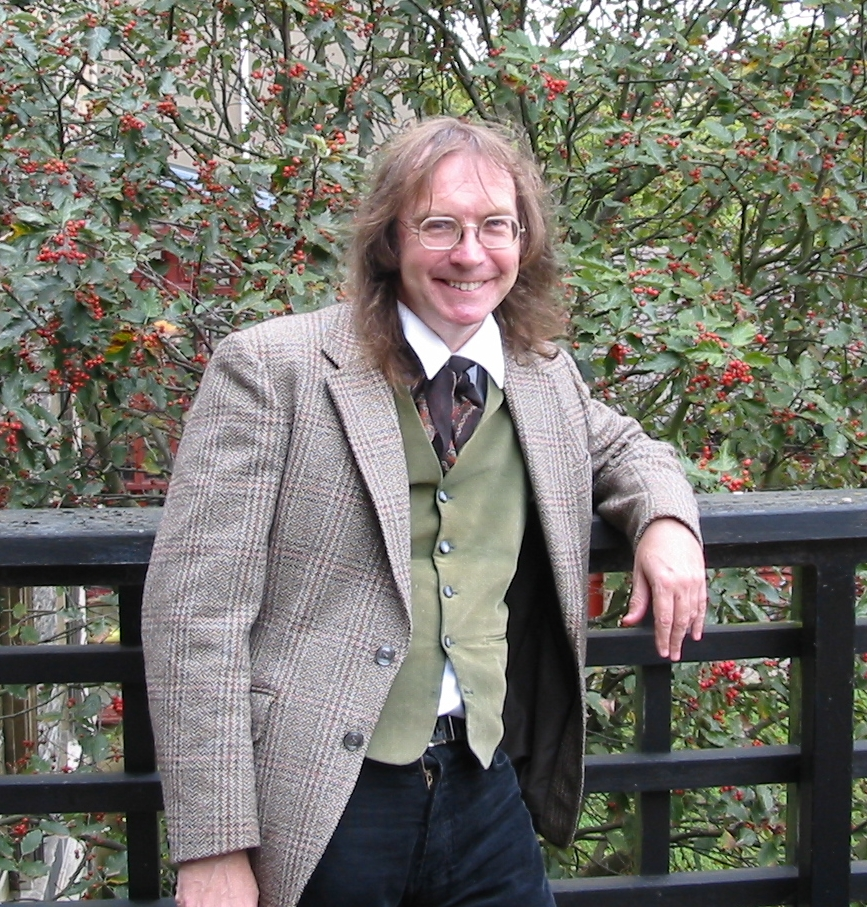
- Hutton in 2002
- Born: Ronald Edmund Hutton; 19 December 1953 (age 72); Ootacamund, India
- Occupations: Historian, author
- Known for: The Pagan Religions of the Ancient British Isles (1991), The Rise and Fall of Merry England (1994), The Stations of the Sun (1996), The Triumph of the Moon (1999), Shamans (2001)
- Title: Professor of History
- Honours: Coote Lake Medal

Academic background
- Education: Pembroke College, Cambridge (BA); Magdalen College, Oxford (DPhil)
- Thesis: The Royalist war effort in Wales and the West Midlands, 1642–1646 (1980)
- Doctoral advisor: Hugh Trevor-Roper

Academic work
- Discipline: History
- Sub-discipline: English folklore, pre-Christian religion, contemporary Paganism
- Institutions: University of Bristol

Ronald Edmund Hutton CBE FSA FRHistS FLSW FBA (born 19 December 1953) is an Indian-born English historian specialising in early modern Britain, British calendar customs, pre-Christian religion, and modern paganism. A professor at the University of Bristol and Gresham College, Hutton has written over a dozen books and often appears on British television and radio.

Born in Ootacamund, India, Hutton returned to England as a child, where he attended school in Ilford. Interested in archaeology, he volunteered on various excavations. He studied history at Pembroke College, Cambridge and then took a DPhil at Magdalen College, Oxford, before securing a position at the University of Bristol in 1981. Specialising in early modern Britain, he wrote four books on the subject: The Royalist War Effort (1981), The Restoration (1985), Charles the Second (1989), and The British Republic (1990). He followed these with three books on Britain's pre-Christian religions and calendar customs: The Pagan Religions of the Ancient British Isles (1991), The Rise and Fall of Merry England (1994), and The Stations of the Sun (1996). These were followed by The Triumph of the Moon (1999), an examination of Wicca's history which would receive praise as a seminal text in Pagan studies.

After Shamans (2001), which considered Western perceptions of Siberian shamanism, Hutton focused on the role of the druids in the British imagination, producing two books, The Druids (2007) and Blood and Mistletoe (2009). Revising his earlier approach to pre-Christian religion with Pagan Britain (2013), he then addressed witchcraft for The Witch (2017) before beginning work on a three-volume biography of Oliver Cromwell (2021–24). In addition to appearing in various television documentaries, he fronted his own series, Professor Hutton's Curiosities, in 2013. After 2009 he also became a commissioner and then a trustee of English Heritage, a chair of the organisation's blue plaque committee, and academic advisor for their development of the Stonehenge visitor centre. In 2022 he became Gresham Professor of Divinity.

Hutton's work has brought recognition from a range of institutions. He was elected a Fellow of the Royal Historical Society, Society of Antiquaries of London, Learned Society of Wales and the British Academy, and was appointed a Commander of the Order of the British Empire (CBE). He has also become a popular figure in the British Pagan community and has received honours from the Order of Bards, Ovates and Druids.

== Biography ==
=== Early life: 1953–1980 ===
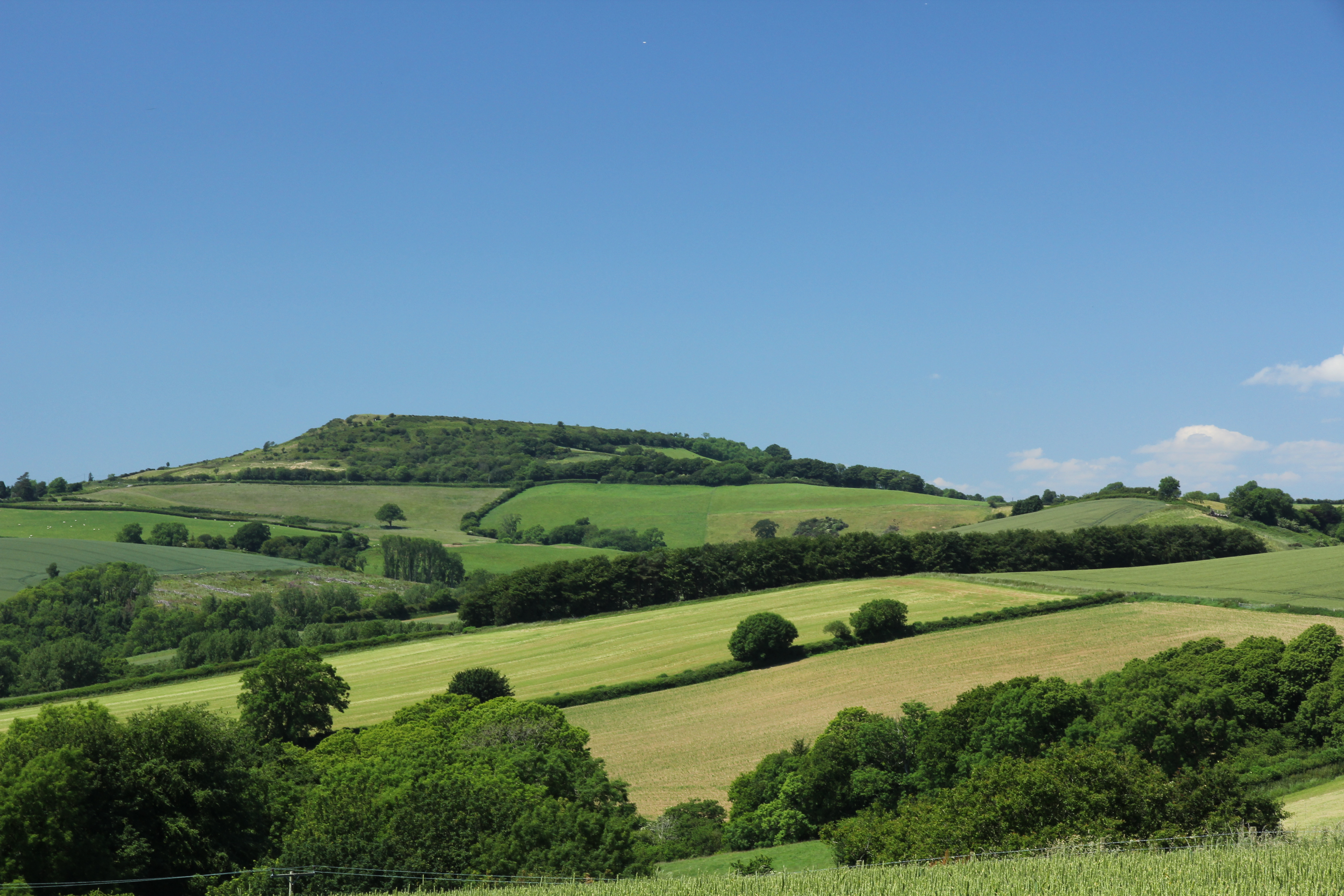
Hutton's interest in archaeology led to his involvement in excavations of Pilsdon Pen (pictured)

Hutton was born on 19 December 1953 in Ootacamund, India. His father was British, his mother Russian. Hutton's father died when Hutton was still an infant, leading his mother to move them to Britain, where they settled into a council flat in eastern England. There, Hutton attended Ilford County High School, further developing his knowledge of history through television documentaries and books from a local library.

Interested in archaeology, Hutton joined the committee of a local archaeological group and from 1965 to 1976 took part in excavations, including at Pilsdon Pen hill fort, Ascott-under-Wychwood long barrow, Hen Domen castle and a temple on Malta. Between 1966 and 1969 he visited every surviving prehistoric chambered tomb in England and Wales, writing a guide to them for himself and his friends. In 1967, he also traveled to Canewdon, Essex to talk with locals who remembered the reputed cunning man George Pickingill.

As a teenager, Hutton was involved with the counterculture of the 1960s and 1970s, attending folk clubs and free festivals. Hutton's mother had been Pagan and in this period he encountered other Pagans, joining Pagan rituals held in Epping Forest between 1968 and 1969. Through this interest, he met Alex Sanders, the head of the Alexandrian Wiccan tradition. He has noted that at the time, he believed in the witch-cult theory that was used by many Wiccans to connect their religion to the pre-Christian past. Supporting that theory, in 1973 he argued for the veracity of Charles Leland's Aradia, or the Gospel of the Witches against the historian Norman Cohn but, as Hutton related, "was floored by him". This encouraged Hutton to later read more of the new research emerging regarding the early modern witch trials. Hutton was also politically active in the anti-racist movement, in 1978 being badly injured by Neo-Nazis for his involvement with the Anti-Nazi League.

Despite his love of archaeology, Hutton decided to study history at university, believing that he had "probably more aptitude" for it. He won a scholarship to study at Pembroke College, Cambridge. There, he continued his interest in archaeology alongside history, in 1975 taking a course run by the university's archaeologist Glyn Daniel, an expert on the Neolithic. While Hutton was a student, his mother died. After completing his undergraduate degree at Cambridge, he moved to the University of Oxford, where he completed his DPhil on the English Civil War at St John's College, Oxford in 1980.

=== Bristol University and first publications: 1981–1990 ===
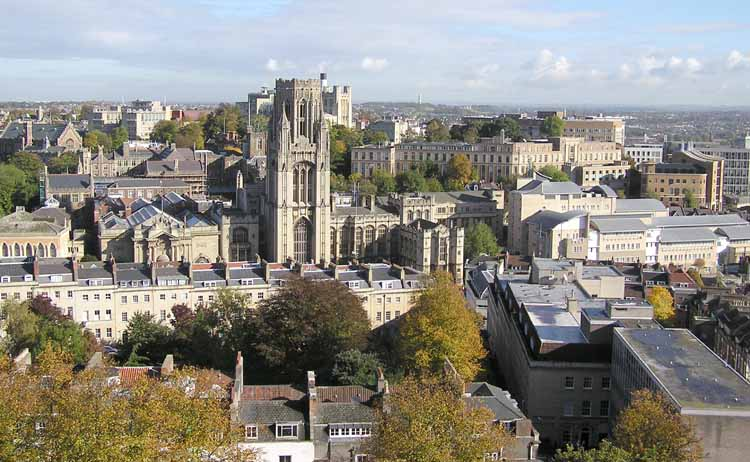
In 1981, Hutton took up a position at Bristol University (pictured)

After a brief fellowship at Magdalen College, Oxford, Hutton secured a job at the University of Bristol in 1981. That year, he published his first book, The Royalist War Effort 1642–1646, which was adapted from his DPhil thesis and focused on how King Charles I raised support from Wales and the West Midlands during the Civil War. It was reviewed by Ian Roy in History Today. Also in 1981, Hutton was elected a Fellow of the Royal Historical Society.

Hutton followed with another book on 17th-century Britain, The Restoration: A Political and Religious History of England and Wales 1658–1667, published in 1985. C. John Somerville reviewed it for the Church History journal, deeming it "a work of great energy in research, sober judgement, and readable presentation." In The Historian, Michael J. Galgano thought Hutton's book "a valuable corrective to the pioneering works" of Godfrey Davies and David Ogg and believed that it would "remain the standard for some time".

In 1988, Bristol University promoted Hutton to the position of reader. The following year he brought out Charles the Second, King of England, Scotland and Ireland. Lois G. Schwoerer reviewed it for The American Historical Review, noting that Hutton was "the first professional historian to write a critical full-length biography of the king" and describing the result as "excellent"; she thought it was "notably readable" and rooted in "exemplary research". In The Historian, Barrett L. Beer commented that Hutton's "scholarship is meticulous" and that he had produced an "evenhanded and convincing" portrayal of Charles II, although cautioned that the book, while clearly written, was too complicated for most undergraduates.

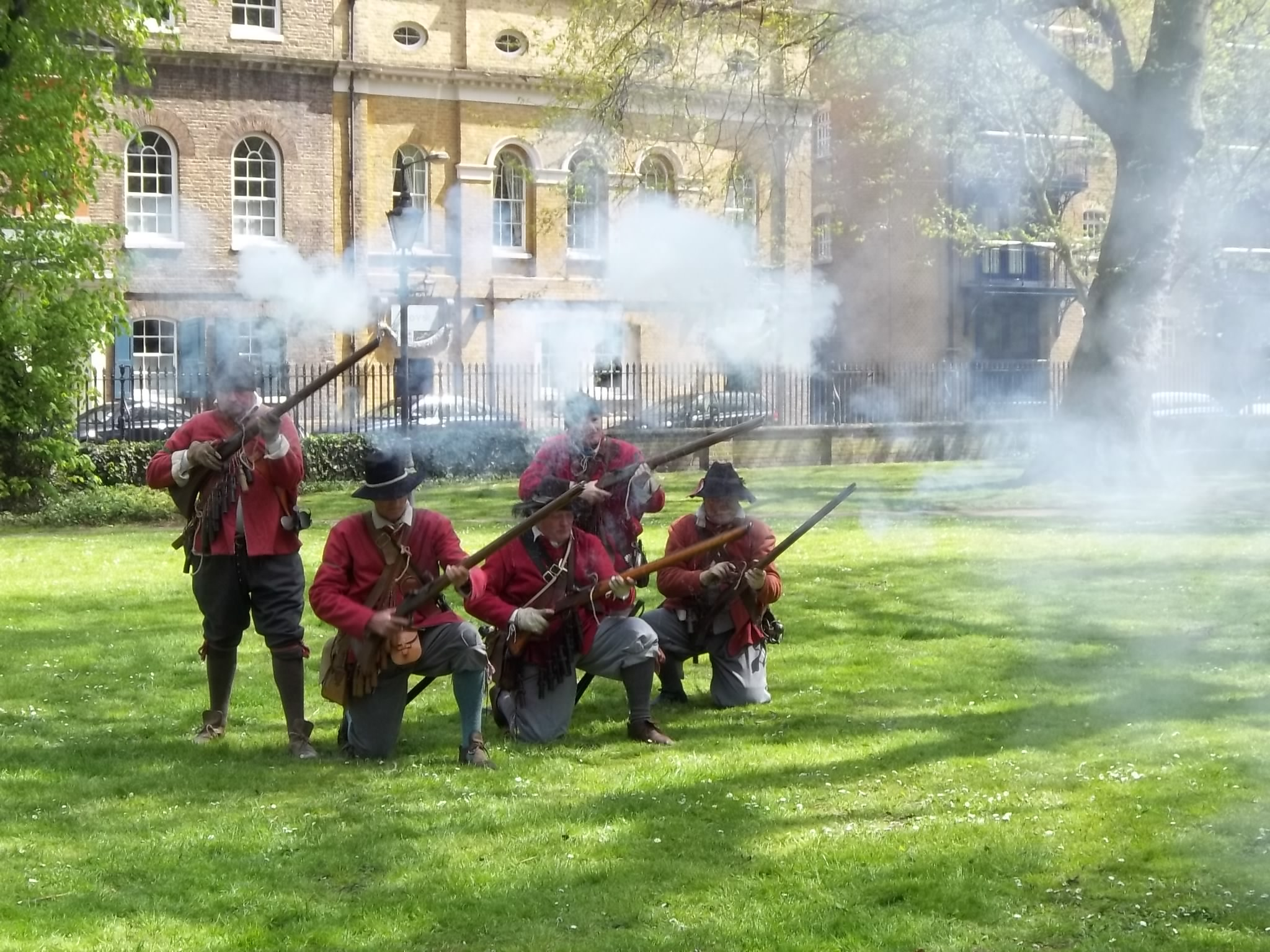
Hutton has had a longstanding involvement with the Sealed Knot (members pictured 2013), an English Civil War reenactment group

Continuing his focus on early modern history, in 1990 Hutton published The British Republic 1649–1660, a short book on the Commonwealth period. In the History journal, historian Ivan Roots characterised the work as being "stuffed with incisive comments, many expressing fresh insights." Glyn Parry, writing in Parergon, praised "Hutton's trademark ability to weave a broad range of recent scholarship into a compelling historical tapestry" but was concerned that many recent academic publications, although utilised, had not been cited directly.

Hutton's interest in early modern Britain extended from his academic research and led to an involvement with The Sealed Knot reenactment group. Interested in public outreach, he also began appearing in the media, initially through local and then national radio and subsequently, from the mid-1980s, through television. Hutton's interest in supernatural beliefs also developed; while traveling in the Soviet Union during the 1980s, he was able to speak with people who had memories of shamanic traditions. In the late 1980s, Hutton began to read up systematically on the history of the early modern witch trials, material he later drew upon in publications during the 2010s.

=== Shift towards pre-Christian religion and calendar customs: 1991–1998 ===
In 1991 The Pagan Religions of the Ancient British Isles rang out like a trumpet. With characteristic modesty, Ronald Hutton has claimed that he simply restated what folklorists had been saying since the 70s, but that is to overlook his power of synthesis. What many had suspected suddenly became evident to all: the old paradigm about the pagan origins of folklore collapsed like a house of cards.

— Folklorist Jeremy Harte, 2025

In 1991, Hutton published The Pagan Religions of the Ancient British Isles, a synthesis of known information about pre-Christian religions in Britain and Ireland. Later scholars noted that the book played an important role in raising public awareness regarding how, since the 1970s, historians and folklorists had grown increasingly sceptical of the idea that recorded folklore from recent centuries represented pre-Christian survivals. The book was well received by archaeologists and in 1994 Hutton was elected a Fellow of the Society of Antiquaries of London.

Hutton's book attracted the interest of many Pagans. On the basis of it, Tim Sebastion, Chief of the Secular Order of Druids, invited Hutton to speak at a conference in Avebury. There, Hutton befriended various Pagan Druids, including Philip Carr-Gomm and Emma Restall Orr. In the 1990s, the Council of British Druid Orders granted Hutton honorary life membership. Hutton was also a friend of the prominent Wiccan Doreen Valiente and was one of the few individuals invited to her funeral in 1999. Certain other Pagans proved more critical of Hutton's book, including Goddess movement feminists Asphodel Long and Max Dashu, who charged Hutton with failing to take into account their movement's beliefs about ancient goddess worship; Hutton later related that Long subsequently "recognised that she had misunderstood me" and the two became friends.

Hutton followed with two books on British calendar customs, both published by Oxford University Press: The Rise and Fall of Merry England: The Ritual Year 1400–1700 (1994) and The Stations of the Sun: A History of the Ritual Year in Britain (1996). In these works he criticised commonly held attitudes, such as the idea of Merry England and the idea that folk customs were static and unchanging over the centuries. These books proved popular among "more intellectual sectors of the Pagan milieu." In 1996, Hutton was also promoted to the rank of professor at Bristol University.

=== The Triumph of the Moon: 1999 ===
In 1990, Hutton had attended a King's College London conference at which prominent British Pagans had acknowledged that Wicca was not the survival of a pre-Christian religion, as earlier generations of Wiccans had commonly claimed. Hutton noted that this encouraged him to research Wicca's "real history". Although aware that addressing Wiccan history could harm his reputation among academic historians, he thought he could take the risk because he had gained tenure at Bristol.

Only an historian[...] as skilled and nuanced as Hutton could have produced the work that both set the facts straight regarding the history of this new religious movement [i.e. Wicca], and gave it a new history. By dismantling, point by point, the sacred history of modern witchcraft and Paganism, he gave them a much more distinguished history, situating them in the tapestry of Western epistemology alongside Romantic poetry, literature, and music, in parallel to the emergent disciplines of anthropology and folklore studies. By doing so, he brought this new religious movement from the margins to the center, showing how the ideas to which it was indebted were key threads in the development of modern Western thought more generally.

— Folklorist Sabina Magliocco, 2022

Hutton's research led to The Triumph of the Moon: A History of Modern Pagan Witchcraft, published by Oxford University Press in 1999. This was the first monograph on Wiccan history to be written by a professional academic. Various colleagues and students made disparaging comments about Hutton because of his research topic and he believed that Triumph caused his career to stall for "nearly ten years". This academic prejudice towards Wicca and other alternative spiritualities was also reported by other scholars studying the subject.

Hutton's book was nevertheless cited as a forerunner of a wider range of academic publications on modern Paganism and Western esotericism that came in the following decade; an academic journal devoted to modern Paganism, The Pomegranate, launched in 2004, while the European Society for the Study of Western Esotericism was established in 2005. Triumph of the Moon became "a classic" among scholars working on Western alternative spiritualities; two edited volumes and a special issue of the journal Magic, Ritual and Witchcraft would later be dedicated to marking its legacy.

The Triumph of the Moon interested many Pagans. The anthropologist Helen Cornish observed British Pagans undergoing a "Huttonisation" in their perception of history during the late 1990s and 2000s. Many took a positive view of the book; some felt that it validated their practice after the collapse of the traditional Wiccan origin myth. Frederic Lamond, a member of Gerald Gardner's original coven, called it as "an authority on the history of Gardnerian Wicca". In 2000, the Order of Bards, Ovates and Druids invited Hutton to give their annual Mount Haemus Lecture and he would repeatedly be invited to speak at the Wiccan-oriented Witchfest. Displeased by Hutton's rejection of the Wiccan origin myth, other Pagan responses were negative. Pagans critical of Hutton's research usually expressed themselves in magazine articles, blogs, and a self-published book, although Hutton also noted that he received many "abusive emails," mostly from American Pagans, in the years following Triumph.

=== Studying shamans, Stuarts, and druids: 2000–2009 ===
Hutton next turned his attention to Siberian shamanism, with Hambledon and London publishing Shamans: Siberian Spirituality in the Western Imagination in 2001, an examination of how Western writers have perceived Siberian religion. Reviewing the book for the Folklore journal, folklorist Jonathan Roper recommended the book but thought it "could profitably have been twice as long".

In 2003, Hambledon & London also published Witches, Druids and King Arthur, a collection of various essays by Hutton, including on topics such as the nature of myth and the pagan themes found within the works of J.R.R. Tolkien and C.S. Lewis. Reviewing it for The Independent, the sociologist of religion David V. Barrett thought that it should "become a staple text on methodological problems not only in history, but in anthropology, sociology and religious studies." In 2004, Palgrave Macmillan published another essay collection by Hutton, Debates in Stuart History. Mark Stoyle, writing in The English Historical Review, called it a "splendid new survey". That year, Hutton also published an article, "Anthropological and Historical Approaches to Witchcraft: Potential for a New Collaboration?" in The Historical Journal. This argued that historians of early modern witch-hunting should consider anthropological comparisons with witch-hunting elsewhere in the world, an argument made just as historians were beginning to consider a re-engagement with anthropology.

Predictably, Hutton finds himself defending his position on two fronts. Neo-pagans, clinging to the notion that their beliefs are part of an ancient nature religion, and radical feminists upholding the idea of a primeval matriarchal society (which Hutton finds "rather delightful"), scorn Hutton's refreshingly cheerful acceptance that there seems little evidence for either of these. And his less unbuttoned colleagues shake their heads at his optimism about Druidry and other 'alternative spiritualities' as valid contemporary religions.

— Gary Lachman, reviewing Hutton's The Druids, 2007

Hutton also focused on changing perceptions of the ancient druids over the course of British history. He decided to write two books on the subject, one aimed at a wider, general audience, and the other at a more academic readership. The first book, The Druids, was published in 2007. In The Independent, writer Gary Lachman called it a "compact and lively account".

Hutton's more in-depth follow-up, Blood and Mistletoe: The History of the Druids in Britain, was published in 2009. In The Independent, Barrett called Blood and Mistletoe more "academic and more than three times the length" of The Druids, although argued that it was still "very readable", even going so far as to call it a "tour de force". Tom Shippey, in the London Review of Books, noted of it: "my only regret is that although it extends to a quarter of a million words, it is not a few score thousand longer." The review by Noel Malcolm in The Daily Telegraph was a little more critical, claiming that whilst Hutton was "non-sensationalist and scrupulously polite" about modern druids, "occasionally, even-handedness tips over towards relativism – as if there are just different ways of looking at reality, each as good as the other. And that cannot be right."

=== Return to pre-Christian religion and witchcraft: 2010–2019 ===
In the early 2010s, Hutton was involved with English Heritage (logo pictured)

Between 2009 and 2013, Hutton served as a commissioner for English Heritage, and in 2015 he became a trustee of the organisation. He also chaired English Heritage's panel for deciding which blue plaques should be erected to mark historically important individuals. Hutton was similarly appointed academic adviser for the construction of English Heritage's new visitor centre at Stonehenge; an activity for which Bristol University awarded him their Vice-Chancellor's Impact Award in 2016.

In 2011, senior British Wiccans invited Hutton to speak at the "Day for Gerald", an event dedicated to Gerald Gardner. Having made regular appearances on historical documentaries—including the likes of Victorian Farm (2009) and Tudor Monastery Farm (2013)—in 2013 Hutton also fronted his own television series, Professor Hutton's Curiosities, in which he visited various unusual museums around Britain. He later appeared in the 2018 BBC mockumentary series Cunk on Britain.

Hutton revised his earlier work on the pre-Christian religions of Britain for his 2013 book, Pagan Britain. In The Guardian, reviewer Graham Robb called it a "dense, erudite work". Hutton then produced an edited volume, Physical Evidence for Ritual Acts, Sorcery and Witchcraft in Christian Britain: A Feeling for Magic, published by Palgrave Macmillan in 2016. A review by Debora Moretti in Magic, Ritual and Witchcraft noted that the volume built on the earlier work of the archaeologist Ralph Merrifield and reflected "a general—if somewhat slow—and welcome change of attitude toward this topic".

In 2017, Hutton brought out The Witch: A History of Fear, from Ancient Times to the Present. He noted that of his various books, this had had the longest gestation, for he had been working towards it for thirty years; he had only been able to concentrate on writing the book in 2012, once other projects had been finished. Writing in Reviews in History, the historian Willem de Blécourt called The Witch "an extremely ambitious, thought-provoking, challenging and inspiring book". In The Guardian, reviewer Kathryn Hughes called The Witch "magisterial"; Robert Carver, writing in The Spectator, complained that Hutton had not given support to the idea of hallucinogens being used in early modern Europe. Reflecting his expertise in this area, in 2019 Hutton was invited to give the keynote speech at a Lancaster University conference on contemporary witch-hunting. Also in 2019, Oxford University Press published a revised edition of Hutton's The Triumph of the Moon.

=== Gresham College and research on Oliver Cromwell: 2020– ===
Hutton is currently working on a multivolume biography of Oliver Cromwell of which the first two volumes have been published, The Making of Oliver Cromwell (2021) and Oliver Cromwell: Commander in Chief (2024).

In 2022 Hutton was appointed Gresham Professor of Divinity at Gresham College, London. That same year, Hutton also published Queens of the Wild: Pagan Goddesses in Christian Europe: An Investigation. Scholar of religion Carole M. Cusack reviewed it for the International Journal for the Study of New Religions, calling it "exciting" and "very accessible". In the Church Times, Katherine Harvey called it "an extremely thought-provoking study".

== Research themes ==
My colleagues would kill me for saying this, but historians are increasingly conscious of the fact that we can't write history. What we can write about is the way in which people see history and think history happens.

— Hutton on history, 2007

The anthropologist and folklorist Sabina Magliocco suggested that, "at the core of all of Hutton's work", lies "a concern with how the nature of reality is culturally and historically constructed". He was part of a wider generation of scholars in the humanities and social sciences who displayed a "revisionist impulse" during the 1970s and 1980s, and who began to question the paradigms and assumptions that had been rooted in 19th and early 20th-century thought.

Hutton's work on Wiccan history during the 1990s has led to comparisons with scholars like Antoine Faivre, Wouter Hanegraaff, and Arthur Versluis, all of whom challenged the earlier academic dismissal of occultism and Western esotericism as subjects unworthy of serious academic study. Hutton has been cited as making an important contribution to Pagan studies, and as making possible further research on modern Paganism by other scholars.

Although a historian, Hutton has engaged with other scholarly disciplines, including archaeology, anthropology, and folklore studies. Magliocco observed that Hutton's understanding of anthropology and folklore was "extraordinary" for a scholar "not trained in either". In her view, his "precise attention to context, to the voices of all the various stakeholders, and to the ways people perform belief" were more typical of an anthropologist or folklorist than a historian.

== Personal life ==
Hutton was married to Lisa Radulovic from August 1988 to March 2003, when they divorced. He is known to the public for his distinctive attire, incorporating decorated waistcoats and cravats.

The folklorist Jeremy Harte spoke of Hutton's "generosity and courtesy," characterising him as "the least combative of academics; a man who prefers to let truth emerge from the judicious assessment of accumulating evidence, like the Recording Angel on a sabbatical." On interviewing Hutton, Gary Lachman observed his "very pragmatic, creative attitude, recognising that factual error can still produce beneficial results", as with how the historical errors of Margaret Murray could still produce Wicca, which Hutton deems a legitimate religion.

Hutton considers his own religious beliefs a private matter. He has stated that "to some extent history occupies the space in my life filled in that of others by religion or spirituality. It defines much of the way I come to terms with the cosmos, and with past, present and future." He was brought up Pagan by his mother; she "was deeply influenced by the Greek and Roman classics, regarded the Olympian deities as the natural divinities of the world, had a sense of a single archaic mother goddess as standing behind them, and felt an immanent divinity in nature." He was personally acquainted with Wiccans from youth, and throughout his career has maintained strong links with British Pagan communities. He has related that he could "never be a Christian" because he finds "its original texts completely unsympathetic and the figure of Jesus deeply unattractive", even as he admires and respects many Christians.

== Reception ==
The historians of religion Ethan Doyle White and Shai Feraro noted that Hutton "remains a well-respected figure among the scholarly community due to his prodigious output and his friendly and helpful demeanour". Similarly, the historians Laurel Zwissler and Michael Ostling observed that he was "widely appreciated not only for his many historical contributions, but for his active generosity and openness to multiple viewpoints." Hutton was elected a Fellow of the Royal Historical Society in 1981, a Fellow of the Society of Antiquaries of London in 1994, a Fellow of the Learned Society of Wales in 2011, and then a Fellow of the British Academy in 2013. In the 2024 New Year Honours, Hutton was appointed Commander of the Order of the British Empire (CBE) for services to history. That year, Britain's Folklore Society awarded him its Coote Lake Medal for his contribution to folklore scholarship.

Magliocco called Hutton a "consummate storyteller, weaving together narratives with a combination of incisive intellect, empathy for his subjects, and a profoundly human voice". One assessment noted that, as "a great synthesizer and popularizer of historical scholarship, in particular with regard to British folklore and pre-Christian religion, Hutton gained a substantial readership and thus raised awareness of new developments previously restricted to comparatively small scholarly circles."

Hutton is also a public intellectual. His documentary appearances resulted in him becoming "an oft-recognised face on British television" and contributed to him building "a cult fan following". Hutton's fans established a Facebook appreciation page, which by 2019 had over a thousand members.

=== In Paganism and alternative spiritual movements ===
Hutton has become a "well-known and much loved figure" in the British Pagan community. In 2026, the Order of Bards, Ovates, and Druids (OBOD) bestowed on Hutton the status of Ollamh and appointed him the recipient of its first Fellowship. OBOD described Hutton as being "rigorous without cynicism, critical without hostility, and deeply humane throughout". Marking the award, Pagan news website The Wild Hunt praised Hutton as someone who, "through decades of scholarship, teaching, and community engagement,[...] has helped foster a productive dialogue between academic research and lived spiritual practice."

More negative Pagan views of Hutton have tended to be voiced not in Britain, but in the United States, Canada, Australia, and New Zealand. This hostility has largely stemmed from what some Wiccans regard as Hutton's role in undermining "their traditional origin myths"; although many historians working on early modern witchcraft since the 1960s have rejected Murray's theories, this Pagan criticism has centred on Hutton specifically, potentially because he is one of the only professional historians to directly address Wiccan history. Pagan critics of Hutton have been described as often appearing "emotionally charged and sometimes obsessive". Hutton has noted that he has received abuse from some Pagans, usually by email, while archaeologist and Pagan studies scholar Caroline Tully suggested that Hutton's Pagan critics had launched "an internet smear campaign" against him.

== Bibliography ==
Title	Year	Publisher	ISBN
The Royalist War Effort 1642–1646	1982	Routledge (London)	
The Restoration: A Political and Religious History of England and Wales 1658–1667	1985	Clarendon	0-19-822698-5
Charles the Second, King of England, Scotland and Ireland	1989	Clarendon	0-19-822911-9
The British Republic 1649–1660	1990	Palgrave Macmillan	
The Pagan Religions of the Ancient British Isles: Their Nature and Legacy	1991	Blackwell (Oxford and Cambridge)	0-631-18946-7
The Rise and Fall of Merry England: The Ritual Year 1400–1700	1994	Oxford University Press (Oxford and New York)	9 780198-203636
The Stations of the Sun: A History of the Ritual Year in Britain	1996	Oxford University Press (Oxford and New York)	
The Triumph of the Moon: A History of Modern Pagan Witchcraft	1999	Oxford University Press (Oxford and New York)	9 780198 207443
Shamans: Siberian Spirituality and the Western Imagination	2001	Hambledon and London (London and New York)	1-85295-324-7
Witches, Druids and King Arthur	2003	Hambledon	
Debates in Stuart History	2004	Palgrave Macmillan	
The Druids: A History	2007	Hambledon Continuum	
Blood and Mistletoe: The History of the Druids in Britain	2009	Yale University Press (London)	978-0-300-14485-7
A Brief History of Britain 1485–1660: The Tudor and Stuart Dynasties	2011	Robinson	978-1845297046
Pagan Britain	2013	Oxford University Press	978-0300197716
Physical Evidence for Ritual Acts, Sorcery and Witchcraft in Christian Britain: A Feeling for Magic (edited volume)	2015	Palgrave Macmillan	
The Witch: A History of Fear, from Ancient Times to the Present	2017	Yale University Press	978-0300229042
The Triumph of the Moon: A History of Modern Pagan Witchcraft (revised edition)	2019	Oxford University Press	
The Making of Oliver Cromwell	2021	Yale University Press	978-0300257458
Queens of the Wild: Pagan Goddesses in Christian Europe: An Investigation	2022	Yale University Press	978-0300261011
Oliver Cromwell: Commander in Chief	2024	Yale University Press	978-0300278941
