= Jeremy Harte =

English folklorist

Jeremy Harte is an English folklorist and museum curator. He worked for many years as curator of Bourne Hall Museum in Ewell, Surrey and is the author of over ten books on British folklore and history. Harte's scholarly interests have focused in particular on "sacred space and tales of encounters with the supernatural."

== Biography ==
=== Early life and career ===
Harte grew up near Abbotsbury in Dorset. He studied at Cambridge University and then worked in the archaeological section of the Dorset County Museum in Dorchester. In Dorset, Harte was involved in the Earth mysteries movement and edited the magazine Wessex Earth Mysteries.

Building on an essay that won the Mansell-Pleydell Prose Essay for 1984, Harte produced Cuckoo Pounds and Singing Barrows: The Folklore of Ancient Sites in Dorset, which was published by the Dorset Natural History and Archaeological Society in 1986. It was reviewed in the Folklore journal by Malcolm Jones, who thought it "packed with interest" but complained about the poor quality of the published book, which included a page missing and badly reproduced images.

=== Bourne Hall Museum ===
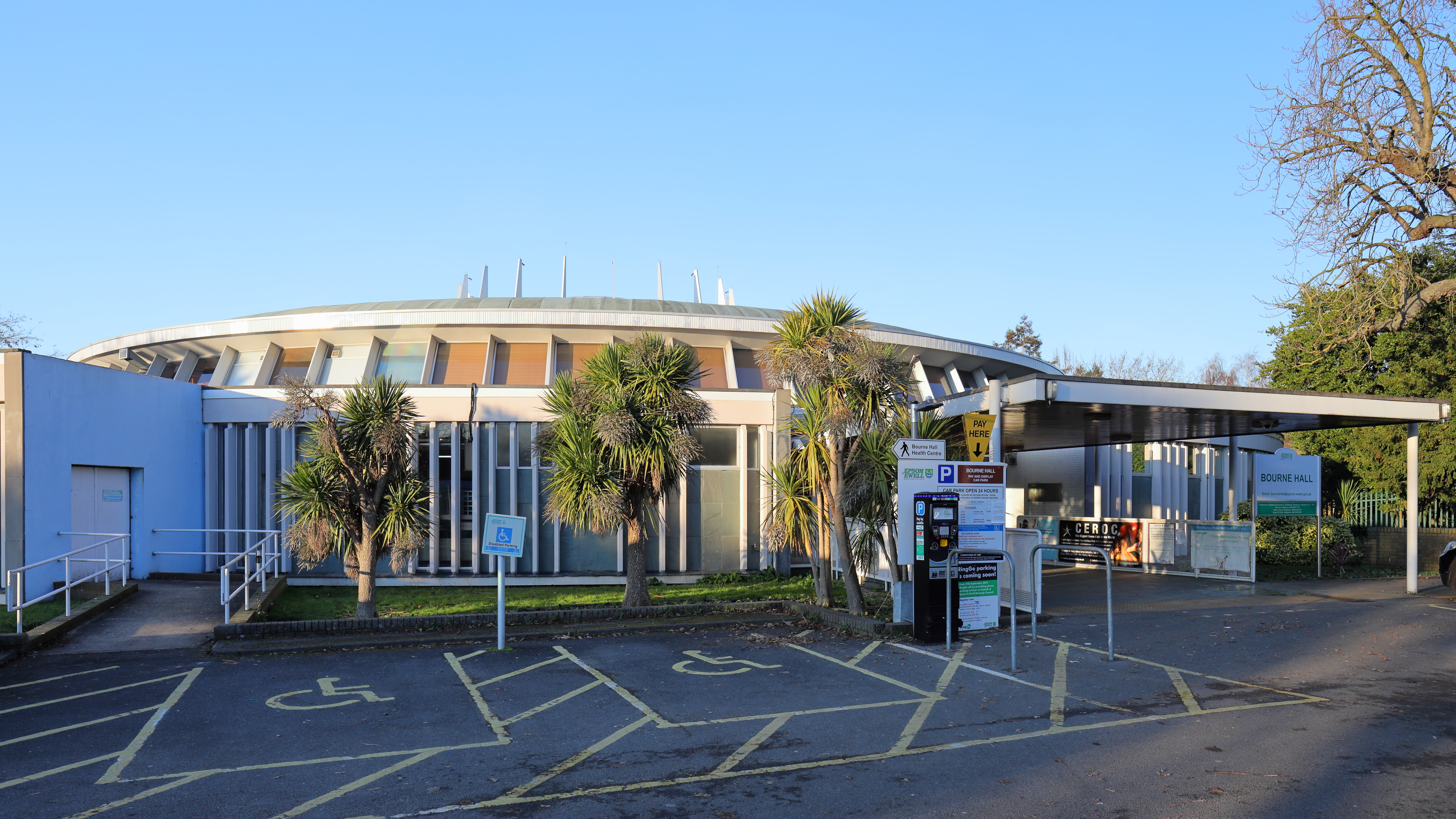
Harte worked at Bourne Hall Museum in Ewell (pictured) for over 25 years

In 1989, Harte began work at Bourne Hall Museum in Ewell, Surrey, and remained there for 35 years, retiring in 2025. He also involved himself in other organisations, including the Folklore Society. By 2024, Harte was considered "a familiar name to aficionados of British folklore." At a London ceremony in 2024, Harte was the Folklore Society representative who formally awarded the Society's Coote Lake Medal to the historian Ronald Hutton for the latter's contributions to folklore scholarship.

Although not a Traveller himself, Harte has served as the secretary of the Romany and Traveller Family History Society and has been described as an advocate for Travelling communities. For several years he was the book review editor of the scholarly journal Time and Mind: The Journal of Archaeology, Consciousness and Culture.

==== Publications ====
Harte's book on British fairy lore, Explore Fairy Traditions, won the Folklore Society's annual Katharine Briggs Award in 2005. In their report, the award's judges stated that the book "reflects good modern research, is well referenced, and opens up many interesting lines of thought," in addition to being "written in a clear, lively style". Reviewing the book in the journal Fabula, the folklorist Willhelm F. H. Nicolaisen thought that Harte's victory would have pleased the folklorist Katharine Briggs, after whom the award is named, because of her own interest in fairy lore. Nicolaisen assessed Harte's book to be a "well-informed, well-researched, and nicely balanced account", although also noted it was "a very British, in places even very English, book" which did not examine material from elsewhere in Europe. Historian Ethan Doyle White stated that Explore Folk Traditions "quickly became a classic" in the field.

Harte's 2008 book English Holy Wells, again published by Heart of Albion, was reviewed by the historian Bruce Osborne in the journal Time and Mind. Osborne considered it "an essential reference guide for all serious enthusiasts of holy wells", believing that it would be useful to local historians researching the wells in their area.

In 2023, Reaktion published Harte's Cloven Country: The Devil and the English Landscape. The historian Aaron John Henry Larsen reviewed it for the Magic, Ritual, and Witchcraft journal, calling it "an essential compilation of these diabolical stories[...] written in a style that will delight both the seasoned scholar and amateur folklorist alike." In the Folklore journal, it was reviewed by Doyle White, who noted that Cloven Country was "learned yet entertaining, suffused with a distinctive humour that very few other writers can successfully pull off". In the Journal of British Studies, the folklorist Ceri Houlbrook similarly described it as having been written in Harte's "characteristically eloquent, erudite, and often humorous style". The historian Francis Young produced a review for the Agricultural History Review. Reviewing it for The Guardian, the writer P. D. Smith stated that Harte takes the "reader on a devilishly entertaining tour of England and its richly storied landscape."

The same year, Reaktion also published Harte's Travellers Through Time: A Gypsy History. The historian David Cressy reviewed it for the Journal of British Studies, comparing it to earlier writings on Travellers by George Borrow and Charles Godfrey Leland, and suggesting that its approach was "romantic and eclectic rather than analytic or systematic".

The University of Exeter Press brought out Harte's Fairy Encounters In Medieval England: Landscape, Folklore and the Supernatural in 2024. Reviewing it for the Folk Life journal, Young characterised it as being, "in a sense, a sequel" to Explore Fairy Traditions and went on to label it "the indispensable reference text on which any future studies of medieval English fairy lore must rest". In Folklore, Doyle White described the book as being "erudite, engaging, and repeatedly funny", a work which "cements [Harte's] status as the great raconteur of British folklore studies".

== Personal life ==
Harte is a Buddhist and has two children.

== Bibliography ==
Title	Year	Publisher
Cuckoo Pounds and Singing Barrows: The Folklore of Ancient Sites in Dorset	1986	Dorset Natural History & Archaeological Society
Legends	1998	Dovecote Press
The Green Man	2001	Batsford
Explore Fairy Traditions	2003	Heart of Albion
English Holy Wells	2008	Heart of Albion
Epsom & Ewell Through Time	2012	Amberley
Epsom & Ewell At Work: People and Industries Through the Years	2017	Amberley
Cloven Country: The Devil and the English Landscape	2023	Reaktion
Travellers Through Time: A Gypsy History	2023	Reaktion
Fairy Encounters In Medieval England: Landscape, Folklore and the Supernatural	2024	University of Exeter Press
Treasures on Earth: Buried Wealth in Landscape and Legend	2026	Reaktion
