= Ralph Merrifield =

British archaeologist and museum custodian

- Photograph of Merrifield
- Born: 22 August 1913; Temple Fortune, London, England
- Died: 9 January 1995 (aged 81); London, England
- Citizenship: United Kingdom
- Education: Varndean College
- Known for: Study and new interpretation of the archaeology of London and the archaeology of ritual and magic.
- Scientific career
- Fields: Archaeology; Curator
- Workplaces: Brighton Museum; Guildhall Museum; Museum of London

Ralph Merrifield (22 August 1913 – 9 January 1995) was an English museum curator and archaeologist. (Note: "[Merrifield] would probably ... be grateful if it were noted that his first name bears the older pronunciation of 'Rafe', and does not rhyme with 'Alf'!") Described as "the father of London's modern archaeology", Merrifield was a specialist in the archaeology of both Roman London and magical practices, publishing six books on these subjects over the course of his life.

Merrifield began his career in 1930 as an assistant at Brighton Museum. In 1935 he gained an external degree in anthropology from the University of London. During the Second World War he served in the Royal Air Force. In 1950 he became assistant keeper of the Guildhall Museum in London. In 1956 he relocated to Accra to oversee the opening of the new National Museum of Ghana, before returning to work at the Guildhall Museum. He produced a synthesis of known material on the archaeology of Roman London, published as The Roman City of London in 1965.

He was appointed senior keeper of the new Museum of London on its establishment in 1976, and soon after was promoted to deputy director. He retired in 1978 but remained active, lecturing, and publishing The Archaeology of Ritual and Magic (1987) and further studies of Roman London. He was a keen supporter of the Standing Conference on London Archaeology, a body designed to monitor the impact that English Heritage was having on the city's archaeology, which he believed to be negative.

== Biography ==
=== Early life: 1913–1949 ===
Merrifield was born on 22 August 1913 in Temple Fortune, a suburb of north-west London that at the time was yet to be fully developed. His parents had married in 1912, and his father, Albert Merrifield, was a railway clerk, whereas his mother, Margaret, had "excellent qualifications and was experienced as a primary school teacher". About a year after his birth the family moved to Southend-on-Sea, Essex, where his father died aged 36 on 6 May 1916: Merrifield was then three months short of his third birthday. His mother then moved with him to Brighton, Sussex, on the south coast of England, where they lived with her parents above a shoe shop run by her father. (Note: "In his introductory essay [for Collectanea Londiniensia: Studies in London Archaeology and History Presented to Ralph Merrifield, published in 1978, W. F.] Grimes wrote that Merrifield was born in Brighton on 22 August 1913, that his father died when he was three years old, and that his career in museums began when he was in the sixth form at Brighton's Varndean Grammar School. When Merrifield died in 1995, the national press included these details in their obituaries for him, and so they became fact by repetition. In reality, of those details only the date of birth is correct.")

Merrifield's education began at Pelham Street Council School in Brighton, where "a report issued on 29 September 1922, when he was nine years old, [used] the phrase 'top boy' twice in connection with his scholarly progress." He undertook his secondary education at the Municipal Secondary School for Boys on York Place in Brighton, and it was while studying there, in 1930, that he became an assistant to H. S. Toms, curator of Brighton Museum and former assistant to the archaeologist Augustus Pitt Rivers. (Note: "[T]he school moved and changed its name to Varndean School for Boys the year after [Merrifield] left it in 1930 ... Merrifield dedicated [The Archaeology of Ritual and Magic] to Toms, as his 'first mentor in archaeology and folk studies'.") Inspired by the museum's ethnographic collection, which he helped catalogue, Merrifield embarked on a University of London external degree, which he completed in 1935; although its main focus was on anthropology, taking the degree also allowed him to take an intermediate course in botany. It was at this time that he developed a keen interest in the archaeological evidence for religion and magical practices.

In 1940, during the Second World War, Merrifield was conscripted into the Royal Air Force, and in 1943 was transferred to its intelligence division, specialising in the interpretation of aerial photographs. He was posted to India and then Java. In 1945, after the conflict ended, he returned to work at Brighton Museum.

=== The Guildhall Museum and the National Museum of Ghana: 1950–1974 ===
In 1950 Merrifield took a post as assistant keeper of the Guildhall Museum in London, a job that he would retain until 1975. At the time the museum lacked premises, and Merrifield assisted its keeper, Norman Cook, in establishing an exhibit at the Royal Exchange in 1954. During these post-war years the city's archaeological community was largely preoccupied with salvaging Roman and medieval structures damaged in the Blitz, and by subsequent urban redevelopment.

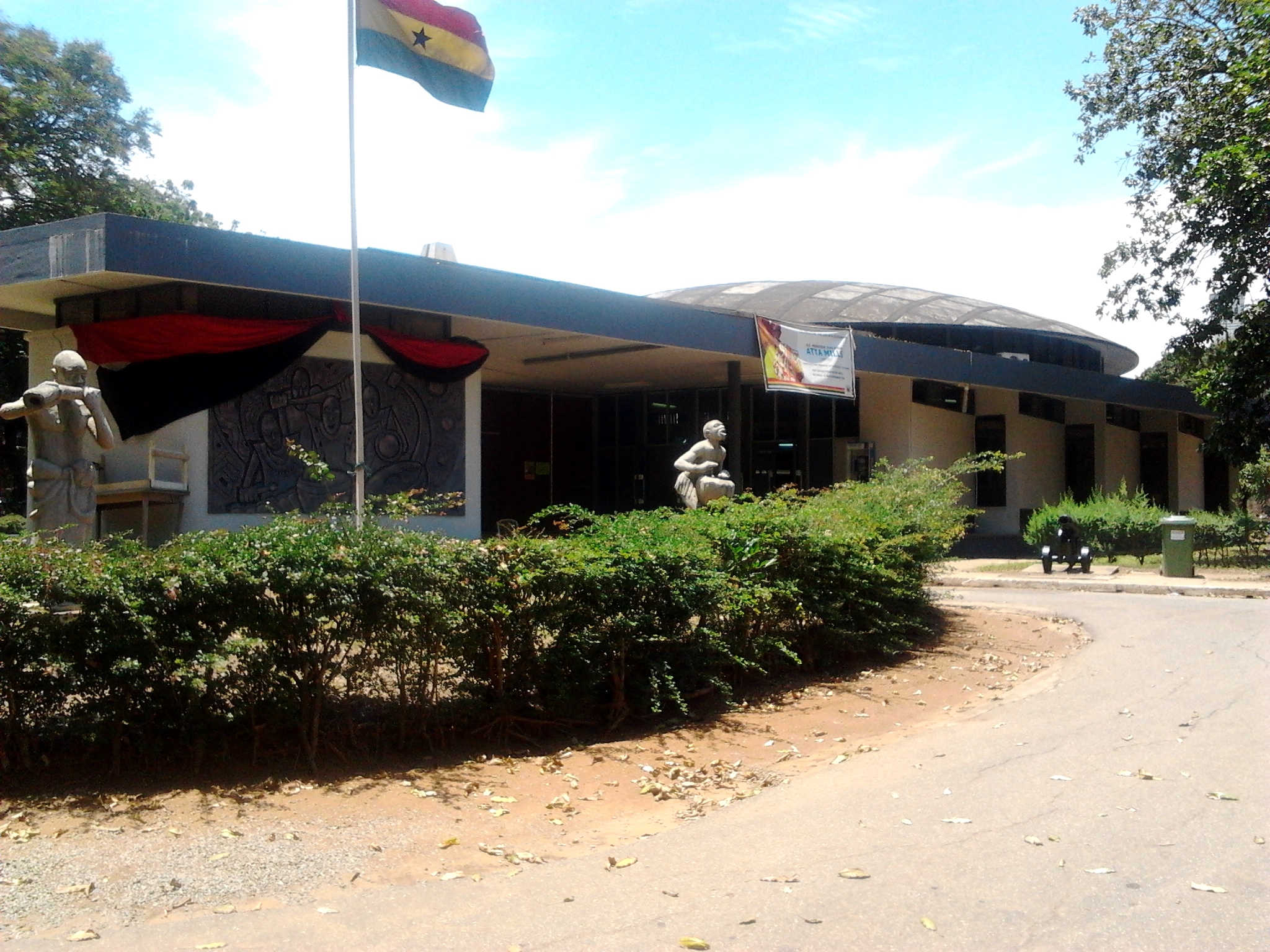
The National Museum of Ghana

In November 1956 Merrifield was sent to Accra in Ghana to establish the National Museum of Ghana. The museum was due to be completed in time for the day of Ghana's independence from Britain in April 1957, displaying exhibits that had previously been at the University Museum of Ghana. Upon arrival Merrifield found that construction was delayed, but, "by an ingenious co-ordination of processes", he had the museum ready for its official opening by the Duchess of Kent. (Note: "Merrifield vividly remembered the museum's first security guards, one armed with a sword and the other with a bow and arrows.") Returning to the Guildhall Museum he campaigned for the archaeological excavation of sites prior to their redevelopment, resulting in the establishment of the museum's Department of Urban Archaeology in 1973.

In 1962 he published his first important academic paper, a study of Roman coins found at the bottom of the River Walbrook. Although not a specialist in any one particular aspect of Romano-British archaeology, he was able to synthesise a wide range of evidence to develop a picture of life in Londinium, the Roman settlement located in the City of London, publishing The Roman City of London in 1965. The project had been suggested to him two years previously by the publisher Ernest Benn, and represented the first detailed study of Roman London to be published for 35 years. To produce it, Merrifield catalogued all known Romano-British remains in the city; at the same time he developed ideas for where further remains might be located. The archaeologist W. F. Grimes described it as "a landmark in the study of Roman London", and the archaeologist Harvey Sheldon called it "a masterful historical synthesis". The book established Merrifield's reputation to a wider audience. He followed this with two works aimed at a general audience, Roman London (1969), in which he looked at evidence for Romano-British occupation across the wider Greater London area, and The Archaeology of London (1975), in which he surveyed the archaeological evidence of the region from the Palaeolithic through to the Early Middle Ages.

=== Museum of London and retirement: 1975–1995 ===
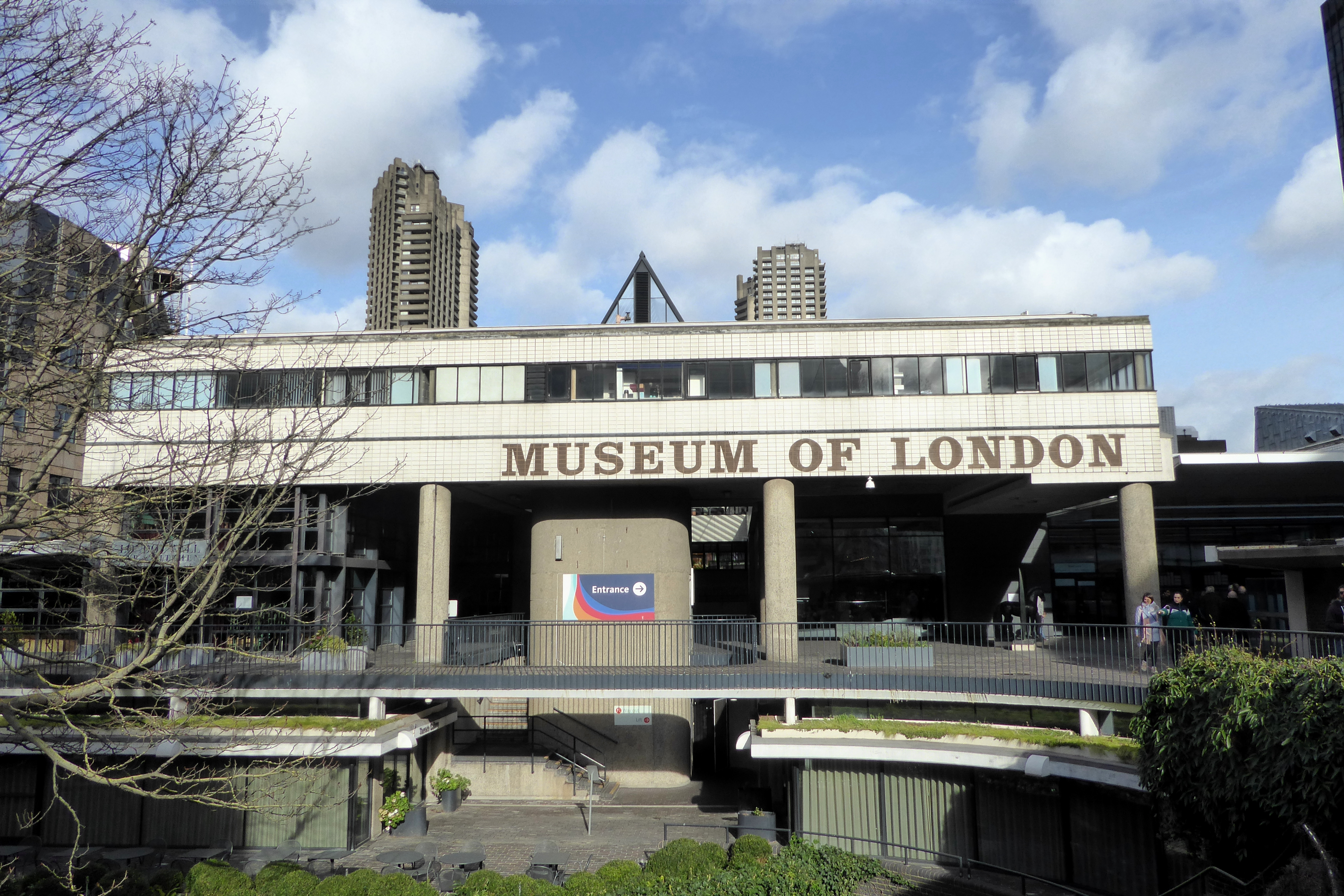
Merrifield helped establish the Museum of London

In 1975 the Guildhall Museum was amalgamated with the London Museum to become the Museum of London, and Merrifield became its senior keeper: he was promoted to the position of deputy director in 1977, and was responsible for designing the museum's first Roman gallery. From 1976 to 1978 he also served as president of the London and Middlesex Archaeological Society. Merrifield retired in 1978, and a festschrift, entitled Collectanea Londiniensia: Studies in London Archaeology and History Presented to Ralph Merrifield, was published in his honour. Recognising his many years of service to the archaeological field, the University of London awarded him an honorary doctorate.

During his retirement he continued to take an active role in researching London's past. In 1983 he published London: City of the Romans, in which he updated his account of Londinium with information obtained over the previous decade and a half. His book The Archaeology of Ritual and Magic appeared in 1987, and was written to combat what Merrifield identified as a widespread neglect of ritual aspects in the archaeological record. (Note: "[H]is wife Lysbeth ... typed [the book] from manuscript – she also arranged the notes and bibliography and compiled the index.") Concurring with Merrifield's assessment about this neglect, the later archaeologist Roberta Gilchrist described the book as a "rare contribution" to the discipline. The historian of religion Hilda Ellis Davidson praised the "cautious and balanced arguments" of Merrifield's work, opining that it should be read by every archaeologist as a corrective to what she thought was their widespread ignorance of folklore.

Merrifield was uneasy with the changes made to London's archaeological establishment by English Heritage during the early 1990s, strongly supporting the creation of the Standing Conference on London Archaeology to monitor English Heritage's actions. He also continued to talk on archaeological subjects, and his final lecture, "Magic Protection of the Home", was given to extramural students in Northampton in December 1994.

== Personal life and death ==
Merrifield married Lysbeth Webb, a colleague at the Guildhall Museum, in 1951. The couple went on to have a daughter and a son. Their son, Mike Merrifield, an emeritus professor of astronomy at the University of Nottingham, has featured frequently in popular YouTube channels Sixty Symbols and Deep Sky Videos.

Following a short illness, Merrifield died of cardiac arrest in King's College Hospital, London, on 9 January 1995, leaving behind his wife, children, and grandchildren.

== Legacy ==
Merrifield came to be known as the "father of London's modern archaeology", the archaeologist Harvey Sheldon describing him as the "father figure" of London archaeology. According to archaeologist W. F. Grimes, it was Merrifield's "work in and about London [that earned him] an honoured place in British Archaeology". In Ronald Hutton's introduction for Physical Evidence for Ritual Acts, Sorcery and Witchcraft in Christian Britain, edited by him and published in 2016, he referenced a work from 2012 by Roberta Gilchrist, who noted then "a stubborn reluctance to address [the] phenomenon [of ritual and magic] in relation to later medieval archaeology". Hutton noted further that, "when a top-ranking scholar like Gilchrist expresses concern about an issue, that is a sign in itself that it is emerging into greater prominence." In 2014, the Society for Historical Archaeology's journal Historical Archaeology published an issue mainly comprising papers presented to a symposium held in 2012 in Baltimore, Maryland, USA, on the topic "Manifestations of magic: The archaeology and material culture of folk religion". In an introductory paper a guest editor, M. Chris Manning, described The Archaeology of Ritual and Magic as "seminal", and wrote that "[m]any of the participants' ... research [had] been informed by Merrifield's work". However, the "volume edited by ... Hutton [in 2016] was the first [book] to cover similar ground in twenty-eight years."

In Merrifield's obituary in British Archaeology magazine, Max Hebditch, director of the Museum of London, described him as being both "generous with his knowledge and friendship" and "energetic and active to the end". Sheldon stated that he was "universally loved and admired, [having done] more than anyone else, both by example and influence," to place London's archaeology on a firm footing. Writing in The Independent, Peter Marsden commented on Merrifield's "quiet manner [that] obscured a steely determination" to advance scholarship.

In August 2025, an asteroid was named in Merrifield's honour (50427 Ralphmerrifield) by the International Astronomical Union, referencing his "significant contributions to the study of Roman London and the role of ritual and magic in archaeology"; This bulletin also named an asteroid for his son, Mike Merrifield.

== Works ==
A list of Merrifield's published work, including books, articles, and book reviews, was compiled by John Hopkins and Jenny Hall and included as part of his 1978 festschrift.

Books
Year of publication	Title	Publisher
1965	The Roman City of London	Benn (London)
1969	Roman London	Frederick A. Praeger (New York)
1973	A Handbook to Roman London	Guildhall (London)
1975	The Archaeology of London	Greenwood Press (Santa Barbara)
1983	London: City of the Romans	B. T. Batsford (London)
1987	The Archaeology of Ritual and Magic	B. T. Batsford (London)
