= Beyond the Witch Trials =

2004 book edited by Owen Davies and Willem de Blécourt

Beyond the Witch Trials: Witchcraft and Magic in Enlightenment Europe
- The first edition cover
- Author: Owen Davies and Willem de Blécourt (editors)
- Language: English
- Subject: history of magic
- Publisher: Manchester University Press
- Publication date: 2004
- Publication place: United Kingdom
- Media type: Print (Hardcover)
- Pages: 211
- ISBN: 978-0719066603

Beyond the Witch Trials: Witchcraft and Magic in Enlightenment Europe is an edited volume edited by the historians Owen Davies and Willem de Blécourt. It was first published by Manchester University Press in 2004. It consists of ten essays on the continued practice of magic and the belief in witchcraft in Europe during the European Enlightenment after the end of the witch trials in the early modern period. It was accompanied by Witchcraft Continued: Popular Magic in Modern Europe, dealing with the nineteenth and twentieth centuries, also published by Manchester University Press in 2004.

== Contents ==
- Davies and De Blécourt's "Introduction"
- Toivo's "Making (dis)order: witchcraft and the symbolics of hierarchy in late seventeenth- and early eighteenth-century Finland
- Ferraiuolo's "Pro exoneratione sua propria conscientia: magic, witchcraft and Church in early eighteenth-century Capua"
- Tausiet's "From illusion to disenchantment: Feijoo versus the 'falsely possessed' in eighteenth-century Spain"
- Lennersand and Oja's "Responses to witchcraft in late-seventeenth- and eighteenth-century Sweden"
- Maxwell-Stuart's "Witchcraft and magic in eighteenth-century Scotland"
- Olli's "The Devil's pact: a male strategy"
- Barry's "Public infidelity and private belief? The discourse of spirits in Enlightenment Bristol"
- De Blécourt's "Evil people: a late eighteenth-century Dutch witch doctor and his clients"
- Hoggard's "The archaeology of counter-witchcraft and popular magic"
- Doering-Manteuffel and Bachter's "The dissemination of magical knowledge in Enlightenment Germany"
