= Willem de Blécourt =

Historical anthropologist from Netherlands

Willem de Blécourt (full name: Wilhelmus Jacobus Christiaan de Blécourt) (born 29 December 1951) is a Dutch historical anthropologist specialising in the study of witchcraft and folk magic in Europe from the Late Middle Ages to the 20th century. An Honorary Research Fellow at both the Huizinga Institute and the Meertens Institute, Amsterdam, de Blécourt is also a prolific author, having edited several books on the subject. As of 2024, Willem has transitioned and is now known as Yseult de Blécourt (full name: Monique Alwyne Yseult de Blécourt).

== Bibliography ==
=== Monographs ===
| Title | Year | Publisher | ISBN |
|---|---|---|---|
| Termen van toverij. De veranderende betekenis van toverij in Noordoost-Nederland tussen de 16de en 20ste eeuw | 1990 | SUN | 90-6168-321-1 |
| Het Amazonenleger. Irreguliere genezeressen in Nederland, 1850-1930 | 1999 | Amsterdam University Press | 90-5356-394-6 |
| Tales of Magic, Tales in Print. On the Genealogy of Fairy Tales and the Brothers Grimm | 2012 | Manchester University Press | 978-0-7190-83792 |

=== Edited volumes ===
| Title | Year | Publisher | ISBN |
|---|---|---|---|
| Cultural Approaches to the History of Medicine: Mediating Medicine in Early Modern and Modern Europe | 2004 | Palgrave Macmillan | 978-1-4039-1569-6 |
| Beyond the Witch Trials: Witchcraft and Magic in Enlightenment Europe | 2004 | Manchester University Press | 978-0-7190-6660-3 |
| Witchcraft Continued: Popular Magic in Modern Europe | 2004 | Manchester University Press | 978-0-7190-6658-0 |
| Sisters of Subversion: Histories of Women, Tales of Gender | 2008 | AMB Press | 978-90-79700-011 |
| Werewolf Histories | 2015 | Palgrave Macmillan | 978-1-137-52633-5 |
