= Magic and religion =

People who believe in magic can be found in all societies, regardless of whether they have organized religious hierarchies, including formal clergy, or more informal systems. Such concepts tend to appear more frequently in cultures based in polytheism, animism, or shamanism. Religion and magic became conceptually separated in the West where the distinction arose between supernatural events sanctioned by approved religious doctrine versus magic rooted in other religious sources. With the rise of Christianity this became characterised with the contrast between divine miracles versus folk religion, superstition, or occult speculation.

== Distinction ==
Early sociological interpretations of magic by Marcel Mauss and Henri Hubert emphasized the social conditions in which the phenomenon of magic develops. According to them, religion is the expression of a social structure and serves to maintain the cohesion of a community (religion is therefore public) and magic is an individualistic action (and therefore private).

Ralph Merrifield, the British archaeologist credited as producing the first full-length volume dedicated to a material approach to magic, defined the differences between religion and magic: "'Religion' is used to indicate the belief in supernatural or spiritual beings; 'magic', the use of practices intended to bring occult forces under control and so to influence events; 'ritual', prescribed or customary behaviour that may be religious, if it is intended to placate or win favour of supernatural beings, magical if it is intended to operate through impersonal forces of sympathy or by controlling supernatural beings, or social if its purpose is to reinforce a social organisation or facilitate social intercourse".

In 1991, H. S. Versnel argued that magic and religion function in different ways and that these can be broadly defined in four areas: Intention – magic is employed to achieve clear and immediate goals for an individual, whereas religion is less purpose-motivated and has its sights set on longer-term goals; Attitude – magic is manipulative as the process is in the hands of the user, "instrumental coercive manipulation", opposed to the religious attitude of "personal and supplicative negotiation"; Action – magic is a technical exercise that often requires professional skills to fulfil an action, whereas religion is not dependent upon these factors but the will and sentiment of the gods; Social – the goals of magic run counter to the interests of a society (in that personal gain for an individual gives them an unfair advantage over peers), whereas religion has more benevolent and positive social functions.

== Connection ==
This separation of the terms 'religion' and 'magic' in a functional sense is disputed. It has been argued that abandoning the term magic in favour of discussing "belief in spiritual beings" will help to create a more meaningful understanding of all associated ritual practices. However using the word 'magic' alongside 'religion' is one method of trying to understand the supernatural world, even if some other term can eventually take its place.

It is a postulate of modern anthropology, at least since early 1930s, that there is complete continuity between magic and religion.

Robert Ranulph Marett (1932) said:

Many leading anthropologists, including the author of The Golden Bough, would wholly or in the main refuse the title of religion to these almost inarticulate ceremonies of very humble folk. I am afraid, however, that I cannot follow them. [...] They are mysteries, and are therefore at least generically akin to religion. Moreover, they are held in the highest public esteem as of infinite worth whether in themselves or for their effects. To label them, then, with the opprobrious name of magic as if they were on a par with the mummeries that enable certain knaves to batten on the nerves of fools is quite unscientific; for it mixes up two things which the student of human culture must keep rigidly apart, namely, a normal development of the social life and one of its morbid by-products. Hence for me they belong to religion, but of course to rudimentary religion—to an early phase of the same world-wide institution that we know by that name among ourselves. I am bound to postulate the strictest continuity between these stages of what I have here undertaken to interpret as a natural growth.

Ernst Cassirer (1944) wrote:

It seems to be one of the postulates of modern anthropology that there is complete continuity between magic and religion. [note 35: See, for instance, RR Marett, Faith, Hope, and Charity in Primitive Religion, the Gifford Lectures (Macmillan, 1932), Lecture II, pp. 21 ff.] ... We have no empirical evidence at all that there ever was an age of magic that has been followed and superseded by an age of religion.

In ancient Egypt, the religion held that the gods' actions maintained maat and created and sustained all living things. They did this work using a force the Egyptians called heka, a term usually translated as "magic". Heka was a fundamental power that the creator god used to form the world and the gods themselves. Magic (personified as the god heka) was an integral part of religion and culture which is known to us through a substantial corpus of texts which are products of the Egyptian tradition. While the category magic has been contentious for modern Egyptology, there is clear support for its applicability from ancient terminology. The Coptic term hik is the descendant of the pharaonic term heka, which, unlike its Coptic counterpart, had no connotation of impiety or illegality, and is attested from the Old Kingdom through to the Roman era. Heka was considered morally neutral and was applied to the practices and beliefs of both foreigners and Egyptians alike. The Instructions for Merikare informs us that heka was a beneficence gifted by the creator to humanity "... in order to be weapons to ward off the blow of events". Magic was practiced by both the literate priestly hierarchy and by illiterate farmers and herdsmen, and the principle of heka underlay all ritual activity, both in the temples and in private settings.

The English word magic has its origins in ancient Greece. During the late sixth and early fifth centuries BCE, the Persian maguš was Graecicized and introduced into the ancient Greek language as μάγος and μαγεία. In doing so it transformed meaning, gaining negative connotations, with the magos being regarded as a charlatan whose ritual practices were fraudulent, strange, unconventional, and dangerous. As noted by Davies, for the ancient Greeks—and subsequently for the ancient Romans—"magic was not distinct from religion but rather an unwelcome, improper expression of it—the religion of the other". The historian Richard Gordon suggested that for the ancient Greeks, being accused of practicing magic was "a form of insult". Pliny the Elder seems to acknowledge that Magi are priests of a foreign religion, along the lines of the druids of the Celts in Britain and Gaul.

Connotations of magic have varied from positive to negative at times throughout history, Within Western culture, magic has been linked to ideas of the Other, foreignness, and primitivism; indicating that it is "a powerful marker of cultural difference" and likewise, a non-modern phenomenon. During the late nineteenth and early twentieth centuries, Western intellectuals perceived the practice of magic to be a sign of a primitive mentality and also commonly attributed it to marginalised groups of people.

== Intersections ==
Even in places and times where magic and religion are considered distinct, separate concepts there have been numerous historical intersections where aspects from one would be syncretized with or borrowed from the other.

=== Rituals ===
Both magic and religion contain rituals. Most cultures have or have had in their past some form of magical tradition that recognizes a shamanistic interconnectedness of spirit. This may have been long ago, as a folk tradition that died out with the establishment of a major world religion, such as Judaism, Christianity, Islam, Buddhism, Hinduism, or Sikhism, or it may still co-exist with that world religion. This coexistence is common globally; for example, practices associated with Coptic Christians were writing magical spells from the 1st to 12th centuries. Today, as well, traditions like Vodou or Santeria exist alongside Catholicism in the Caribbean and Americas, while various forms of folk religion remain alongside Shinto and Buddhism in East Asia.

=== Names of the gods as true names ===
There is a long-standing belief in the power of true names, this often descends from the magical belief that knowing a being's true name grants power over it.

If names have power, then knowing the name of a god regarded as supreme in a religion should grant the greatest power of all. This belief is reflected in traditional Wicca, where the names of the Goddess and the Horned God – the two supreme deities in Wicca – are usually held as a secret to be revealed only to initiates. This belief is also reflected in ancient Judaism, which used the Tetragrammaton (YHWH, usually translated as "Lord" in small caps) to refer to God in the Tanakh. The same belief is seen in Hinduism, but with different conclusions; rather, attaining transcendence and the power of God is seen as a good thing. Thus, some Hindus chant the name of their favorite deities as often as possible, the most common being Krishna.

=== Magic and Abrahamic religions ===
Magic and Abrahamic religions have had a sometimes antagonistic history with each other. The King James Version of the Bible included the famous translation "Thou shalt not suffer a witch to live" (Exodus 22:18), and Saul is rebuked by God for seeking advice from a diviner who could contact spirits. On the other hand, seemingly magical signs are documented in the Bible: For example, both the staff of Pharaoh's sorcerers as well as the staff of Moses and Aaron could be turned into snakes (Exodus 7:8-13). However, as Scott Noegel points out, the critical difference between the magic of Pharaoh's magicians and the non-magic of Moses is in the means by which the staff becomes a snake. For the Pharaoh's magicians, they employed "their secret arts" whereas Moses merely throws down his staff to turn it into a snake. To an ancient Egyptian, the startling difference would have been that Moses neither employed secret arts nor magical words. In the Torah, Noegel points out that YHWH does not need magical rituals to act.

The words 'witch' and 'witchcraft' appear in some English versions of the Bible. Exodus 22:18 in the King James Version reads: "Thou shalt not suffer a witch to live." The precise meaning of the Hebrew word mechshepha (root kashaph) here translated as 'witch' and in some other modern versions, 'sorceress', is uncertain. In the Septuagint it was translated as pharmakeia, meaning 'pharmacy', and on this basis, Reginald Scot claimed in the 16th century that 'witch' was an incorrect translation and poisoners were intended.

== See also ==
- Anthropology of religion – Study of religion in relation to other social institutions
- Exorcism – Evicting spiritual entities from a person or area
- Goetia (magic) – Invocation of demons
- History of magic – History of supernatural phenomena
- Mysticism – Traditions of human transformation aided by religious experiences
- Myth and ritual – Two central components of religious practice
- Relationship between religion and science
- Religio – Latin origin of the modern lexeme religion
- Religion and mythology – Overlapping concepts in myth and religion
- Theories about religion
- Worship of heavenly bodies – Worship of stars and other heavenly bodies as deities
