= National Museum of Ghana =

Museum in Accra, Ghana

National Museum, Accra
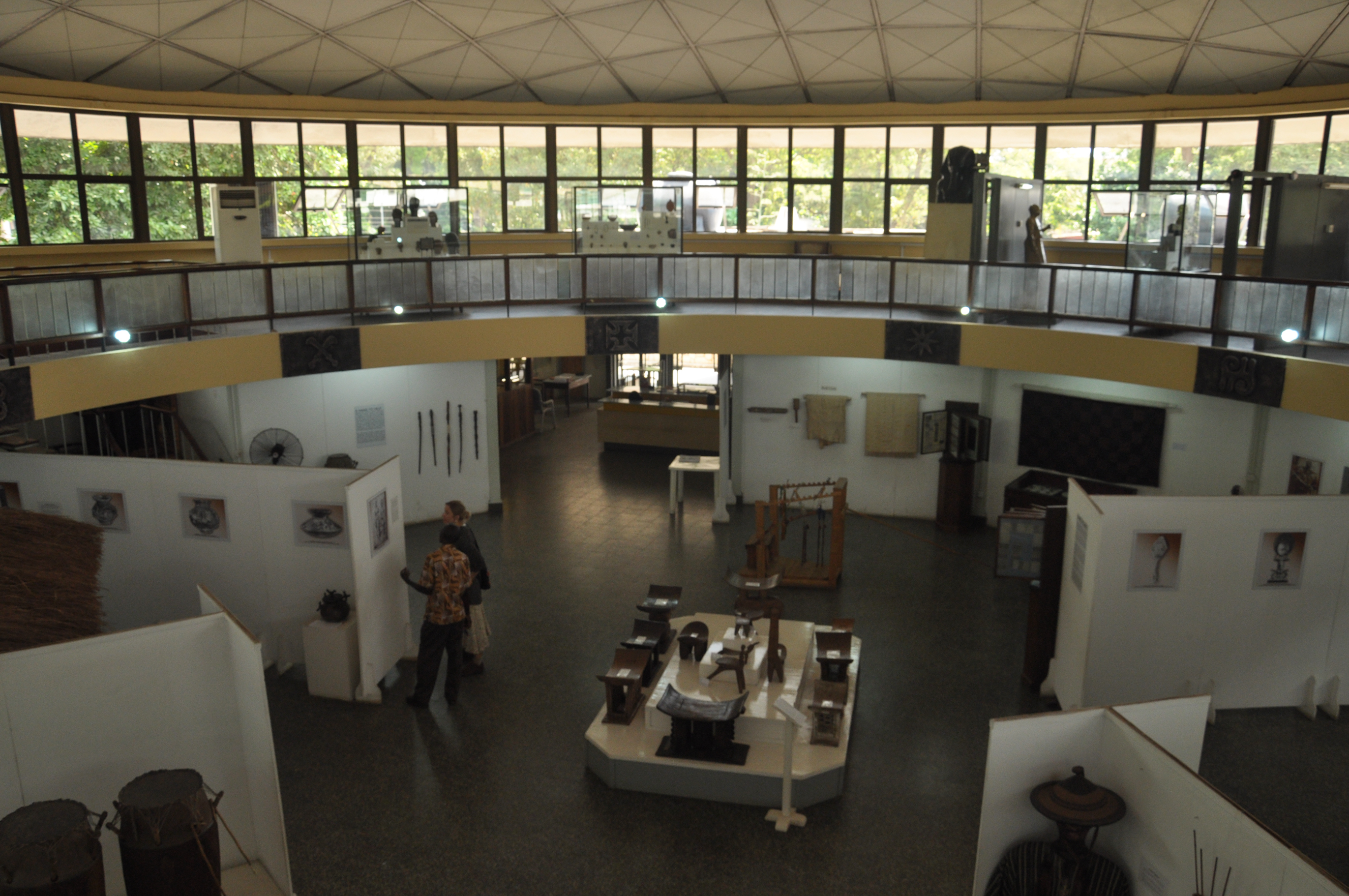
- Inside view of the National Museum
- Established: 5 March 1957; 69 years ago
- Location: 2 Barnes Road, Accra, Greater Accra, Ghana
- Coordinates: 5°33′37.5″N 0°12′23.1″W
- Type: Art museum National history museum
- Collection size: approx. 10,000+ objects
- Architects: Denys Lasdun; Lindsay Drake
- Website: ghanamuseums.org

The National Museum, also known as the National Museum of Ghana, is a museum located in Accra, Ghana. Established in 1957, it is the largest and oldest of the six museums under the administration of the Ghana Museums and Monuments Board (GMMB). The museum closed in 2015 for restoration until eventually reopening in 2022.

There are approximately 10,000 or more objects a part of the museum's collection. Objects of archaeology, ethnography as well as fine art are included in the museum. A library, a conservation laboratory, and an education hall can all be found in the museum.

== History ==
The museum's collection originated in the anthropology museum at Achimota College, founded by Charles Thurstan Shaw. It hosted the first preservation of West African artefacts in the country. Its collection was later donated to the University of Ghana in 1940 before eventually residing in the national museum until its opening, although most of the objects were not transferred.

The museum opened on 5 March 1957 right before Independence Day as part of Ghana's independence celebrations. The official opening was performed by Princess Marina. The Museum's first Director was A.W. Lawrence. The structure was a part of Nkrumah's campaign to raised nationalism and awareness upon the citizens of the new unified nation.

== Architecture ==
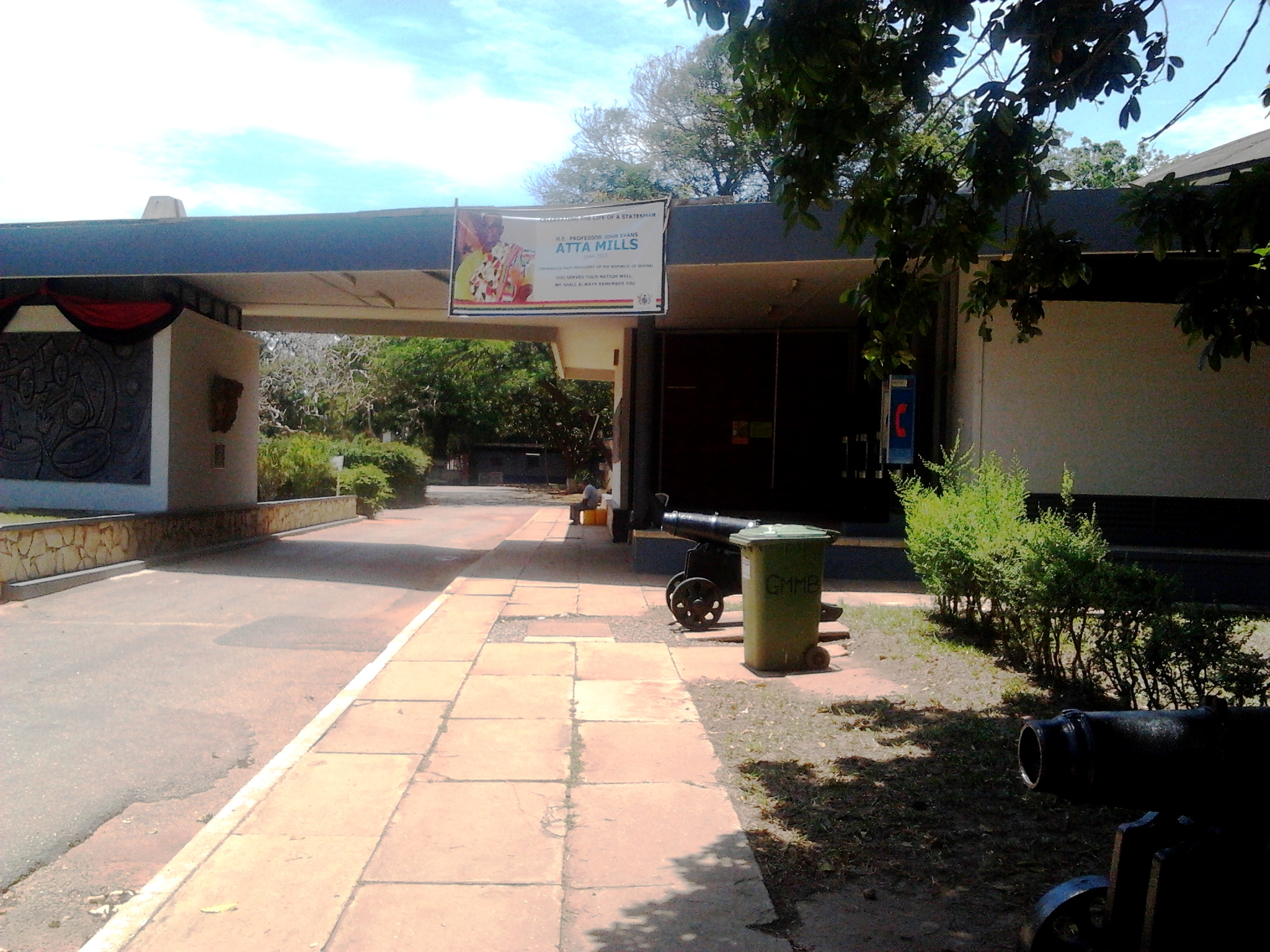
Main entrance of the National Museum

The structure was built by the Gold Coast Public Works Department with help of British architects Denys Lasdun and Lindsay Drake. It is made out of concrete, with windows set in saw-toothed angles ninety degrees to the outer wall. Going past the porte cochère is a low saucer-shaped aluminium dome above an ambulatory, which leads to the rest of the building.

== Exhibits ==
The National Museum's exhibits focused on topics such as prehistoric Africa, Ghanaian culture, and African history, although it excluded any references to Ghana’s past that were problematic. Most of the objects are of Akan origin since much of the objects were found in commercial mining areas within the Akan territories. In the 1990s, exhibits about the history of the transatlantic slave trade was added.

== See also ==
- List of museums in Ghana
