= Henry Gardinn =

Dutch alleged sorcerer and werewolf

Henry Gardinn (died in Heusden or Maastricht, 1605) was an alleged sorcerer and werewolf.

== Life ==
Gardinn originated from Limburg. In 1605, he was charged with witchcraft by being a werewolf. He was accused of having transformed himself to a wolf together with two other men, one of whom was Jan Le Loup. Gardinn made a statement of confession that the three men had attacked, murdered and eaten a child in the shape of wolves.

Gardinn was judged guilty of witchcraft for being a werewolf, and was sentenced to burning at the stake by a Dutch court in Limburg. The execution took place in either Heusden or in Maastricht. His alleged accomplice Jan Le Loup left the parish, was apprehended two years later, and executed as well.

== Fiction ==
Henry Gardinn was used as the model for a werewolf in the series Spike and Suzy.

== See also ==
- Gilles Garnier
- Werewolf witch trials
- Valais witch trials, also a combined werewolf witch trial
- Peter Stubbe
- Werewolf of Châlons
