= Werewolf witch trials =

Historical witch trials combined with werewolf trials

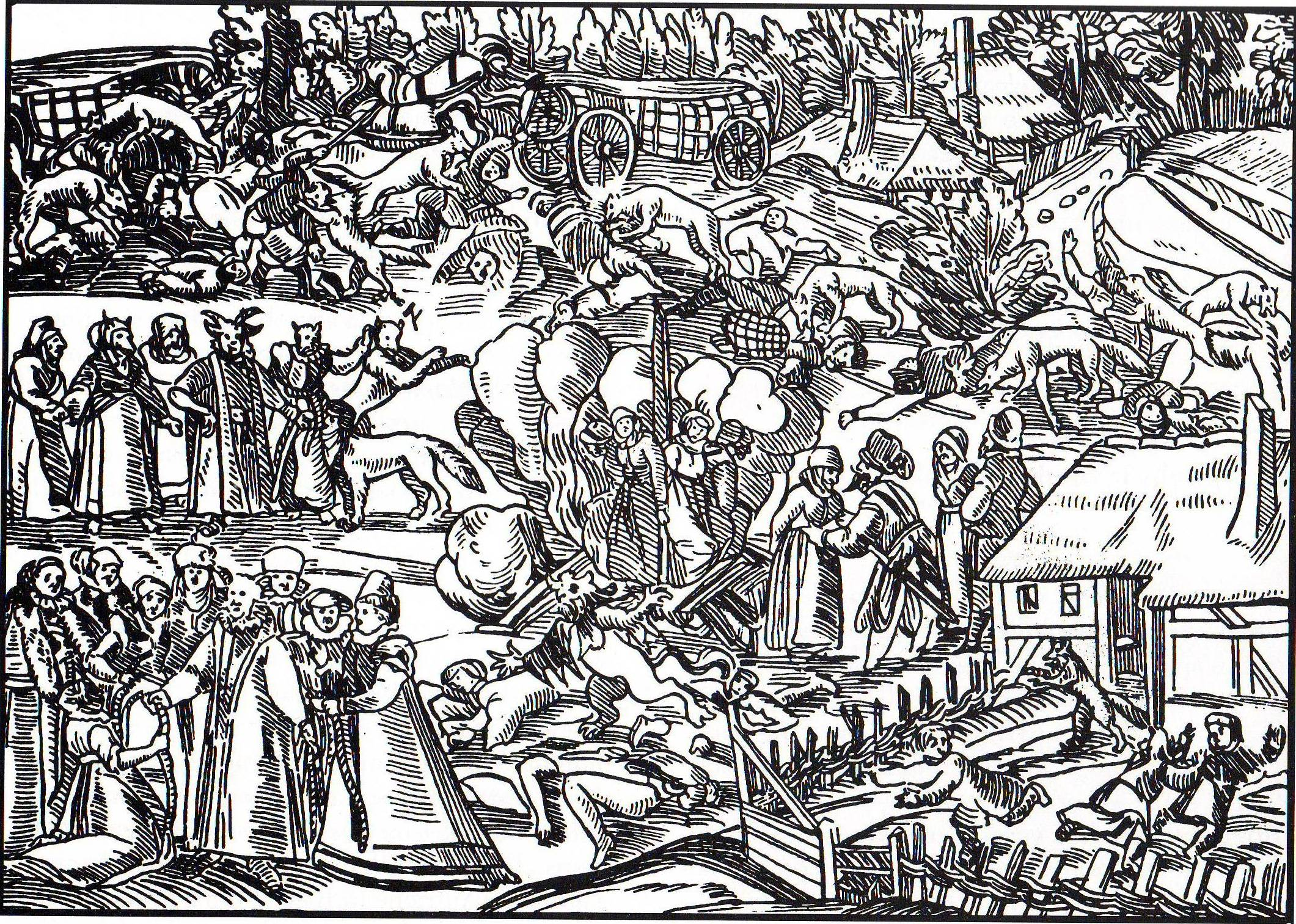
"The She Wolves of Jülich", 1591.

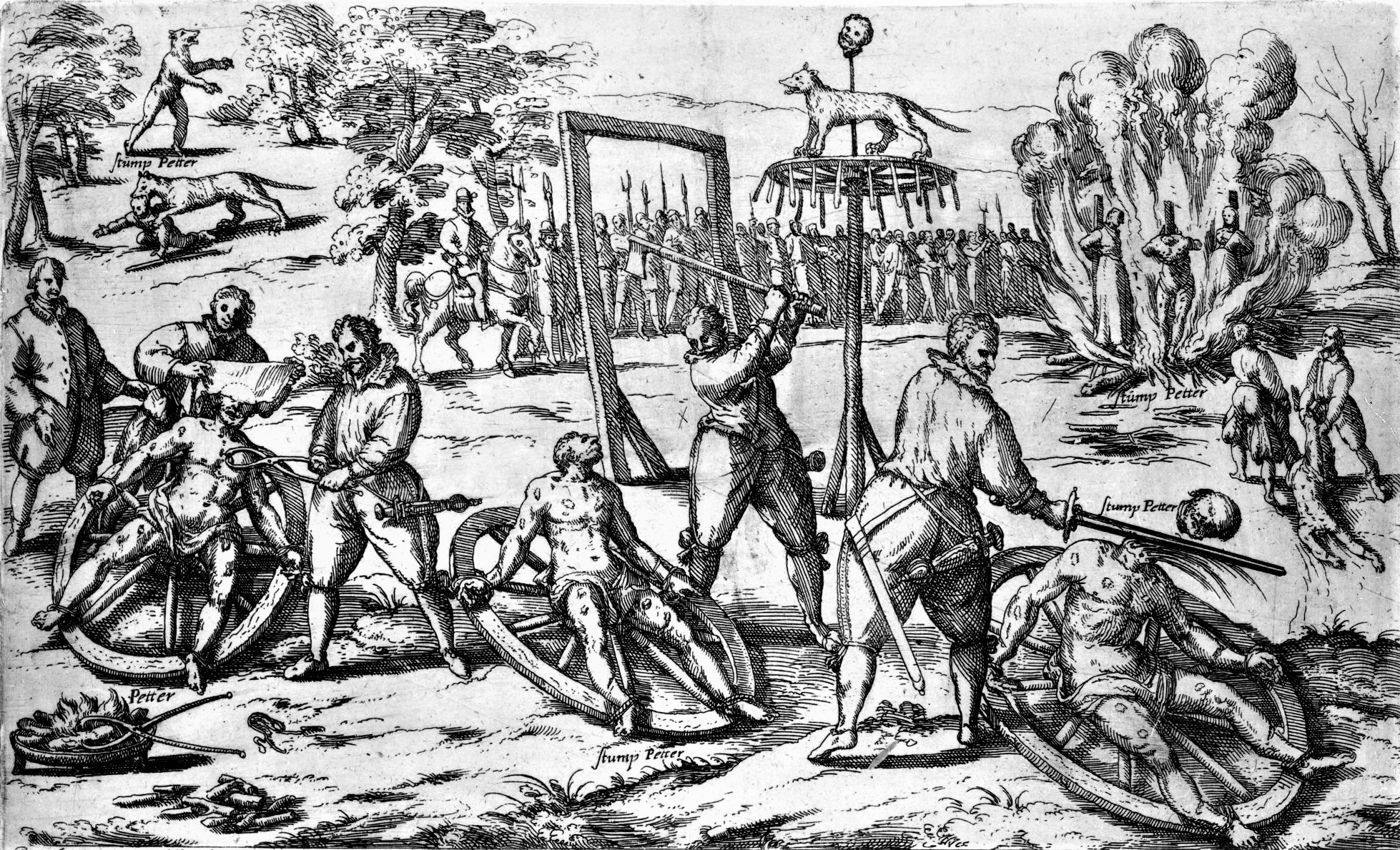
Composite woodcut print by Lukas Mayer of the execution of Peter Stumpp in 1589 at Bedburg near Cologne.

Werewolf witch trials were witch trials combined with werewolf trials. Belief in werewolves developed parallel to the belief in European witches, in the course of the Late Middle Ages and the Early Modern period. Like the witchcraft trials as a whole, the trial of supposed werewolves emerged in what is now Switzerland (especially the Valais and Vaud) during the Valais witch trials in the early 15th century and spread throughout Europe in the 16th, peaking in the 17th and subsiding by the 18th century. The persecution of werewolves and the associated folklore is an integral part of the "witch-hunt" phenomenon, albeit a marginal one, with accusations of lycanthropy involved in only a small fraction of witchcraft trials.

During the early period, accusations of lycanthropy (transformation into a wolf) were mixed with accusations of wolf-riding or wolf-charming. The 1589 case of Peter Stumpp led to a significant peak in both interest in and persecution of supposed werewolves, primarily in French-speaking and German-speaking Europe. Werewolf trials reached Livonia in the 17th century, and would become the most common form of witch-trial in that country. The phenomenon persisted longest in Bavaria and Austria, with persecution of wolf-charmers persisting until well after 1650, the final cases being recorded in the early 18th century in Carinthia and Styria.

== France ==
France experienced several dozen werewolf witch trials around the end of the 16th century. In many of the cases, such as that of the Gandillon Family, the infamous "Werewolf of Châlons" and Jacques Roulet of Angers, the accused were also accused of murder and cannibalism.

One of the most well known of the werewolf witch trials of France was that of Gilles Garnier of Dole in 1573.

== Livonia ==
In Livonia, the indigenous peasantry, in contrast to the Baltic-German burghers and nobility, often continued to conduct pagan worshiping in defiance to both the Christian church, the authorities and nobility, the entire 17th-century. Consequently, they did not believe in Satan and therefore not in witches or Satanic pacts. They did, however, believe in both malevolent magic as well as in the existence of werewolves, though they did not associate them with Satan, as the church and authorities did.

The result of this was when the Baltic peasantry accused any one of practicing black magic or of causing damage to humans lives, property and animals while in the shape of a werewolf, the authorities interpreted this in to accusations of witchcraft and Satanic pacts, and pressed the accused to adjust their confessions in accordance with the European witchcraft model during torture.

In at least 18 trials between 1527 and 1725, 18 women and 13 men were accused of having caused harm in the shape of werewolves. The accused often confessed to have been given their "wolf skins" by another person or by a demon, sometimes after having eaten something particular, and hid them, usually under a rock, when they did not use them. In 1636, for example, a woman from Kurna claimed to have been taken into the woods by an old woman and given berries to eat, and then begun to hunt with the woman in the woods as wolves.

People did not only turn into wolves, but also bears. The testimony of Gret of Pärnau claimed that while Kanti Hans and his spouse had turned into wolves, a female accomplice of them had taken the shape of a bear (1633). The accused never voluntarily claimed to have had any association with Satan, but through leading questions and torture, the authorities adjusted confessions about werewolves into confessions about witchcraft, which resulted in convictions and executions of the claimed werewolves as witches. As late as in 1696, Greta, the daughter of Titza Thomas, gave testimony that a whole pack of eleven werewolves were hunting in the woods around Vastemoisa under their leader Libbe Matz.

=== Hans the Werewolf ===
The trial of "Hans the Werewolf" is a typical example of the combined werewolf and witch trials, which dominated witch hunts in Livonia.

In 1651, Hans was brought before the court in Idavere accused of being a werewolf at the age of eighteen. He had confessed that he had hunted as a werewolf for two years. He claimed he had gotten the body of a wolf by a man in black. "When asked by the judges if his body took part in the hunt, or if only his soul was transmuted, Hans confirmed that he had found a dog's teeth-marks on his own leg, which he had received while a werewolf. Further asked whether he felt himself to be a man or a beast while transmuted, he said that he felt himself to be beast".

Thereby, the court considered it proof that he had not merely entered the body of a wolf, but really transformed into one, which meant he had undergone a magical transformation. Furthermore, as he was given this disguise by a "man in black," which the court thought was obviously Satan, he could be judged guilty of witchcraft and sentenced to death. In the Baltic countries, this was a common method of turning a werewolf trial into a witch trial.

=== Thiess of Kaltenbrun ===
The werewolf was not always regarded as evil in the Baltic. A notable case in Jürgensburg in Livonia (in present-day Latvia) in 1692, follows a similar pattern, but did not end in a death sentence: the eighty-year-old Thiess confessed to being a werewolf who, with other werewolves, regularly went to hell three times a year to fight the witches and wizards of Satan to ensure a good harvest. This case was also noted by Carlo Ginzburg as similar to that of the Benandanti. The court tried to make Thiess confess that he had made a pact with the devil and that the werewolf was in the service of Satan, but they did not succeed, and he was sentenced to whipping on 10 October 1692.

== The Netherlands ==
In the Netherlands, the accusation of being a werewolf is described as principally synonymous with an accusation of being a witch, and there are at least two known cases of a combined werewolf- and witch trial.

During the Amersfoort and Utrecht witch trials of 1591-1595, several people were charged with witchcraft, resulting in the execution of four people, the suicide in prison of a woman and the escape of a man. Folkert Dirks was accused of sorcery with his daughter Hendrikje (17) and his sons Hessel (14), Elbert (13), Gijsbert (11), and Dirk (8). Elbert claimed that he, his father and siblings could all sometimes turn into wolves or cats by command of Satan, and they had also seen other people who did, and gathered with them to dance with the Devil and kill other animals.

Upon his testimony, his father was tortured to confess that he had been made a werewolf by Satan and attacked cattle with his children in this shape: his daughter soon confessed to have attended witches' sabbath in the shape of a wolf. Folkert Dirks, Hendrika Dirks, Anthonis Bulck, and Maria Barten, who were pointed out to belong to their werewolf pack, were all executed for witchcraft, while the sons of Dirks were spared because of their age and whipped.

In 1595, an explicit werewolf witch trial was conducted in Arnhem (Gelderland). Johan Martensen of Steenhuisen confessed to having been made a werewolf by the Devil three years previously, and to have been part of a party of eight to ten other wolves commanded by Satan to harm people and other animals. He also claimed to have bewitched people and animals. During his periods as a wolf, he claimed to have been aware, but unable to speak. He was executed, strangled and burned at the stake on 7 August 1595.

== Spanish Netherlands ==
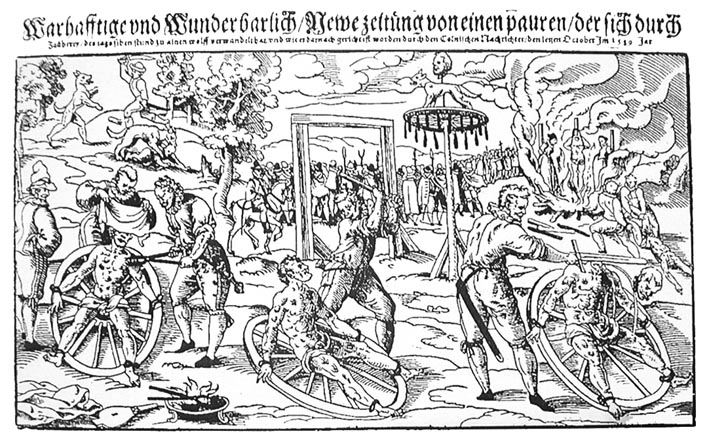
Composite woodcut print by Lukas Mayer of the execution of Peter Stumpp in 1589 at Bedburg, near Cologne

The ancient belief that humans could turn into wolves were by the Catholic church associated with the Devil. In the Spanish Netherlands, men who were accused of witchcraft were sometimes accused of being werewolves as well, though this was by no means common. Between 1589 and 1661, six men were executed for sorcery, in which three are confirmed to have been executed explicitly for being werewolves. The most famous of them were the case of Peter Stumpp. In 1598, Jan van Calster was accused of having bitten two children in the shape of a wolf, but he was acquitted from charges. In 1605, Henry Gardinn was executed after having been accused of being a werewolf and for witchcraft.

The authorities associated lycanthropy with magic and magic with Satan, and the legal courts integrated the cases of werewolves in the witchcraft category. In Mechelen, Thomas Baetens (1642) and Augustijn de Moor (1649) were accused of being werewolves in connection to their wives standing trial for witchcraft. The wives were also then accused of being werewolves, but all were acquitted from charges.

The farmer Jan "Ooike" Vindevogel south of Ghent was accused of having been seen as a werewolf several times, and was accused of being a sorcerer because of it, and burned alive for witchcraft 29 July 1652. He had pointed out his neighbor Joos Verpraet as an accomplice werewolf, and he was also burned. In 1657, Matthys Stoop was executed for sorcery after having been accused of tormenting the area as a werewolf, and forced to confess that he had been given his wolf skin by the Devil.

Known cases of men executed accused of being werewolves include that of Jan Le Loup, executed on 5 November 1607; Johan Prickelke, executed in Maaseik "a few years before 1609", and Mathys Stoop, burned 11 September 1657 in Asper-Zingem, some of them executed for witchcraft in parallel to being werewolves.

== See also ==
- Gilles Garnier
- Modern witch-hunts
- Valais witch trials
- Wolfssegen
- Werewoman

== References and sources ==
Sources

- Elmar M. Lorey, Heinrich der Werwolf: Eine Geschichte aus der Zeit der Hexenprozesse mit Dokumenten und Analysen. Anabas-Verlag 1998.
