= Gilles Garnier =

16th century French serial killer

- Died: 18 January 1574; Dole, Jura, France
- Cause of death: Burned at the stake
- Other names: The Hermit of St. Bonnot; The Werewolf of Dole
- Years active: 1572 or 1573
- Penalty: Death

Details
- Victims: 4+
- Country: France
- State: Franche-Comté

Gilles Garnier (died 18 January 1574) was a French serial killer, cannibal, and hermit convicted for being a werewolf and murdering at least four children. Already locally known as "The Hermit of St. Bonnot", he was dubbed "The Werewolf of Dole".

== Life ==
Gilles Garnier was a reclusive hermit living in an area commonly called Saint Bonnot, outside of Amanges in the County of Burgundy. He had been previously noted for trespassing disputes with the townsfolk of Amange and the larger village Dole. Garnier was purportedly a former resident of Lyon or its surrounding area and had recently been married to his new wife Appoline. Being unaccustomed to feeding more than just himself, he found it difficult to provide for his wife and the children they had, causing discontent between them.

During this period, several children went missing or were found dead and the authorities of the Franche-Comté province issued an edict encouraging and allowing the people to apprehend and kill the murderer responsible. At the time, unsolved violent crimes were frequently attributed to werewolves.

One evening, a group of workers travelling from a neighbouring town came upon what they thought in the dim light to be a wolf but what some recognised as the hermit with the body of a dead child. Soon after, Gilles Garnier was arrested and a confession was extracted through torture.

=== Crimes and trial ===
Garnier confessed (likely under torture) that while he was in the forest hunting one night, trying to find food for himself and his wife, a spectre appeared to him, offering to ease his troubles and gave him an ointment that would allow him to change into the form of a wolf, making it easier to hunt. Garnier admitted to having stalked and murdered at least four children between the ages of 9 and 12. The year the murders took place is contradictorily given as either 1572, 1573 or between both years, with his execution date of 18 January 1574 (the year being transcribed in Roman numerals as MDLXXIIII) also sometimes shifting to 1573.

On the Friday before the end of the Feast of Saint Bartholomew (24 August), he attacked a boy, aged 12 or 13, near Perrouse and Cromary. The victim was "torn in half" with bites and his belly was torn open.

The next murder occurred in fall, with dates being described around the Feast of Saint Michael, either the first day (29 September) or shortly after its beginning (early October). Garnier abducted a girl, aged 10 or 12, by dragging her into a vineyard near the Gorge farm near Châtenois (spelled as Chastenoy in some sources). He strangled her, removed her clothes, and ate the flesh from her thighs and arms in nearby Serre forest. Finally he removed some flesh and took it home to his wife to cook.

In mid-October (around two weeks after the beginning of the Feast of Saint Michael), Garnier killed a 10-year-old boy between Gredisans and Menote, again cannibalising him by eating from his thighs and belly and tearing off a leg to eat it later. He also tried to strangle another boy but fled when some villagers showed up.

Some weeks later, between the 1st and the 8th of November, Garnier attacked another girl in the meadows of Le Pouppe, between Authume (spelled Athume) and Châtenois. Garnier bit, scratched, and strangled her, but was again interrupted by passers-by. The girl succumbed to her injuries a few days later.

Garnier was found guilty of "crimes of lycanthropy and witchcraft" and burned at the stake on January 18, 1574. Even though Garnier was burned at the stake, his trial was carried out by the secular authorities and not by the Inquisition, as superstition was not judged by the Inquisition. More than 50 witnesses deposed that he had attacked and killed children in the fields and vineyards, devouring their raw flesh. He was sometimes seen in human shape, and sometimes as a "loup-garou".

It was claimed by the early 17th century that "Garnier" or "Grenier" was a common name among people accused of being werewolves, naming Jean Grenier, his father as well as his son Pierre, and François and Estienne Garnier as examples.

== See also ==
- Child cannibalism
- Hans the Werewolf
- Henry Gardinn
- List of incidents of cannibalism
- List of French serial killers
- Peter Stumpp
- Werewolf of Châlons
