= Werewolf of Châlons =

French murderer and cannibal (died 1598)

Nicolas Damont, known as Werewolf of Châlons, Tailor of Châlons or Demon Tailor of Châlons (died 1598), was a French man who was executed for murder, cannibalism, and for allegedly being a werewolf.

== The case ==
Nicolas Damont was active as a tailor with his own workshop in the city of Châlons.

He was put on trial accused of having murdered a number of children. He was accused of luring children into his tailor shop, subjecting them to sexual abuse, murdering them by cutting their throats, and of eating them. He was also accused of having hunted for his child victims in the forests in the shape of a wolf, and thereby of being a werewolf.

When his tailor shop was searched by the authorities, they reportedly found human bones in the basement. Nicolas Damont reportedly confessed to his crimes before the court. His confessions were said to be so horrible that the court ordered all the documents of them to be destroyed.

Nicolas Damont was sentenced to death for murder, cannibalism and for being a werewolf. He was executed by being burned alive at the stake. According to tradition, he was said to have uttered curses and called for the Devil when he was burned.

== Legacy ==
The case became a well known subject of folklore and myth. The reliability of the circulating information is unknown, as the original court documents were reportedly destroyed.

== See also ==
- Child cannibalism
- Gilles Garnier
- Hans the Werewolf
- Henry Gardinn
- Peter Stumpp

== Bibliography ==
- S. Baring-Gould, The Book of Were-Wolves
- Nigel Cawthorne, Witch Hunt: History of Persecution
- A. Rowlands, Witchcraft and Masculinities in Early Modern Europe
