= Segen =

German word and folk term

Segen is a German word translating to "blessing, benediction; charm; prayer; spell, incantation".

It is in origin a loan from Latin signum sīgnāre "to make a sign", viz. the Sign of the Cross used to confer a Christian blessing, The term is attested as Old High German seganōn from as early as c. AD 800, resulting in a modern segnen "to bless". The noun Segen "blessing" was derived from the verb at an early time, attested in the 9th century as segan. Old English had the corresponding sægnan, which survives as the dialectal (esp. Scottish) sain (popularized by Scott, Heart of Mid-Lothian "God sain us"). The concept of Segen, understood magically, was very productive in the folklore, folk religion and superstition of German-speaking Europe, studied in great detail by the German philologists and folklorists of the 19th century.

The medieval church used the Segen (the sign of the cross with a spoken formula) liberally, intended as an act with protective effect, putting the person or thing blessed under the protection of God. Nor was the action reserved for priests or clerics, but any Christian was permitted to make the sign of the cross and invoke the protection of God. Thus the Segen came to be seen as the inverse of the curse (Fluch), magical acts with the power to either protect or harm. The concept of Segen thus became the continuant of the incantation formulas of the pre-Christian period (the only surviving samples of which are the Merseburg Incantations).

Use of such formulas was partly encouraged by the Church, as they did superficially involve an expression of piety by the invocation of God, Christ or the Virgin Mary, but at the same time their magical use was viewed with scepticism and was sometimes repressed.

By the time of the Early Modern witch-hunts, the term segen had become ambiguous, and depending on context could refer to a harmless farewell, to a pious invocation of God, or to a Satanic or superstitious spell (pro incantamento et adjuratione magica Stieler 1669; e.g. Wolfssegen "contra lupos").

si (landstreicher) kunnen sagen vom vinstern sternen und tuond die lüt segen lernen für den donder und den hagel

— Des Teufels Netz v. 6367 (15th century)
Translation:

they [vagabonds] know tales of dark stars and teach people spells [segen] for [to control] thunder and hail.

This early modern usage survives in dialectal variation throughout the rural parts of German-speaking Europe. For German-speaking Switzerland, the Schweizerisches Idiotikon 7,444 "Sëgeⁿ" records some two dozen compounds in -sëgeⁿ, in some of which Segen takes the meaning "prayer" and in others "spell, charm". A notable concept in Swiss folklore is the Alpsegen (Alpe(n)sëgeⁿ, Alpsëgeⁿ 7,451), a folk religious custom in Alpine Switzerland where every night a prayer must be sung over each Alpine pasture. This combined the function of an apotropaic charm with a practical aspect of communicating between remote pastures; if the Alpsegen was not heard from a neighbouring site, it would be a sign that a misfortune or accident had befallen and the neighbours would come to aid.
