= Catherine Quicquat =

French woman executed for witchcraft

Catherine Quicquat (died 1448) was a French woman who was executed for witchcraft.

She is one of the most well documented of the victims of the Valais witch trials. Her case was one of the first in the Pays de Vaud.

Catherine Quicquat was acquainted with Blandis Loquuis (also known as Sybille Gonra) and Perronet Mercier, who invited her to dinner before they were accused of sorcery. She was interrogated by the inquisitor Pierre d'Aulnay in Vevey 17 March 1448 under torture and confessed to have been introduced to sorcery by Jeannette Avonsaz, Pierre Flour and Sibylle Blandis Loquiis. On a witches' sabbath, she had met the master of the sabbath, which was a fox by the name of Rabiel. Catherine Quicquat attended the sabbath in 1437. She pointed out the notaries Jean Got and Jean Boverat from Vevey, who participated in the witch trials, as accomplices. Her accusation was one of many who contributed to the case of Jean Boverat. Catherine Quicquat was executed by burning.
