= Peter Stumpp =

Possible German serial killer tried for allegedly being a werewolf

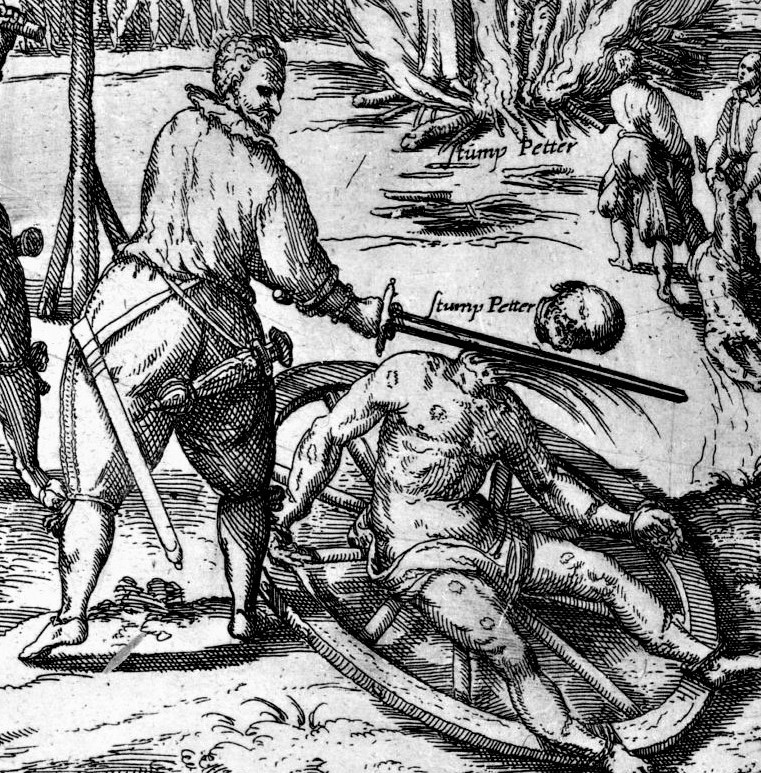
- Woodcut showing the beheading of Peter Stumpp in Cologne in 1589
- Born: c. 1530 near Bedburg, Germany
- Died: 31 October 1589 (aged c. 58–59); Cologne, Germany
- Cause of death: Execution by decapitation
- Other names: The Werewolf of Bedburg; Peter Stumpf; Peter Stube; Peter Stub; Peter Stubbe; Peter Stübbe; Abal Griswold; Abil Griswold; Ubel Griswold
- Penalty: Death by breaking

Details
- Victims: 18 (including 2 unborn children)
- Span of crimes: c. 1564–1589
- Country: Holy Roman Empire
- State: Electorate of Cologne
- Date apprehended: 1589

Peter Stumpp (c. 1530 – 31 October 1589; name is also spelt as Peter Stube, Peter Stubbe, Peter Stübbe or Peter Stumpf) was a German farmer and alleged serial killer, accused of werewolfery, witchcraft, and cannibalism. He was known as "the Werewolf of Bedburg".

== Sources ==
The most comprehensive source on the case is a 16-page pamphlet published in London in 1590, the translation of a German print of which no copies have survived. The English pamphlet, of which two copies exist (one in the British Museum and one in the Lambeth Library), was rediscovered by occultist Montague Summers in 1920. It describes Stumpp's life, his alleged crimes, and the trial, and includes many statements from neighbours and witnesses on the crimes. Summers reprints the entire pamphlet, including a woodcut, on pages 253 to 259 of his work The Werewolf.

Additional information is provided by the diaries of Hermann von Weinsberg, a Cologne alderman, and by a number of illustrated broadsheets, which were printed in southern Germany. Contemporary reference was made to the pamphlet by Edward Fairfax in his firsthand account of the alleged witch persecution of his own daughters in 1621.

== Life and career ==
Although the exact place and date of Peter Stumpp's birth is unknown, examining sources likely puts it near Bedburg, Germany, around 1530. Stumpp's name is also spelt as Peter Stube, Peter Stub, Peter Stubbe, Peter Stübbe or Peter Stumpf, and other aliases include such names as Abal Griswold, Abil Griswold, and Ubel Griswold. The name "Stump" or "Stumpf" may have been given to him as a reference to the fact that his left hand had been cut off, leaving only a stump, in German "Stumpf". It was alleged that as the "werewolf" had its left forepaw cut off, then the same injury proved the guilt of the man.

Stump, who likely was a Protestant, was a wealthy farmer in his rural community. During the 1580s, he seems to have been a widower with two children: a daughter called Beele (Sybil), who seems to have been older than 15 years, and a son of unknown age.

== Accusations ==
During 1589, Stumpp had one of the most lurid and famous werewolf trials in history. After being stretched on a rack, and before further torture commenced, he confessed to having practised black magic since he was 12 years old. He claimed that the Devil had given him a magical belt or girdle, which enabled him to metamorphose into "the likeness of a greedy, devouring wolf, strong and mighty, with eyes great and large, which in the night sparkled like fire, a mouth great and wide, with most sharp and cruel teeth, a huge body, and mighty paws." Removing the belt, he said, made him transform back to his human form. After his capture, he told the local magistrate he had left the girdle in a "certain valley". The magistrate sent for it to be retrieved, but no such belt was ever found.

For 25 years, Stumpp had allegedly been an "insatiable bloodsucker" who gorged on the flesh of goats, lambs, and sheep, as well as women and children. Being threatened with torture, he confessed to killing and eating 14 children and two pregnant women, whose fetuses he ripped from their wombs and "ate their hearts panting hot and raw," which he later described as "dainty morsels." One of the 14 children was his son, whose brain he was reported to have devoured. Stumpp loved his son dearly, but in the end, his bloodlust prevailed. Allegedly, he went out with his son into the woods, transformed into the likeness of a wolf and devoured him.

Not only was Stumpp accused of being a serial murderer and cannibal, but also of having an incestuous relationship with his daughter, who was sentenced to die with him, and of having coupled with a distant relative, which was also considered to be incest according to the law. In addition to this, he confessed to having had sexual intercourse with a succubus sent to him by the Devil.

== Execution ==
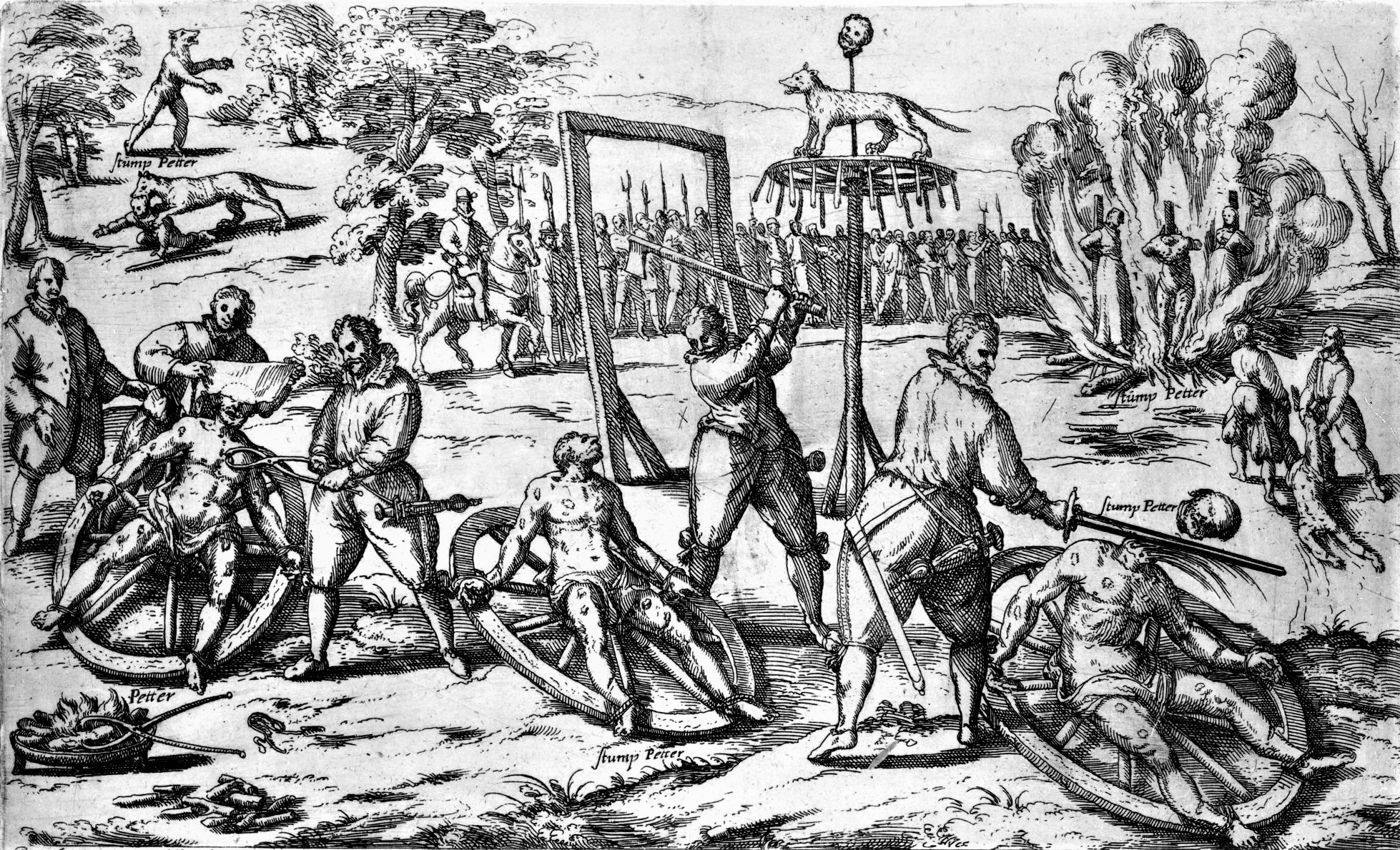
Composite woodcut print by Lukas Mayer of the execution of Peter Stumpp in 1589 at Bedburg near Cologne

The execution of Stumpp, on 31 October 1589, alongside his daughter Beele (Sybil) and mistress, Katherine, is one of the most brutal on record: he was put to a wheel, where "flesh was torn from his body", in ten places, with red-hot pincers, followed by his arms and legs. Then his limbs were broken with the blunt side of an axehead before he was beheaded and his body burned on a pyre. His daughter and mistress had already been flayed and strangled, and were burned along with Stumpp's body. As a warning against similar behaviour, local authorities erected a pole with the torture wheel and the figure of a wolf on it, and at the very top, they placed Peter Stumpp's severed head.

== In popular culture ==
- The U.S. metal band Macabre recorded a song about Peter Stumpp, titled "The Werewolf of Bedburg"; it can be found on the Murder Metal album.
- The German horror punk band The Other recorded a song about Peter Stumpp, titled "Werewolf of Bedburg" on their Casket Case album.
- In the Pine Deep Trilogy of novelist and folklorist Jonathan Maberry, Peter Stumpp is the supernatural villain Ubel Griswold. Since Griswold is actually one of Stumpp's historical aliases, Maberry decided to use the name of Ubel Griswold instead of openly telling people that the villain was the infamous werewolf Peter Stumpp until later on in the third book of the series, Bad Moon Rising.
- The direct-to-video Big Top Scooby-Doo! uses a portion of Lukas Mayer's woodcut of the execution of Stumpp in 1589, though in the movie no mention of Stumpp is made. The portion used depicts a man cutting off a werewolf's left paw (supposedly Stumpp in werewolf form) and a child being attacked by a werewolf. The woodcut scene shown in the film restores the werewolf's left paw and removes the child in the second werewolf's jaws, making it appear as if the swordsman is fighting one of the werewolves while another flees.
- In the Doctor Who audio drama Loups-Garoux, Pieter Stubbe was in fact a werewolf. He managed to escape before he was executed and lived for another five centuries. He was defeated by the Fifth Doctor in Brazil in 2080. It is implied that he ate both the Grand Duchess Anastasia and Lord Lucan.
- In episode 3 of the podcast Lore, the story of Peter Stumpp was retold. In 2017, the podcast episode was adapted into the 5th episode of the TV series adaptation of Lore, where Stumpp was played by Adam Goldberg.
- Reference is made to Stubbe Peter in Chapter 17 of Deborah Harkness's Shadow of Night—the second novel in her All Souls trilogy. His trial and execution are reported in a pamphlet that the protagonists take as signs that witches and vampires are under greater threat than expected. Werewolves are seen in the book as a human fable based on sightings and experiences with the wolf-esque vampires of the book's world.
- In the TV series Friends from College, Stumpp is discussed and used as a reference for a YA novel in season 1, episode 7 "Grand Cayman".
- The German metal band Powerwolf recorded a song about Peter Stumpp, titled "1589". It was released on 17 May 2024 as a single as part of their promotion of their album Wake Up the Wicked.
- The 2023 thriller film Torn has a main character named Peter Stube who is fighting his inner demons, and the werewolf folklore of a small town.

== See also ==
- Gilles Garnier
- Hans the Werewolf
- Henry Gardinn
- Manuel Blanco Romasanta
- Werewolf of Châlons
- Child cannibalism
- List of German serial killers
- List of serial killers before 1900
