= Cromary =

- Commune
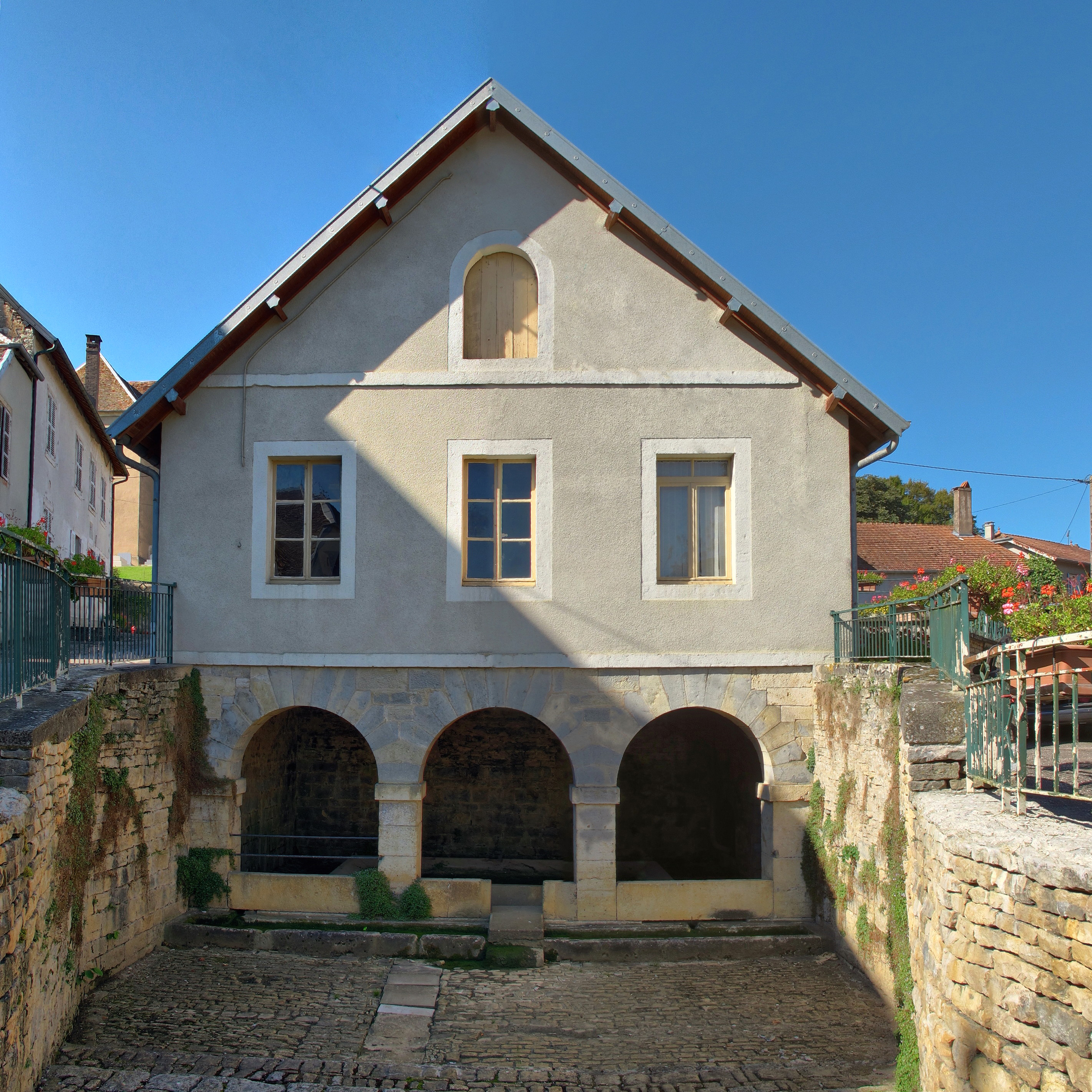
- The town hall in Cromary
- Location of Cromary
- Location within France Location within Bourgogne-Franche-Comté
- Coordinates: 47°21′46″N 6°04′39″E
- Country: France
- Region: Bourgogne-Franche-Comté
- Department: Haute-Saône
- Arrondissement: Vesoul
- Canton: Rioz

Government
  - Mayor (2020–2026): Jean Berger
- Area^{1}: 5.36 km^{2} (2.07 sq mi)
- Highest elevation: 282 m (925 ft)
- Lowest elevation: 215 m (705 ft)
- Population (2023): 246
  - Density: 45.9/km^{2} (119/sq mi)
- Time zone: UTC+01:00 (CET)
  - Summer (DST): UTC+02:00 (CEST)
- INSEE/Postal code: 70189 /70190
- ^{1} French Land Register data, which excludes lakes, ponds, glaciers > 1 km^{2} (0.386 sq mi or 247 acres) and river estuaries.

Cromary (French pronunciation: [kʁɔmaʁi]) is a commune in the Haute-Saône department in the region of Bourgogne-Franche-Comté in eastern France.

== Land cover ==
Land cover in the municipality, as shown in the European biophysical land cover database Corine Land Cover (CLC), is characterized by the significant presence of agricultural land (66.6% in 2018), a proportion identical to that of 1990 (66.6%). The detailed breakdown in 2018 is as follows: arable land (55.6%), forests (25.4%), heterogeneous agricultural areas (8.6%), urbanized areas (5.1%), inland waters (Note: Les eaux continentales désignent toutes les eaux de surface, en général des eaux douces issues d'eau de pluie, qui se trouvent à l'intérieur des terres.) (2.9%), grasslands (2.3%). The evolution of land use in the municipality and its infrastructure can be observed on the different cartographic representations of the territory: the Cassini map (18th century), the staff map (1820-1866) and the maps or aerial photos of the IGN for the current period (1950 to today).

== See also ==
- Communes of the Haute-Saône department
