= Wolfssegen =

Bavarian charm against wolves

In Bavarian folklore of the Early Modern period, a Wolfssegen ([vɔlfs.ˈzeːɡn̩]; also Wolfsegen, Wolf-Segen) was an apotropaic charm against wolves; conversely, a Wolfbann (Wolf-Bann) was a malevolent spell causing a wolf attack.

The Wolfssegen is just one specific example of various distinct kinds of Segen ("blessing; charm, incantation") in the folklore of German-speaking Europe.

Early examples of Wolfssegen survive from the Late Middle Ages. The use of these charms seems to have peaked during the 17th century, when they were offered by professional "wolf charmers" (Wolfssegner or Wolfbanner). This corresponds to the cold period known as the Little Ice Age, for which there is ample historical evidence of wolf populations in much of the Bavarian Alps. There is no extant text of a Wolfbann, the malevolent opposite of the Wolfsegen. However, there is the text of a spell reversing a Wolfbann recorded in 1635, in effect again a Wolfsegen, but against a specific wolf earlier conjured by a Wolfbann.

The Wolfssegner, or more generally Segner, were mostly destitute elderly men who made a living by selling charms or incantations. They were mostly tolerated in the 16th century, but from the 1590s they began to be persecuted as witches. During the early 1600s, a number of Wolfssegner were tried and executed as werewolves. Apparently, the Wolfssegner often used fraudulent scams in order to convince the peasants of their magical power.

These trials persisted into the 1650s, albeit without the werewolf accusation. A typical example was the trial of Thomas Heiser, aged 84. According to the protocol, Heiser underwent the first stage of torture before confessing to know how to perform the Wolf-Segen, which he had learned from a friend fifty years earlier, in Innsbruck, and had made his living by performing it for the peasantry. He claimed to be able to call the wolves to attack a specific head of cattle, and to have done this a total number of ten times over a period of 40 years. He confessed that he had to promise his soul to the devil in order to learn the charm.

In Vienna, there was also a custom known in which the text of the Liber generationis Jesu Christi (Matthew 1, viz. the beginning of the gospel) was known as Wolfssegen, chanted in a particular way after mass on Christmas Eve. This was supposed to commemorate the banning of wolves by singing the gospel in former centuries, before the city was fortified.

== In popular culture ==
The 2019 novel Empire of Wild by Cherie Dimaline features a Wolfssegner.

In the 2015 video game Fire Emblem Fates, Wolfssegner is featured as a playable class, members of which transforming into werewolf-like beasts to fight.

== See also ==
- Wolf hunt
- Wolfsangel
- Werewolf witch trials

== References and sources ==
Sources

- Wolfgang Franz von Kobell, "Jagdhistorisches über Raubwild" in Bischoff (ed.) Wissenschaftliche Vorträge gehalten zu München im Winter 1858, 1858, 204f.
- Fritz Byloff, Siegfried Kramer (eds.), Volkskundliches aus Strafprozessen der Österreichischen Alpenländer mit besonderer Berücksichtigung der Zauberei- und Hexenprozesse von 1455 bis 1850, items 31, 32 (1929).
- Johann Andreas Schmeller, Bayerisches Wörterbuch s.v. "Wolf" (1837).
- "Wolfssegen" in Meyer (ed.), Handwörterbuch des Deutschen Aberglaubens: Waage - Zypresse, Nachträge, 1974, 800f.
