= Valais witch trials =

1428-1434/6 witch hunt and trials in Valais, Switzerland

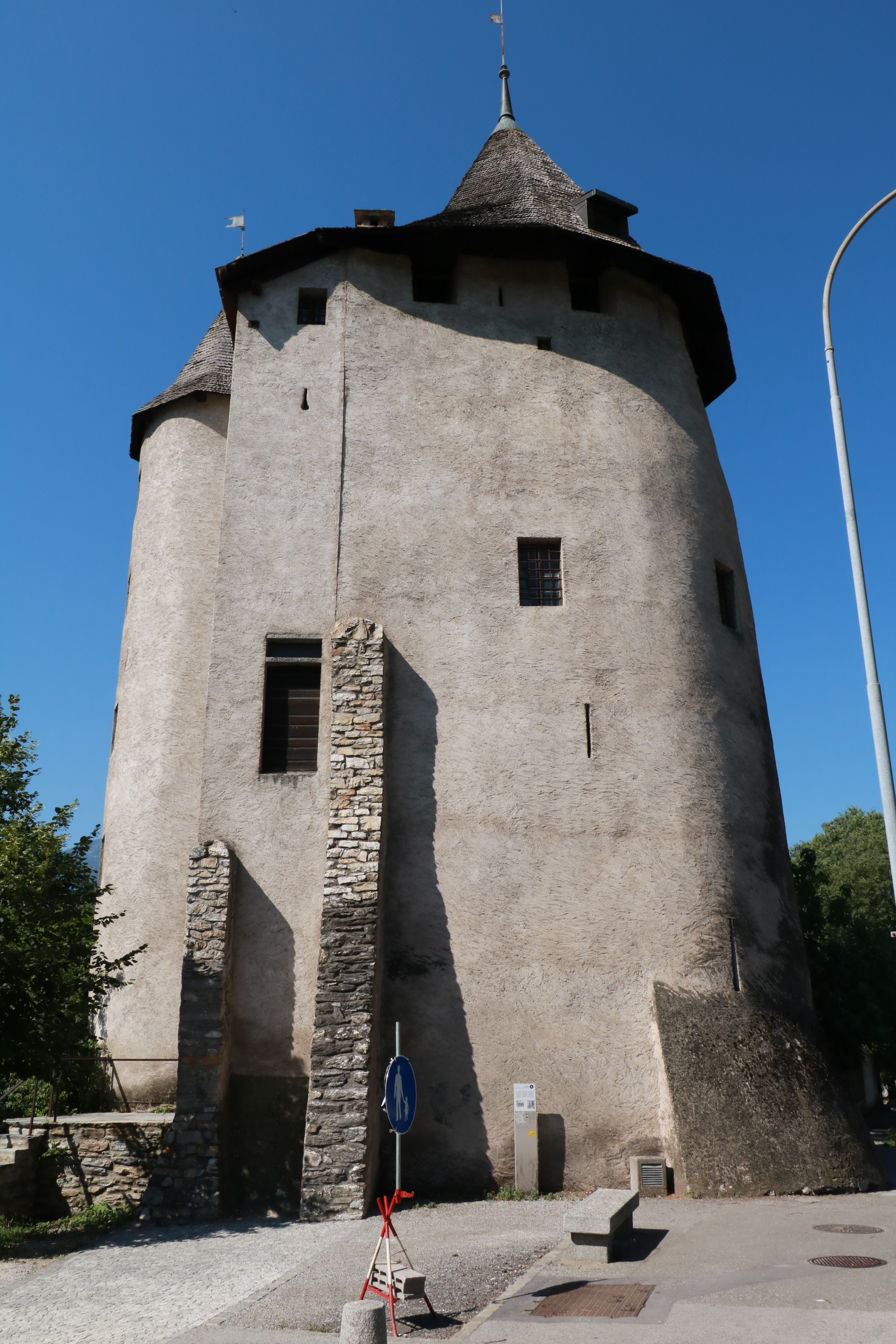
Tour des sorciers Sion

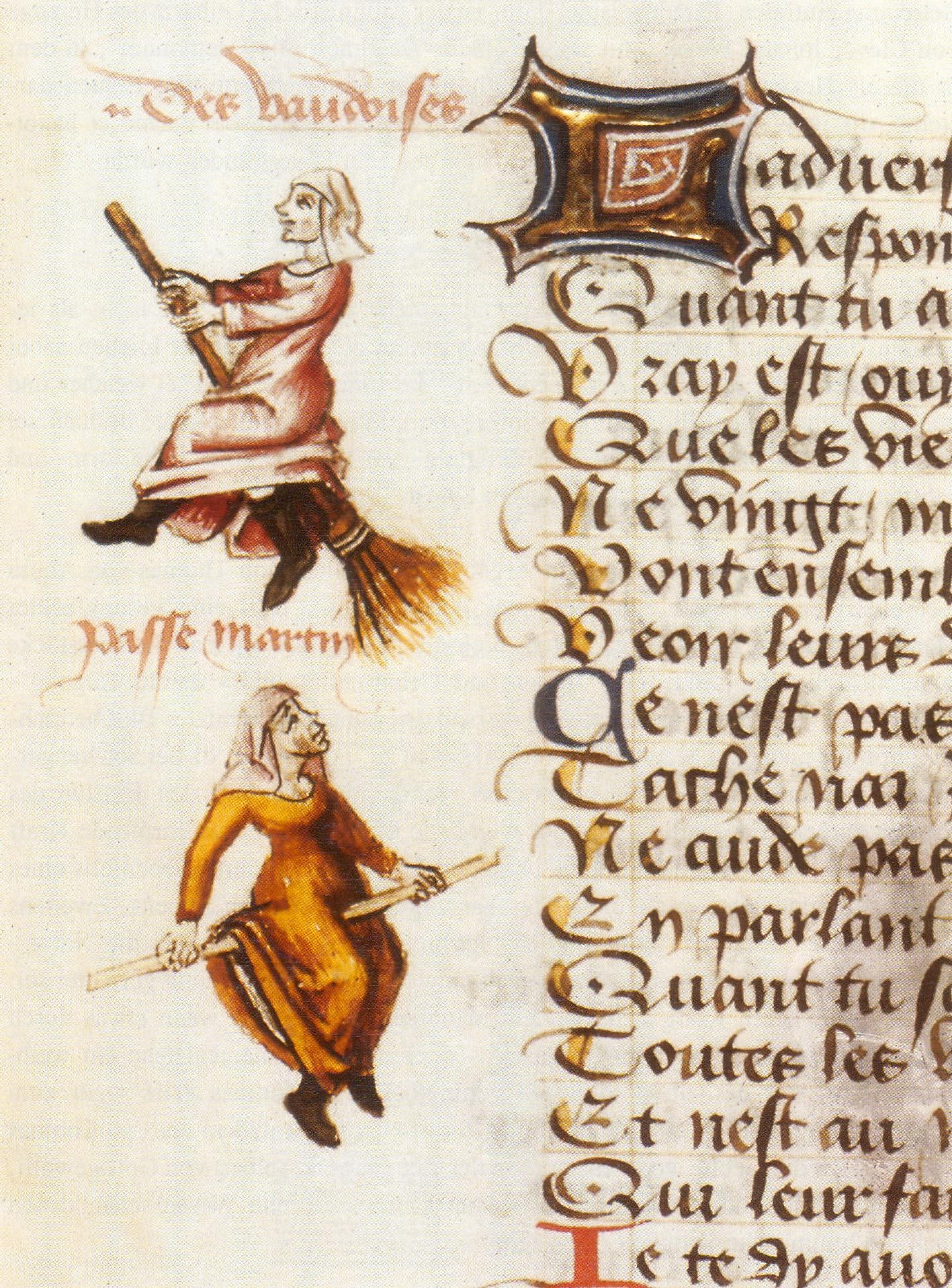
Champion des dames Vaudoises

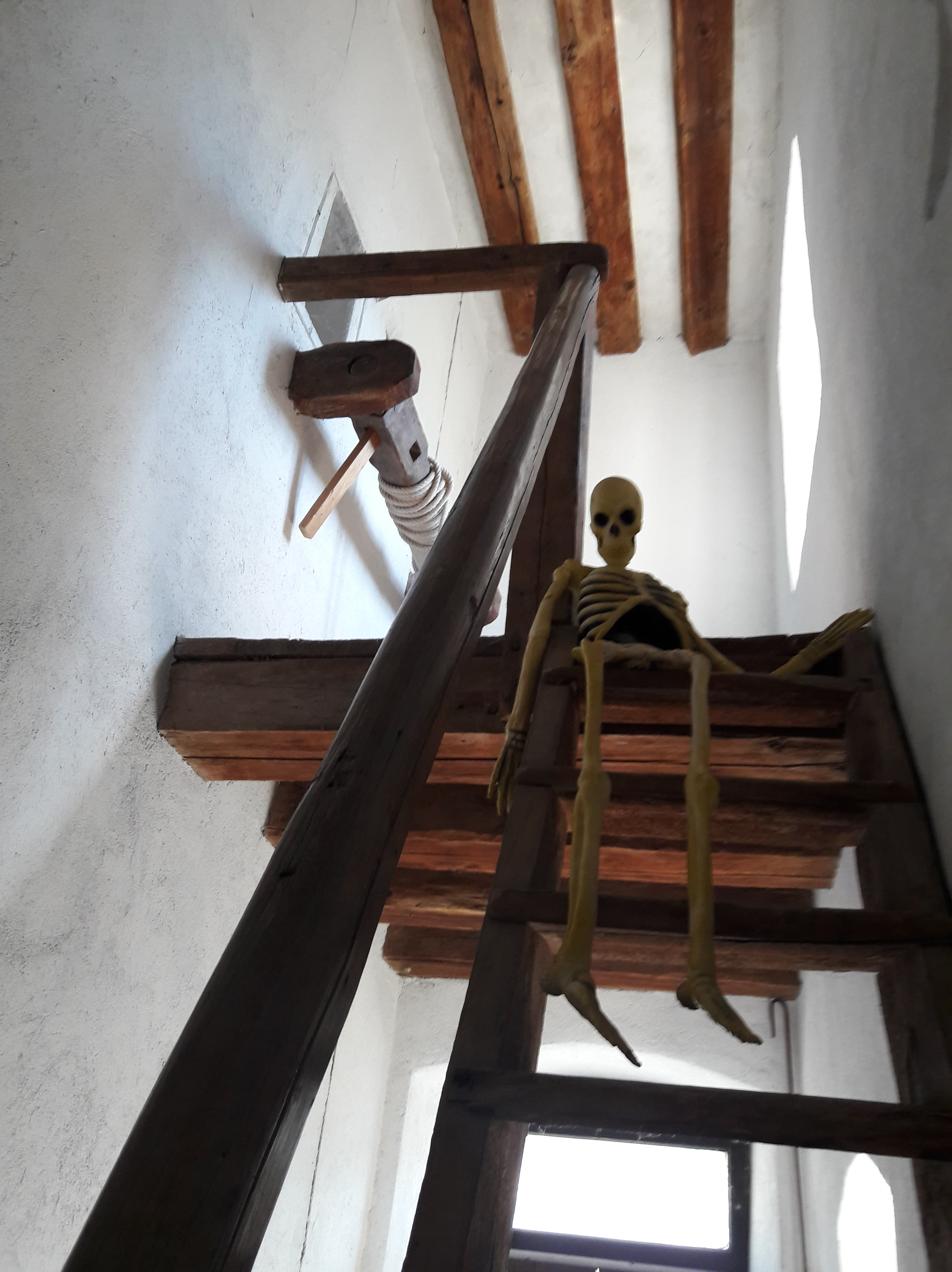
Estrapade instrument de torture

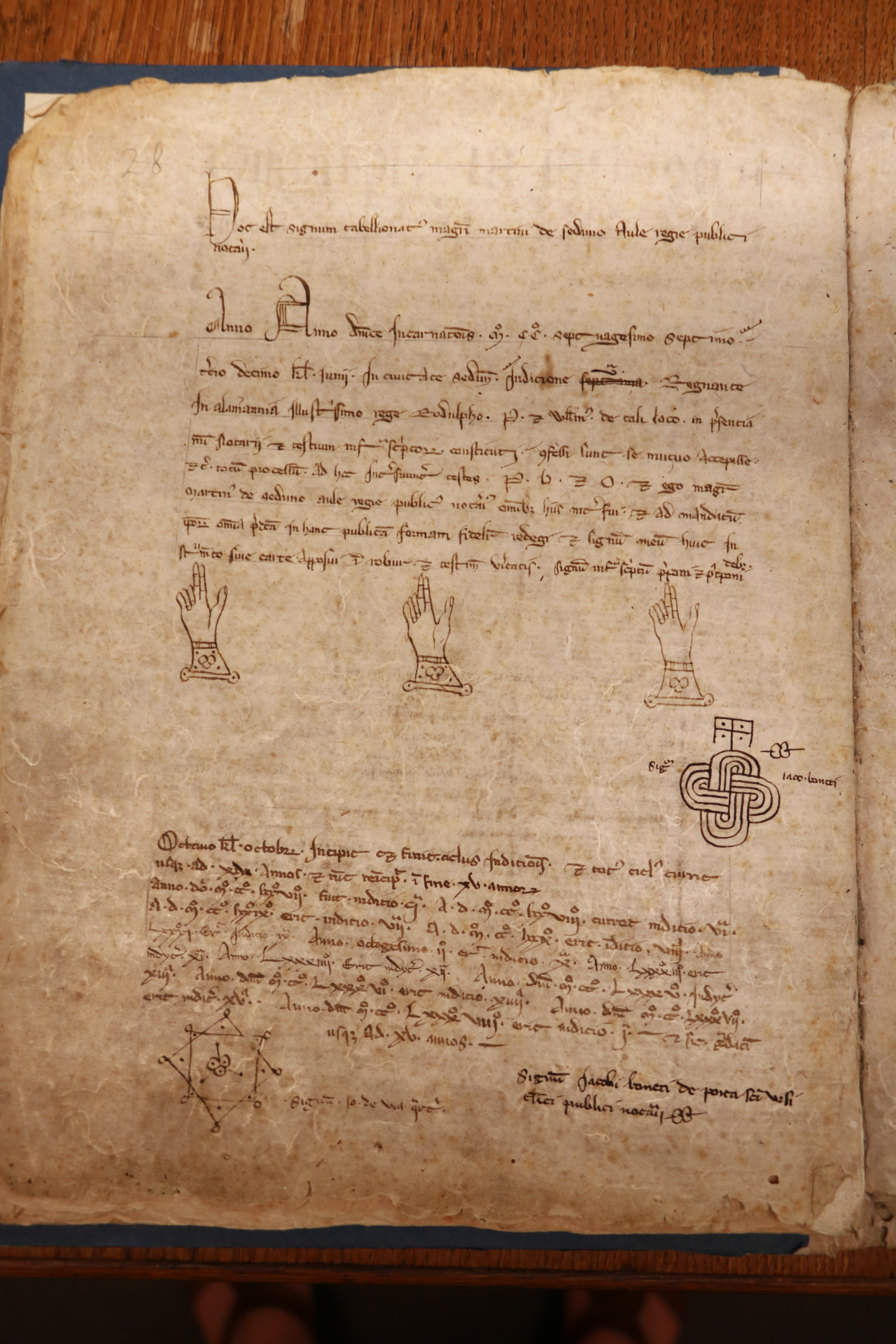
Acte notarié de l'archevêché cathédral de Sion 02

The Valais witch trials consisted of a witch-hunt and a series of witch trials which took place in the Valais (the House of Savoy and the prince-bishopric of Sion), today part of Switzerland, beginning in 1428. The Valais witch-hunt is the first of the systematic campaigns which would become much more widespread in the decades to come, initiating the period of witch trials in Europe.

The persecutions started in French-speaking Lower Valais (House of Savoy and prince-bishopric of Sion) and spread to German-speaking Upper Valais and to nearby valleys in the Western Alps. They subsided after six to eight years (c. 1434/6), but the phenomenon spread further afield from here, to Vaud, Fribourg, Neuchâtel, and beyond.

== History ==
Although occasional burning of witches (hexen) is recorded in Switzerland since the beginning of the 15th century, the Valais trials of 1428 are the first event in which the accusation of sorcery leads to systematic persecution with hundreds of victims executed.

The main contemporary account of the event is the short report by Johannes Fründ of Lucerne, written in c. 1430, possibly on the request of Christoph von Silenen, at the time castellan in Siders. It is extant in two versions, one in Lucerne (Zentralbibliothek BB 335, pp. 483-488), the other in Strasbourg (BNU Ms. 2. 935, ff. 162-164). The Lucerne version is older, and a probable autograph. This is the oldest known account of the incipient systematic witch-hunts of the 1430s to 1440s. A critical edition was published along with four other early texts on the topic by Ostorero et al. (1999).

The witch trials emerged before the background of the persecution of the Waldensians in Fribourg (1399–1430), due to which a functioning inquisition with a seat in Lausanne had been established. Additionally, the Valais was at the time politically fragmented, in the wake of the rebellion of 1415–1420 and the weakening of Savoyard rule in Vaud.

The events began in Val d'Anniviers (Enfis) and Val d'Hérens (Urens), the valleys south of Siders and Sion, respectively. Still, in the same year, the witch-hunt spread first throughout the French-speaking (walche) Lower Valais and then to the German-speaking (tutsche) Upper Valais.

By the summer of 1428, the entire Valais was affected. On 7 August, the authorities in Leuk issued a formal proclamation of the necessary procedures for a witch trial. According to this document, the "public talk or slander of three or four neighbours" was enough for arrest and imprisonment, even if the accused was a member of the nobility. The use of torture was reserved for victims "slandered by five, six, or seven or more persons, up to the number of ten, who were qualified to do so and not under suspicion themselves", but also those "accused by three persons who had been tried and sentenced to death for the practice of sorcery".

According to Fründ's account, the victims were accused of murder, heresy, and sorcery, being in pact with the devil. They were supposedly paying tribute to the devil, who appeared as a black animal such as a bear or a ram. The devil asked his followers to avoid holy mass and confession. Fründ relates that some of the accused were tortured to death without issuing a confession, while others did confess a variety of evil deeds, such as causing lameness, blindness, madness, miscarriage, impotence, infertility, and killing and eating their own children.

He also alludes to the topos of flying witches - saying that they would apply a salve to their chairs, and then ride the chairs wherever they wanted - and the Witches' Sabbath, saying that the witches would meet in people's cellars at night and drink their wine, and meeting to listen to anti-Christian sermons by the devil in the form of a schoolmaster, with a mock-confession of any good-deeds they might have done, which would gain much influence in the early modern period. He even reports some of them being werewolves, killing livestock in the shape of a wolf, and knowing the recipe of an invisibility potion. Others confessed to ruining crops (wine and grain) and causing livestock to give no milk and plowing teams to stand still.

The trials continued for several years more, well into the 1430s. The number of victims is unknown, but ranges in the hundreds. Fründ speaks of a conspiracy of "700" witches of which "more than 200" had been burned two years into the trials (c. 1430). Contrary to the later phase of the European witch-trials, when the majority of those accused were women, the victims in the Valais witch trials are estimated to have been two-thirds male and one-third female.

== Reception and influence ==
After the witch trials had subsided in Valais and Savoy, the phenomenon spread further in the decades leading up to the Reformation, to Fribourg and Neuchâtel (1440), Vevey (1448), the bishopric of Lausanne and Lake Geneva area (c. 1460–1480) and Dommartin (1498, 1524–1528).

The influence of the Valais on the much larger phenomenon of the witch trials in the early modern period, lasting throughout the 16th and 17th centuries in much of Western Europe, may have been amplified by the Council of Basel which took place during the same period, during 1431–1437.

Here, theologians discussed the evidence for the new phenomenon of witchcraft and collected the court proceedings from the Valais, Vaud, and Savoy region. These documents were perused by the first generation of authors on witchcraft, such as Johannes Nider, the author of Formicarius (written 1436–1438).

== See also ==
- Catherine Quicquat

== Bibliography ==
- M. Ostorero et al., L'imaginaire du sabbat. Edition critique des textes les plus anciens (1430 c. -1440 c.), Cahiers Lausannois d'Histoire Médiévale 26 (1999).
- Eva Kärfve (1992). Den stora ondskan i Valais: den första häxförföljelsen i Europa (The Great Evil of Valais). Stehag: B. Östlings bokförlag Symposion.
- G. Modestin, "«Von den hexen, so in Wallis verbrant wurdent» Eine wieder entdeckte Handschrift mit dem Bericht des Chronisten Hans Fründ über eine Hexenverfolgung im Wallis (1428)", Vallesia 60 (2005), 404-409.
- P. G. Maxwell-Stuart: Witch Beliefs and Witch Trials in the Middle Ages: Documents and Readings (2011), "Pope Eugenius rails against Amadeus, Duke of Savoy, as a protector of and a consorter with witches, 1440", p. 31; "The activities and subsequent persecution of sorcerers, fortune tellers and similar workers of magic in the bilingual territory of Valais (Wallis), 1428-1434", pp. 182-188.
