= Bedburg =

- Town
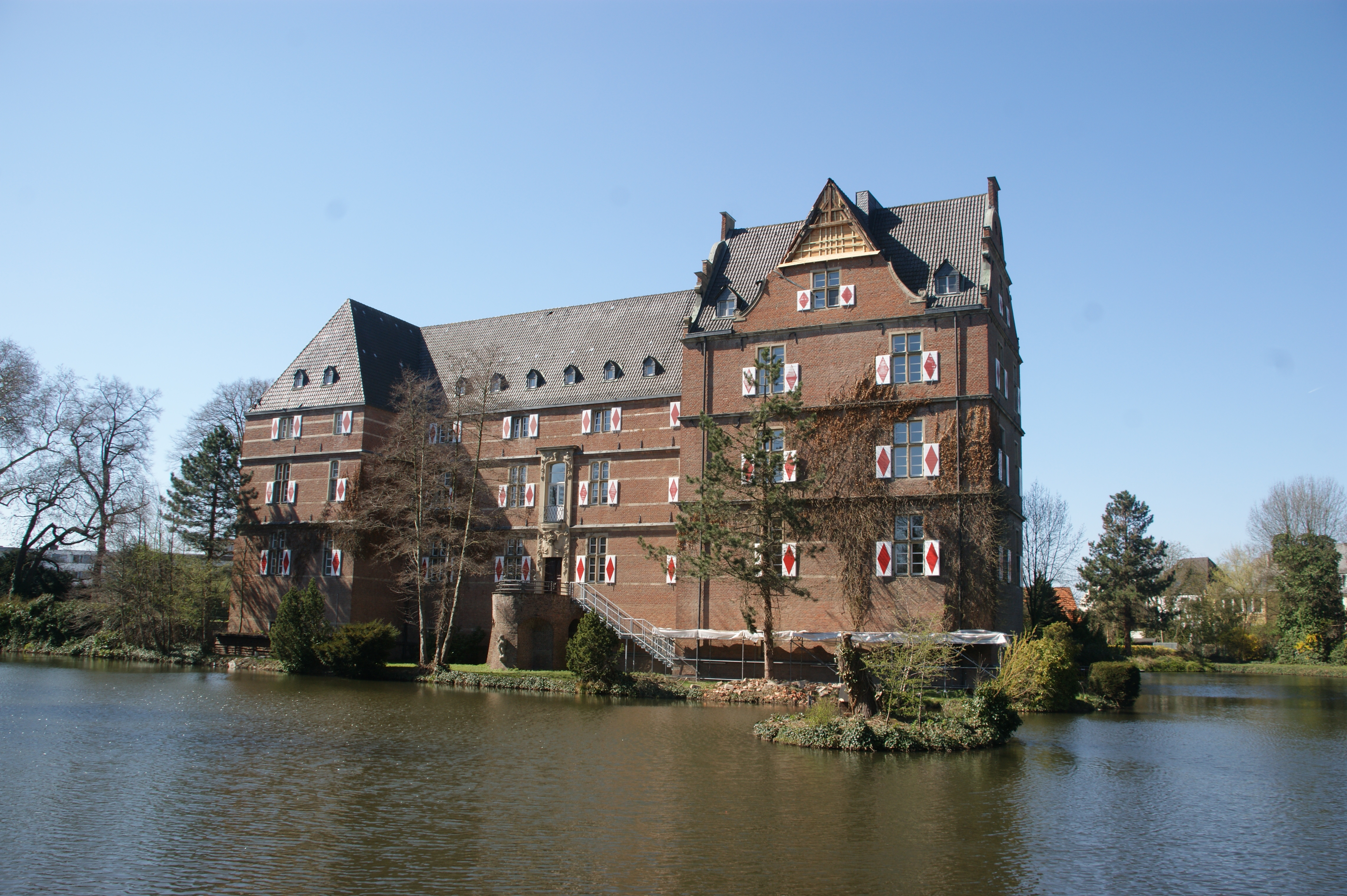
- Castle

- Coat of arms

- Location of Bedburg within Rhein-Erft-Kreis district
- Interactive map of Bedburg
- Location within Germany Location within North Rhine-Westphalia
- Coordinates: 51°00′00″N 6°33′45″E
- Country: Germany
- State: North Rhine-Westphalia
- Admin. region: Köln
- District: Rhein-Erft-Kreis

Government
  - Mayor (2025–30): Sascha Solbach (SPD)

Area
  - Total: 80.42 km^{2} (31.05 sq mi)
- Elevation: 70 m (230 ft)

Population (2025-12-31)
  - Total: 25,210
  - Density: 313.5/km^{2} (811.9/sq mi)
- Time zone: UTC+01:00 (CET)
  - Summer (DST): UTC+02:00 (CEST)
- Postal codes: 50181
- Dialling codes: 02272
- Vehicle registration: BM
- Website: www.bedburg.de

Bedburg (German pronunciation: [ˈbɛtbʊʁk]) is a town in the Rhein-Erft-Kreis, North Rhine-Westphalia of Germany with 25,000 residents. Since 2014, Sascha Solbach is the mayor of Bedburg. The town is documented as existing as early as 893.

== Climate ==
Bedburg

Climate chart (precipitation, max. and min. temperature)
J	F	M	A	M	J	J	A	S	O	N	D
0 1 −3	0 4 −2	0 9 0	0 15 5	0 22 10	0 23 12	0 25 14	0 25 15	0 20 9	0 14 7	0 8 3	0 1 −3
- █ Average max. and min. temperatures in °C
- █ Precipitation totals in mm
- Source: Note: rainfall data was not available
Imperial conversion
J	F	M	A	M	J	J	A	S	O	N	D
0 34 27	0 39 28	0 48 32	0 59 41	0 72 50	0 73 54	0 77 57	0 77 59	0 68 48	0 57 45	0 46 37	0 34 27
- █ Average max. and min. temperatures in °F
- █ Precipitation totals in inches

== Population ==
Historical population

Year	Pop.	±% p.a.
1965	19,462	—
1970	19,545	+0.09%
1975	18,718	−0.86%
1980	18,781	+0.07%
1985	19,774	+1.04%
1990	21,524	+1.71%
1995	23,219	+1.53%

Year	Pop.	±% p.a.
2000	24,237	+0.86%
2005	24,937	+0.57%
2010	24,647	−0.23%
2015	23,334	−1.09%
2020	23,743	+0.35%
2025	25,210	+1.21%

Source: Landesdatabank Nordrhein-Westfalen

== Politics ==
The current mayor of Bedburg is Sascha Solbach of the SPD, who has been serving as mayor since 2014. In the 2025 local elections he was reelected with 64,57 % of the vote.

=== City council ===
After the 2025 local elections, the Bedburg city council is composed as follows:

Party	Votes	%	+/-	Seats	+/-
Social Democratic Party (SPD)	5,110	39.2	▼2.4	15	±0
Christian Democratic Union (CDU)	3,940	30.2	▼3.8	11	▼1
Alternative for Germany (AfD)	1,822	14.0	New	5	New
Free Voters' Society Bedburg (FWG)	906	7.0	▼6.6	3	▼2
Alliance 90/The Greens (Grüne)	520	4.0	▼3.2	2	▼1
Die Linke (Linke)	312	2.4	New	1	New
Free Democratic Party (FDP)	311	2.4	▼1.3	1	±0
Independent W. Merx	64	0.5	New	0	New
Independent S. Merx	53	0.4	New	0	New
Valid votes	13,038	98.3			
Invalid votes	230	1.7			
Total	13,268	100.0		38	▲2
Electorate/voter turnout	20,159	65.8			
Source: City of Bedburg

== Notable people ==
=== Sons and daughters ===
- Arnold von Harff (1471–1505), knight and adventurer
- Katharina Molitor (born 1983), javelin thrower and volleyball player

=== People with connection to Bedburg ===
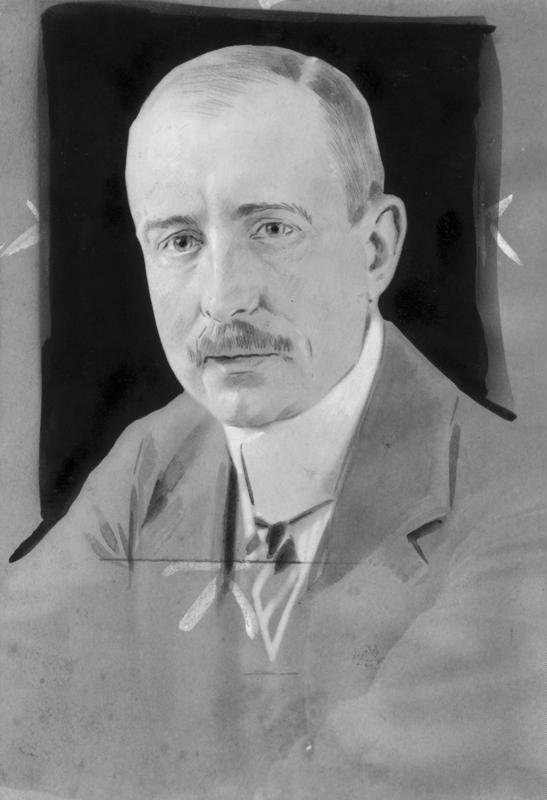
Wilhelm von Mirbach-Harff in 1917

- Wilhelm von Mirbach-Harff (1871–1918), German diplomat and ambassador; lived in Bedburg and did his Abitur there
- Peter Stumpp (c. 1525–1589), 16th Century possible serial killer known as "The Werewolf of Bedburg"
