= Perchtenlaufen =

Folk tradition of Austria

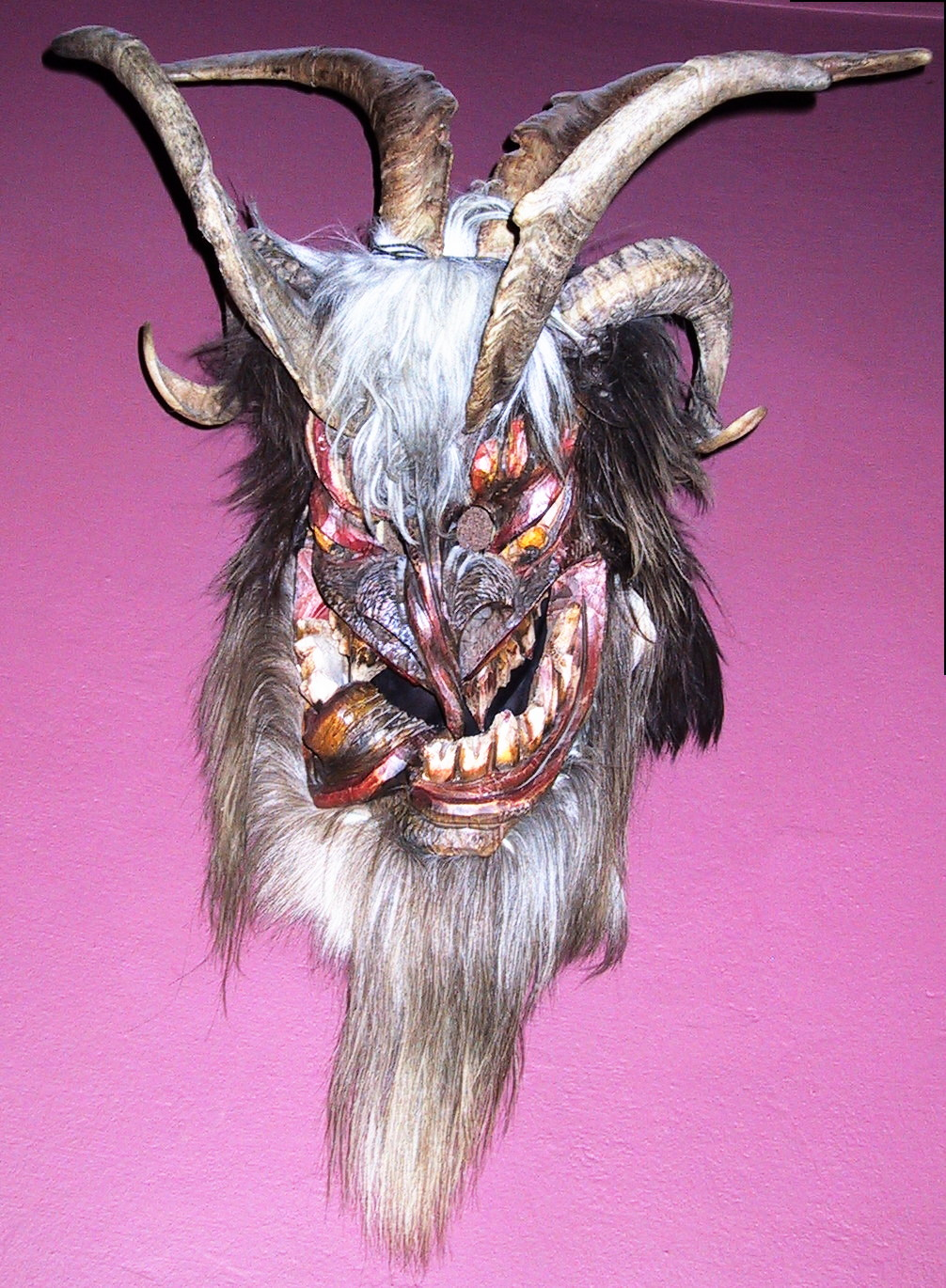
A perchten mask from Salzburg in Austria

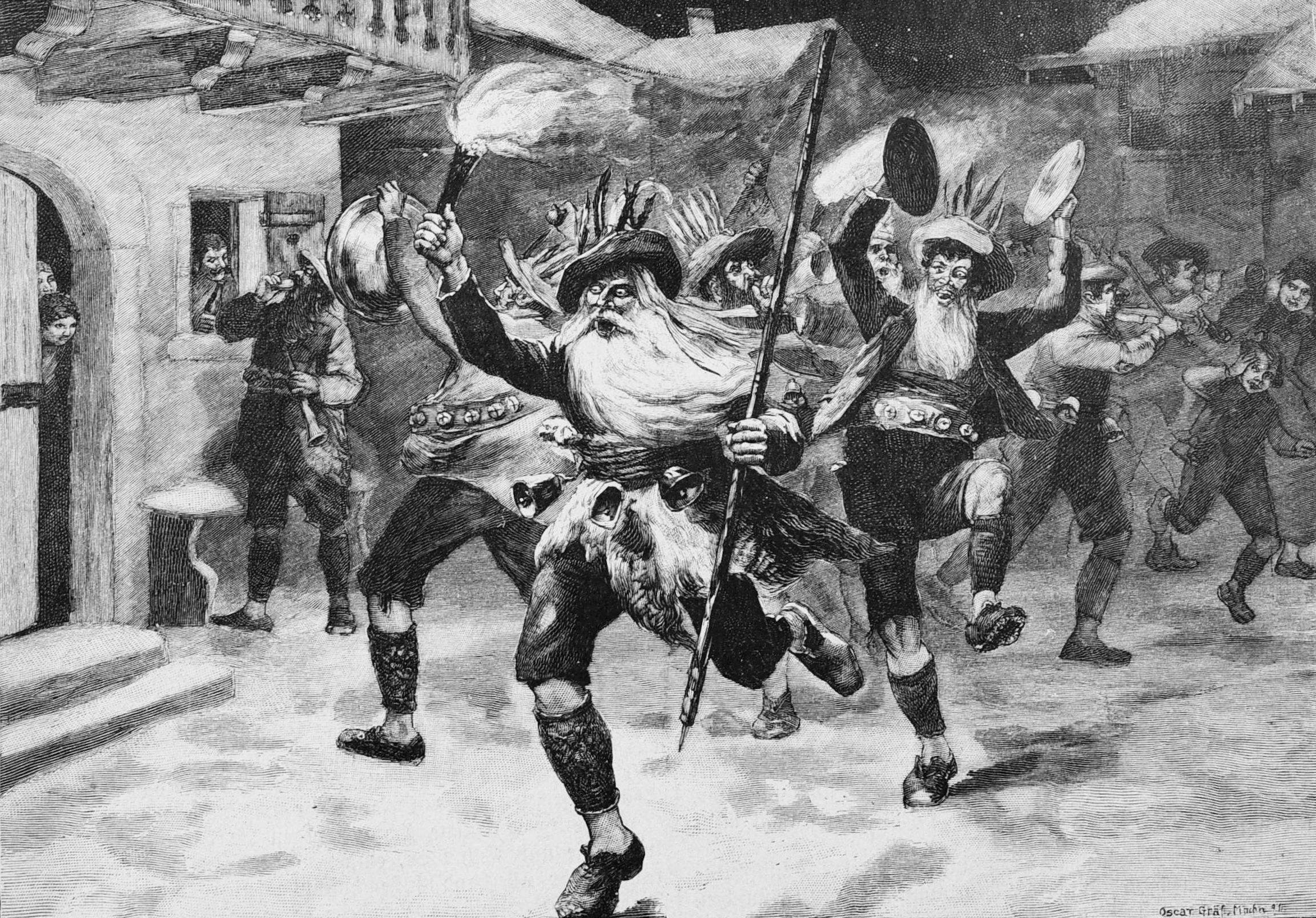
Perchtenlaufen in Salzburg, Austria, 1892

Perchtenlaufen is a folk custom found in some Austrian as well as South Tyrolian regions. Occurring on set occasions, the ceremony involves two groups of locals fighting against one another, using wooden canes and sticks. Both groups are masked, one as "beautiful" and the other as "ugly" Perchte.

== Activity ==
People would masquerade as a devilish figure known as Percht, a two-legged humanoid goat with a giraffe-like neck, wearing animal furs. People wore costumes and marched in processions known as Perchtenlaufen. The Perchtenlaufen were looked at with suspicion by the Catholic Church and banned by some civil authorities. Due to sparse population and rugged environments within the Alpine region, the ban was not effective or easily enforced, rendering the ban useless.

In the state of Styria, Southeastern Austria, all of the Perchtln were played by women right into the 19th century. As a part of this, they blackened their faces, wore their hair long and sometimes exposed their breasts. In the mid-20th century, one old woman was recorded as saying that when she was young she remembered seeing a female Perchtln from the Styrian municipality of Donnersbach who carried a swaddled baby. She related that many of the women dressed as Perchtln would let one breast hang out, but that they were so well disguised that "no one needed to be ashamed."

In January 1977, the German anthropologist Hans Peter Duerr attended the Perchtenlaufen in Styria, noting that by that time there were no more female Perchtln, with youths instead having taken up all of those roles.

== Interpretations ==
The Italian historian Carlo Ginzburg made reference to the perchtenlaufen in his book The Night Battles: Witchcraft and Agrarian Cults in the Sixteenth and Seventeenth Centuries (1966, English translation 1983). He noted similarities between the perchtenlaufen and the benandanti, a visionary tradition which existed in Early Modern Friuli, a province in Northeastern Italy, which was the primary focus of The Night Battles. He remarked that the perchtenlaufen was "undoubtedly a remnant of the ancient ritual battles" which he believed had originally been based around the fertility of the crops.

Ginzburg's comparison between the perchtenlaufenand the benandanti was adopted by the German anthropologist Hans Peter Duerr in his book Dreamtime: Concerning the Boundary between Wilderness and Civilization (1978, English translation 1985). He also compared it to the case of the Livonian werewolf, arguing that they all represent a clash between the forces of order and chaos.

== See also ==
- Krampuslauf
