= Dog of God =

2025 Latvian animated film

- International release poster
- Directed by: Lauris Ābele; Raitis Ābele
- Written by: Lauris Ābele; Raitis Ābele; Ivo Briedis; Harijs Grundmanis
- Produced by: Kristele Pudane; Giovanni Labadessa
- Starring: Regnārs Vaivars; Einars Repše; Kristians Kareļins
- Cinematography: Mārcis Ābele
- Edited by: Lauris Ābele; Raitis Ābele
- Music by: Lauris Ābele
- Production companies: Tritone Studio; Lumiere Lab
- Distributed by: Media Move
- Release dates: June 6, 2025 (Tribeca); September 2, 2025 (Latvia)
- Running time: 92 minutes
- Countries: Latvia; United States
- Languages: Latvian; German
- Budget: €720,000

Dog of God (Latvian: Dieva suns) is a 2025 adult animated comedy horror film co-written, edited and directed by Lauris and Raitis Ābele. Based on the true story of Thiess of Kaltenbrun, a man convicted of heresy who calls himself a werewolf, the film is a joint Latvian-American co-production starring Regnārs Vaivars, Einars Repše and Kristians Kareļins.

Dog of God had its world premiere at the 24th Tribeca Film Festival on June 6, 2025, in the Escape from Tribeca section. It was selected as the Latvian entry for the Best International Feature Film at the 98th Academy Awards, but it was not nominated.

== Synopsis ==
In the 17th-century Livonian village of Zaube, the shepherd sends the maid to trial for witchcraft. There, a man named Thiess (Tīss) proclaims himself a werewolf, one with roots in Latvian folklore, close to a demented shaman. The moment this tension reaches its peak will forever change the village and its surviving inhabitants.

== Cast ==
The actors participating in this film are:

- Regnārs Vaivars as Buchholtz
- Einars Repše as Thiess (Tīss)
- Jurģis Spulenieks as Klibis
- Agate Krista as Nēze
- Kristians Kareļins
- Armands Berģis

== Production ==
Principal photography took place between 2022 and 2023 at the Riga School of Media and Arts studio in Latvia.

== Release ==
Dog of God had its world premiere on June 6, 2025, at the 24th Tribeca Film Festival in the Escape from Tribeca section, then screened on July 21, 2025, at the 29th Fantasia International Film Festival, on August 7, 2025, at the Octopus Film Festival, and on August 22, 2025, at the FrightFest. ESC Films acquired the French theatrical rights.

The film had a limited theatrical release on September 2, 2025, in Latvian theaters through Cinamon, before expanding nationwide on October 16.

== Reception ==
On the review aggregator website Rotten Tomatoes, the film holds an approval rating of 88% based on 24 reviews, with an average rating of 7.9/10. The website's critical consensus states: "Dog of God blends intense violence, dark humor, and provocative sexuality to deliver a uniquely expressive exploration of sin, religion, and human behavior that's as provocative as it is unforgettable".

== See also ==
- List of submissions to the 98th Academy Awards for Best International Feature Film
- List of Latvian submissions for the Academy Award for Best International Feature Film
