= Dreamtime (book) =

1978 book by Hans Peter Duerr

Dreamtime: Concerning the Boundary between Wilderness and Civilization
- Cover of the first edition, featuring a reproduction of Paul Delvaux's 1940 painting L'Homme de la Rue
- Author: Hans Peter Duerr
- Original title: Traumzeit: Über die Grenze zwischen Wildnis und Zivilisation
- Translator: Felicitas Goodman
- Language: German
- Subjects: Ethnopsychology, Folklore, Cultural anthropology
- Publisher: Syndikat Autoren-und Verlagsgesellschaft, Basil Blackwell
- Publication date: 1978
- Publication place: West Germany
- English publication date: 1985
- Media type: Print (Hardback and paperback)
- Pages: 462 pp.
- ISBN: 0-631-13375-5
- OCLC: 10923631

Dreamtime: Concerning the Boundary between Wilderness and Civilization is an anthropological and philosophical study of the altered states of consciousness found in shamanism and European witchcraft written by German anthropologist Hans Peter Duerr. First published in 1978 by Syndikat Autoren-und Verlagsgesellschaft under the German title of Traumzeit: Über die Grenze zwischen Wildnis und Zivilisation, it was translated into English by the Hungarian-American anthropologist Felicitas Goodman and published by Basil Blackwell in 1985.

Dreamtime opens with the premise that many of those accused of witchcraft in early modern Christendom had been undergoing visionary journeys with the aid of a hallucinogenic salve which was suppressed by the Christian authorities. Duerr argues that this salve had been a part of the nocturnal visionary traditions associated with the goddess Diana, and he attempts to trace their origins back to the ancient world, before looking at goddesses associated with the wilderness and arguing that in various goddess-centred cultures, the cave represented a symbolic vagina and was used for birth rituals.

Later in the book, Duerr looks at ethnographic examples of shamanism, focusing on the shamanic use of hallucinogens and the experiences which such entheogens induce. He argues that "archaic cultures" recognize that a human can only truly understand themselves if they go to the mental boundary between "civilization" and "wilderness", and that it is this altered state of consciousness which both the shaman and the European witch reached in their visionary journeys. Believing that the modern western worldview failed to understand this process, Duerr criticizes the work of those anthropologists and scientists who had tried to understand "archaic" society through a western rationalist framework, instead advocating a return to "archaic" modes of thought.

Dreamtime was a controversial best-seller upon its initial release in West Germany, and inspired academic debate leading to the publication of Der Gläserne Zaun (1983), an anthology discussing Duerr's ideas, edited by Rolf Gehlen and Bernd Wolf. Reviews in the Anglophone world were mixed, with critics describing Dreamtime as unoriginal, factually inaccurate, and difficult to read, but also innovative and well referenced.

== Background ==
According to his own account, the idea for writing Dreamtime first came to Duerr when he was in New Mexico in the summer of 1963. He had spent the day visiting the Puye Cliff Dwellings and was returning to the Albuquerque Greyhound Bus Station, where he met a Tewa Native yerbatero (herbalist) buying a cup of coffee, and struck up a conversation. Duerr asked the yerbatero if he could help him find a Native family living in one of the pueblos north of Santa Fe with whom he could stay, to conduct anthropological research into the nightly dances that took place in the subterranean kivas. The Native told him that if he wanted to find out about the dances in the kivas, then he should go to the Pueblo of Our Lady of the Angels and study at the University of California. Duerr would later relate that this blow to his vanity first provided him with the idea of writing Dreamtime.

Duerr presented some of his ideas in a lecture given to the members of a philosophy seminar at the University of Constance in the autumn of 1975, which he repeated at a housewives' club in Mannheim. He was "greatly encouraged" in his preparation for the work by the noted English anthropologist E. E. Evans-Pritchard (1902–1973), who died before its publication.

The anthropologist Rik Pinxten noted that Dreamtime was published at a time of new advancements in German anthropology. After a period of intellectual stagnation during the preceding decades, the 1970s saw the rising popularity of the discipline, with a dramatic increase in the number of students enrolling to study ethnography at West German universities. It also saw increasing interdisciplinary collaboration between anthropologists and philosophers, with several scholars arguing that ethnography was relevant to "philosophical analysis". This increase in philosophical discussion within German anthropology was largely rejected by the "official academic representatives" of the discipline, who believed that it exceeded the "limits of scientific respectability", but it was nonetheless adopted by Duerr in Dreamtime.

== Publication ==
"Dreamtime served as a charter for a generation which found society repressive and which sought to escape it by a) physically leaving it, b) cultivating a higher consciousness which could transcend it, or c) getting so stoned that one either did not notice what was bad or else was not troubled by it. In Dreamtime, Duerr urges us to look to archaic societies to see people who are truly happy and at one with themselves, largely, it seems, because they are able to trip out whenever they like."

— Charles Stewart, 1987.

When the book was first published in West Germany in 1978, it sold hundreds of thousands of copies, becoming a bestseller and arousing both popular and academic interest. According to the American Indologist Wendy Doniger O'Flaherty, Dreamtime became "the canon of a cult for intellectual former hippies", dealing as it did with issues such as "drugs, sex, anarchy, [and] lurid religions". British anthropologist Charles Stewart noted that it was popular among members of the alternativer German subculture, and for this reason believed that the book could tell anthropologists "a considerable amount about the strivings of modern German society".

The book was translated into English by Felicitas D. Goodman (1914–2005), a Hungarian-born American anthropologist who had written several books of her own on the subject of religious trance journeys. Duerr noted that of all the translators he had worked with, Goodman showed the greatest dedication to her work. For the English-language translation, Duerr included a new preface, in which he noted that he had refused to make changes to the original text despite the insistence of the publisher. Explaining his reasoning, he remarked that "a book is not a dishwasher, where it is advisable to change malfunctioning parts." He accepted that the book had faults, and expressed his hope that the reader would forgive him for leaving them intact in the English translation. In the English-language edition, the main text takes up the first 133 pages of the book, while the footnotes and bibliography occupy the next 324 pages.

== Synopsis and arguments ==
"[W]hy should there be so little mention in the court records of these salves, some of them hallucinogenic? How could the ingredients of these oils and ointments have escaped the probing questions of the judges and inquisitors?... [A]s we know from a number of contemporary observers, there must indeed have been people, mainly women, during the time of the Renaissance and in isolated incidents even later, who fell into a stupor with the aid of certain salves. After coming to, they proceeded to tell of flights, frequently strenuous, and of orgiastic dances. Why then should the trial documents be silent about such eye-witness accounts and about the ingredients of the ointments and oils?."

— Hans Peter Duerr, 1985 [1978].

Duerr examines the use of flying ointment in early modern witchcraft and draws ethnographic parallels from accused witches among the Shona people of Rhodesia and witchcraft beliefs of the Normanby Archipelago in the South Pacific. He concludes that some of those accused of witchcraft in early modern Europe had applied hallucinogenic ointments to their skin to make themselves believe that they were flying to the so-called Witches' Sabbat, a ritual gathering of witches. Noting the apparent lack of recipes for this salve in the witch trial records, Duerr posits the view that the Christian authorities intentionally covered up the existence of hallucinogenic ointments, fearing that their existence would cast doubt on various aspects of the witches' accounts, including their alleged encounters with the Devil. Duerr maintains that this knowledge might have ultimately led people to cast doubt on even the Devil, a key aspect of early modern Christian cosmology. Although the use of hallucinogenic ointments was not a factor in every witch trial, it was more prevalent in the earlier trials of the Alpine region. Duerr connects its use to the nocturnal visionary traditions associated with the goddess Diana in that region.

Duerr then looks into the origins of the nocturnal visionary traditions, beginning with the ancient Greek deity Artemis and her influence on the Roman goddess Diana. In Alpine lore, Diana survived Christianization as the leader of the nocturnal procession. Duerr goes further back into the Palaeolithic, where Venus figurines are interpreted as a "prototype" for the later Greek Artemis, a goddess who was "the unrestrained mistress of animals and plants". Duerr then describes the relationship between ancient goddesses and caves as a symbol of the female vagina and explores stories involving caves in Greek mythology, Sir Gawain and the Green Knight and Yakut folklore. Duerr proposes that the association between caves and the vagina is global in scope, as societies around the world use caves in rituals symbolizing birth.

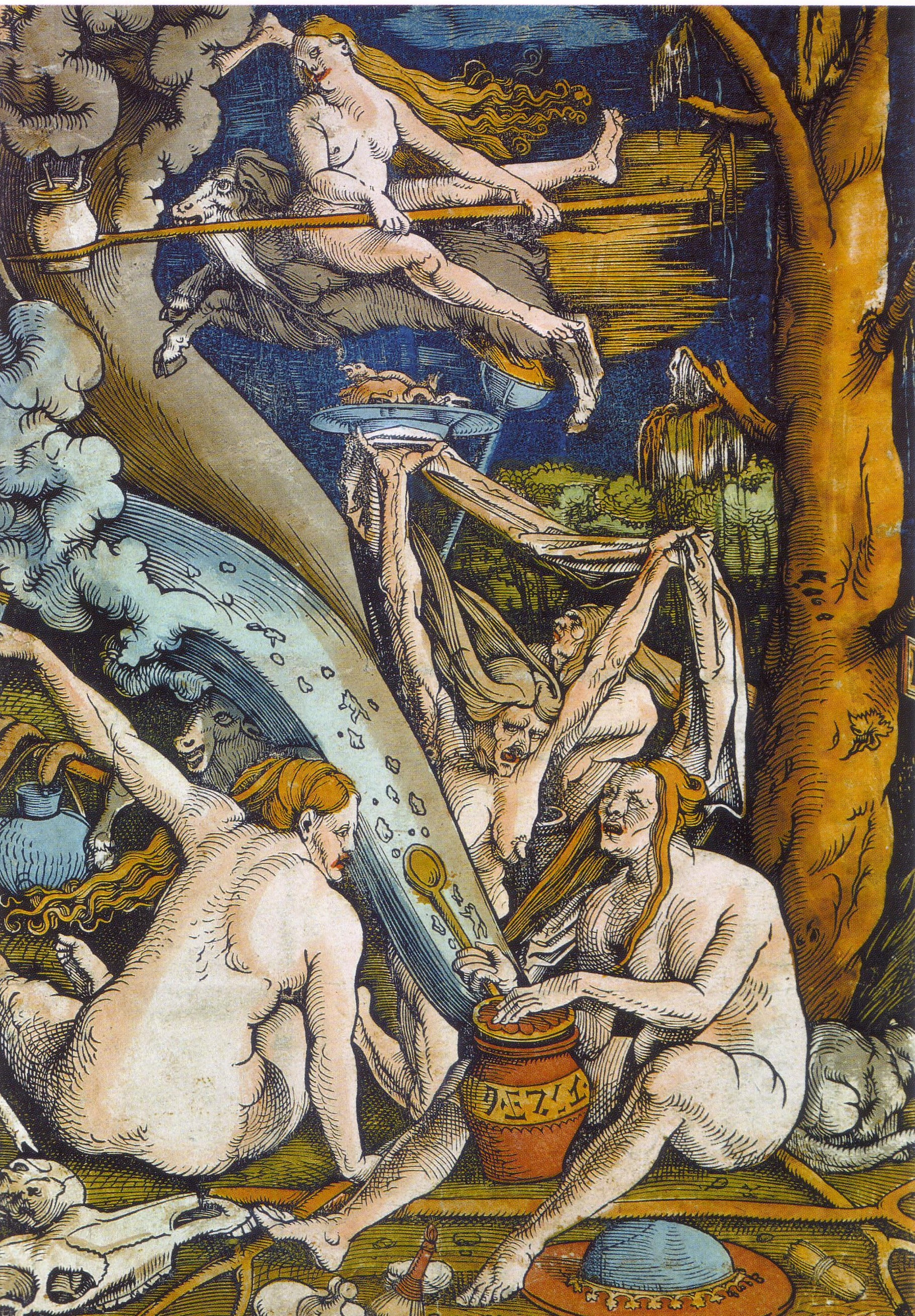
A woodcut depicting a Witches' Sabbat, produced by Hans Baldung Grien in 1508. Duerr included it as the tenth plate in Dreamtime, in the midst of a chapter discussing the European witch.

Various folk traditions across Europe are analyzed, such as the Alpine Perchtenlaufen, where women broke social conventions by attacking men or engaging in lesbianism. Duerr compares these traditions to the benandanti of early modern Friuli, and to the Livonian werewolf, viewing them as representing the clash between order and chaos. Christian society in the Late Middle Ages began to construe the witch as a creature inside of society rather than outside it, which partly led to the witch trials of the early modern period. Duerr argues that the societies of European Christendom began to increasingly accept female nudity in art and fashion during the Late Middle Ages.

Examples in the historical European folk tradition where criminals have been declared to be outside of the law and banished from the community are illustrated. Duerr connects these outsiders to executioners and warriors who were also outside the law because they had entered the world of the dead. Similarly, the witches of the early modern period also left the everyday world, and like the shamans of Siberia experienced their "wild" or "animal aspect" in order to understand their human side. Duerr uses ethnographic examples from around the world to show that many cultures have used hallucinogenic substances to reach states of consciousness beyond ordinary societal boundaries.

Duerr provides additional ethnographic examples showing how societal rules were reversed at special times of the year. In shamanic terms, societies which espouse an "archaic mentality" understand who they are by understanding who they are not; according to Duerr, modern societies fail to understand this concept. Datura, a plant that contains toxic hallucinogens is discussed. The plant was introduced to Europe in the early modern period. Among the Huichol people of central Mexico, shamans have told anthropologists that Datura is used by malevolent witches. Duerr makes note of the anthropologists who have undertaken shamanic experiences with the people they are studying, such as Barbara Myerhoff and Carlos Castenada, but argues that such ethnographers have failed to truly understand what shamans mean when they describe their experiences as "flying". In Duerr's view, shamans learn to evaporate their "ego boundaries", thereby experiencing themselves in a different way; it is this feeling that can be described as shamanic flying. Duerr ties these shamanic practices into the werewolves of early modern Europe, arguing that these werewolves did not physically transform into wolves, but that they embraced their "wolf nature" by crossing over the boundary from "civilisation" to "wilderness".

Duerr then offers a philosophical discussion on the nature of reality, criticizing psychiatrists like George Devereux for their beliefs that shamans were mentally ill. Instead he champions the idea that the visionary experiences of shamans should be treated as real rather than illusionary, drawing from the ideas of the philosopher Ludwig Wittgenstein to support his argument. The author then examines the role of animals in shamanic visions, paying particular reference to the experiences of the Peruvian anthropologist Carlos Castaneda. Duerr argues that the conversations between the animal and the individual undertaking the vision are neither literal nor delusional, but that the only way to understand this is to situate oneself "on the fence", between the worlds of civilisation and wilderness.

"The 'dream place' is everywhere and nowhere, just like the 'dreamtime' is always and never. You might say that the term 'dream place' does not refer to any particular place and the way to get to it is to get nowhere."

— Hans Peter Duerr, 1985 [1978].

Duerr argues that modern Western society lacks important facets found in "archaic" societies who adhere to shamanic beliefs, and he asserts that the majority of Western anthropologists who have performed ethnographic fieldwork in these cultures have failed to truly understand them. To correct this, Duerr argues that anthropologists must understand that people in such societies take a "mythic perspective" to the world, often comparing objects and places in the material world to objects and places that exist "outside of time", in the eternal realm of mythology. He connects this with the Indigenous Australian concept of Dreamtime, an otherworld outside of ordinary space and time.

Finally, Duerr once again criticises the approach of Western society and its anthropologists to studying "archaic" spiritual beliefs. He asserts that in these "archaic" cultures, people "have a much clearer idea about the fact that we can not be only what we are if at the same time, we are also what we are not, and that we can only know who we are if we experience our boundaries". He denounces Western scientists and anthropologists for their approaches to the study of such cultures, arguing that they have misrepresented them by attempting to fit them within the Western ideas of objectivity. He argues that in future, anthropologists must reach their own boundaries, and recognize the wilderness of their consciousness before they can truly understand the worldview of "archaic" humans.

== Reception ==
=== Academic reviews ===
Writing in The Journal of Religion, Gail Hinich claimed that Duerr's Dreamtime had a "maverick whimsy and passion" that stemmed from its argument that Western society had unfairly forced the "otherworld" into "an autistic tyranny of the self". On a critical note, Hinich believed that despite Duerr's extensive bibliography, he had failed to understand the "critical context in which the intellectual history of the demonized outsider continues to be examined", ignoring the ideas put forward by Edward Dudley and Maximilian Novack in their edited volume The Wild Man Within (1972) or John Block Friedman in his The Monstrous Races in Medieval Art and Thought (1981). In a review published in the journal Forest & Conservation History, Paul Fayter praised Dreamtime, considering it to be a "groundbreaking ethnographic study" that invites the reader to consider what Western society has lost in its over-reliance on science and rationalism. Fayter also commented positively on Goodman's translation, noting that she had successfully conveyed Duerr's dry humour and self-deprecating wit.

"The book remains a groundbreaking ethnographic study that ranges from old Norse sagas to aboriginal initiation rites, from the life of Jesus to fertility-cult practices, shamanism to politics, ethnopharmacology to psychopathology, comparative religion to philosophy of science, witches to werewolves and back again."

— Paul Fayter's review of Dreamtime, 1990.

Joseph J. Valadez of the Harvard School of Public Health reviewed Duerr's Dreamtime for the journal Contemporary Sociology. He felt that the book had brought him to the "edges of [his] own logics", but that this had not been the result of any intellectual argument posed by Duerr; indeed, he suggested that there were "crucial scholarly weaknesses" that made much of Duerr's argument suspect. He ultimately felt that because Duerr had refused to correct his factual mistakes for the English translation, the book had left the realms of scholarship and instead become an "obscure cultural artifact", one which was "represented by the myriad descriptions of cryptic symbols" that are discussed within its pages. Going on to comment on Duerr's main argument regarding the relationship between Wilderness and Civilization, Valadez also expressed his opinion that Duerr had made a "fundamental error" in assuming that Wilderness is not accessible to everyone "by virtue of genetic heritage."

In the Comparative Civilizations Review journal, Anthony M. Stevens-Arroyo proclaimed that it was easy "to get lost" in Dreamtime, believing that the multitude of ethnographic and historical facts presented by Duerr often distracted from the book's main arguments. Although praising the book's contents, Stevens-Arroyo expressed his annoyance at Duerr's use of humour, believing that it was inappropriate in such a serious work of scholarship. He also remarked that Duerr "practices what he preaches", noting that the book was something of an apologia for his involvement in the counter-cultural and drug subcultures of the 1960s and his continuing advocacy of the use of mind-altering substances, in the same style as Timothy Leary. Considering the work to be an attack on social convention, he believes that Duerr has made use of mind-altering drugs to cross boundaries into altered states of consciousness and that Dreamtime is his invitation for others to join him. Stevens-Arroyo did praise Goodman's English translation, but argued that the index was too limited.

In a commentary piece for the Journal of the Anthropological Society of Oxford, Charles Stewart expressed his opinion that Dreamtime is best described as "the sort of book that Carlos Castaneda might have written if he were a German philosopher." He identifies a series of commonalities between Duerr's work and Castenada's, claiming that Duerr's description of his encounter with the Native American yerbatero in the book's preface is an "allusion" to Castenada's meeting with Don Juan Matus, which he described in The Teachings of Don Juan (1968). Praising Duerr's use of source material, Stewart notes that many anthropologists would be critical of using ethnographic data to "construct a moral parable" for Western society, and he went on to question whether it was really necessary for Westerners to return to "archaic" modes of thought.

=== Press reviews ===
"The text licks its chops when describing orgies and drug trips and nightmares, but the footnotes confront the thorniest problems of epistemology and cultural relativism – name-dropping the principal inventors of these problems rather than seriously grappling with the problems so that readers who are not already familiar with the arguments mentioned in the notes will be totally bewildered by them."

— Wendy Doniger O'Flaherty's review of Dreamtime, 1985.

The American Indologist Wendy Doniger O'Flaherty of the University of Chicago published a review of Duerr's Dreamtime in The New York Times. She expressed her opinion that Duerr had put forward a "bold hypothesis" but that Dreamtime was a "paradigm of borderline academia", consisting of chapter titles written with "charm and wit" that hid "a mountainous scholarly apparatus – 236 pages of 827 notes, with an 86-page bibliography of some 2,400 titles, to support 133 pages of text." She also identified multiple influences on Duerr's thinking, including historian and philosopher of science Paul Feyerabend, the philosopher Ludwig Wittgenstein, the historian of religions Mircea Eliade, and the anthropologist Carlos Castenada.

Ultimately, Doniger O'Flaherty was critical of Dreamtime, commenting that "Duerr is attempting to hunt with the hounds and run with the hare, and his book is likely to infuriate both ordinary readers and scholars." Although initially appearing suitable for the average reader, she felt that most would be put off by the "daunting scholarly apparatus" he had employed, and the "heaviness of the argument". Believing that the book was difficult to read, she felt that Duerr had hidden his arguments in the footnotes, and that reading the first third of the book was akin to "wandering stoned through the stacks of a very fine European library, browsing in the sections devoted to witchcraft, hallucinogens and orgiastic cults. It is good fun, but it is not for all tastes." She equally felt that the book would be criticized by academics and other scholars working in the fields of witchcraft history and the history of religion, who would recognize that the book not only contained multiple factual errors, but also that many of Duerr's arguments were unoriginal, having previously been made by Mircea Eliade and Victor Turner.

Writing for the Los Angeles Times, Kenneth Atchity described Duerr's book as being "outstanding for its weirdness and provocation" despite the fact that its "anthropology is neither original nor precise." Atchity maintains that Dreamtime offers nothing new except "the energy of its serendipity", noting similarities with books such as James Frazer's The Golden Bough (1890), Robert Graves' The White Goddess (1948), and the works of Carlos Castenada. Although of the opinion that it contained "patches of brilliant illumination", Atchity ultimately considered Dreamtime to be an "obscure essay on the human experience."

=== Wider influence ===
In 1983, German academics Rolf Gehlen and Bernd Wolf published Der Gläserne Zaun: Aufsätze zu Hans Peter Duerrs "Traumzeit" ("The Glass Fence: Essays on Hans Peter Duerr's Dreamtime"), an edited volume of papers discussing Duerr's work. Duerr's theories were evaluated by Belgian anthropologist Rik Pinxten in an academic paper entitled "Dreamtime: Relativism and Irrationality in the Work of Hans Peter Duerr" (1992), published in the Cognitive Relativism and Social Science volume. Pinxten discussed the role of German anthropology within academia and its influence on philosophy and described Dreamtime as "the most important publication" to emerge from the interaction between the two disciplines.

In her study of feminist-orientated Wicca in New Zealand (2004), the anthropologist Kathryn Rountree remarked that along with historian Carlo Ginzburg's Ecstasies: Deciphering the Witches' Sabbath (1989), Dreamtime offered "perhaps the most detailed investigation so far" of the Witches' Sabbath. Similarly, Duerr's work was referenced by anthropologist Susan Greenwood in her study of the Wiccan and ceremonial magical communities of London, Magic, Witchcraft and the Otherworld (2000).

According to Dutch historian Willem de Blécourt, Dreamtime was responsible for first introducing the 1692 case of Thiess of Kaltenbrun, the 'Livonian werewolf', to Anglophone scholarship. Prior to this, he noted, scholarly debate on the case had been restricted to German-speaking scholars. Duerr had briefly discussed the case in the chapter "Wild Women and Werewolves", in which he compared it with various European folk traditions in which individuals broke social taboos and made mischief in public, arguing that they represented a battle between the forces of chaos and order.
