= Zaube Parish =

Parish of Latvia

- parish of Latvia
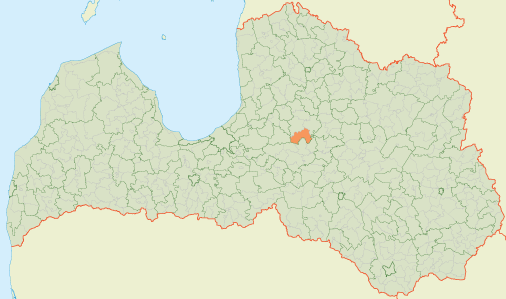
- 56°59′32″N 25°18′13″E

- Location within Latvia
- Country: Latvia

Area
  - Total: 163.44 km^{2} (63.10 sq mi)
  - Land: 159.22 km^{2} (61.48 sq mi)
  - Water: 4.22 km^{2} (1.63 sq mi)

Population (1 January 2026)
  - Total: 670
  - Density: 4.2/km^{2} (11/sq mi)

Zaube Parish (Latvian: Zaubes pagasts) is an administrative unit of Cēsis Municipality in the Vidzeme region of Latvia. The administrative centre is Zaube.

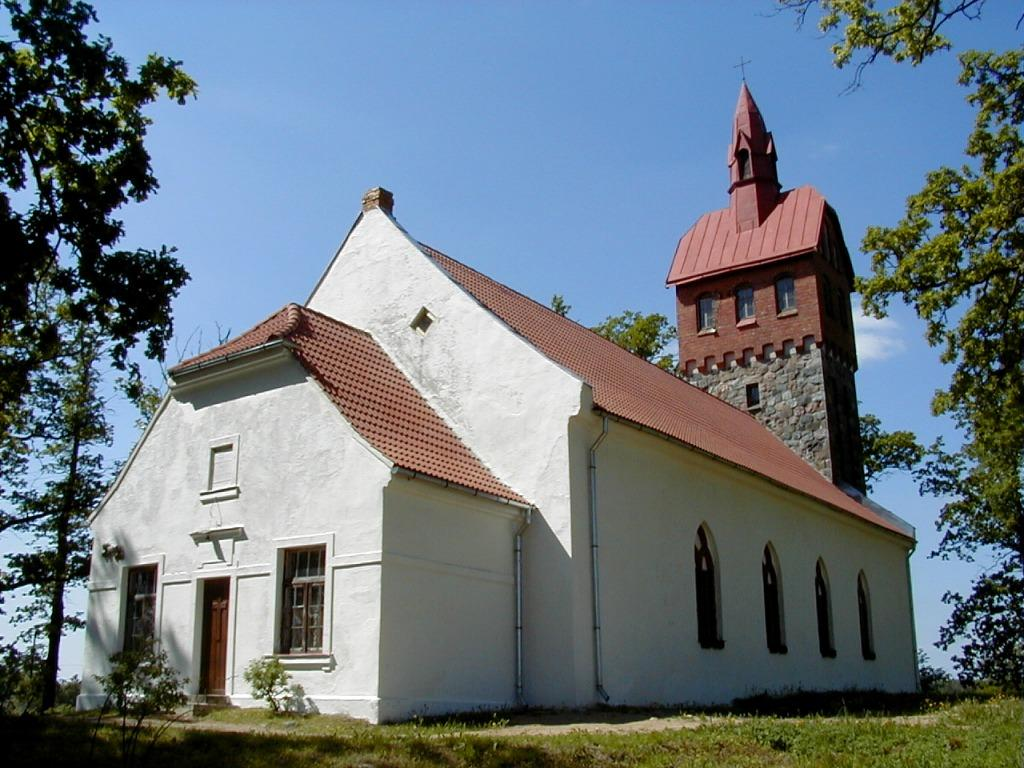
Lutheran church in Zaube village

== Towns, villages and settlements of Zaube Parish ==
- Annas
- Bērzs
- Kliģene
- Zaube
