= Ecstasies: Deciphering the Witches' Sabbath =

1989 book by Carlo Ginzburg

Ecstasies: Deciphering the Witches’ Sabbath
- First edition (Italian)
- Author: Carlo Ginzburg
- Original title: Storia notturna: Una decifrazione del Sabba
- Language: Italian
- Subjects: Italian history History of religion
- Publisher: Giulio Einaudi, Hutchinson Radius
- Publication date: 1989, 1990 (translation)
- Publication place: Italy
- Media type: Print (Hardback and paperback)
- Pages: 339
- ISBN: 978-0-09-174024-5

Ecstasies: Deciphering the Witches' Sabbath is a study of visionary traditions in Early Modern Europe written by the Italian historian Carlo Ginzburg. First published by Giulio Einaudi in 1989 under the Italian title Storia notturna: Una decifrazione del Sabba, it was later translated into English by Raymond Rosenthal and published by Hutchinson Radius in 1990.

Ecstasies builds on the theories put forward in Ginzburg's 1966 book The Night Battles, in which he studied the benandanti, a visionary folk tradition found in the north-eastern Italian province of Friuli during the 16th century.

== Reception ==
In his study of contemporary Pagan Witchcraft The Triumph of the Moon (1999), the English historian Ronald Hutton (1953–) of the University of Bristol noted that Ecstasies was "something which probably nobody else could have written, and which broke important new ground." Nonetheless, he felt that it had "the faults common to such bold and broad-brush enterprises, of covering too much too fast, and with too much dependence upon the author's original, narrower body of expertise; in this case, his impressions of tribal shamanism and ancient paganism were both somewhat sketchy, and arguably too much was extrapolated from the very unusual phenomenon of the benandanti of Friuli, his first study."

Hutton proceeded to note that Ginzburg's work in Ecstasies represented "an extensive and fruitful development" of the idea that "underlying the early modern stereotype of satanic witchcraft lay not merely intellectual constructs but a network of ancient popular beliefs regarding night-flying spirits and goddesses, with their retinues." He asserted that in this manner, Ecstasies built on the work of the historian Norman Cohn (1915–2007) in his book Europe's Inner Demons (1975).

== See also ==
- The Night Battles: Witchcraft and Agrarian Cults in the Sixteenth and Seventeenth Centuries
- Shaman of Oberstdorf: Chonrad Stoeckhlin and the Phantoms of the Night
- Between the Living and the Dead: A Perspective on Witches and Seers in the Early Modern Age
- Cunning Folk and Familiar Spirits: Shamanistic Visionary Traditions in Early Modern British Witchcraft and Magic
