= April Witch =

Book by Majgull Axelsson

- Author: Majgull Axelsson
- Language: Swedish
- Published: 1997
- Publisher: Rabén Prisma
- Publication place: Sweden
- Awards: August Prize of 1997

April Witch (Swedish: Aprilhäxan) is a 1997 novel by Swedish author Majgull Axelsson. It won the August Prize in 1997.

== Plot ==
The book is about Desirée, who is severely disabled, and her three foster sisters, who are all named after the "Haga princesses". Because she was taken away to an institution as a child because of her disability, the sisters do not know her, but she can follow their lives as she is an "April Witch" and can see through the eye of any other creature. She feels that one of the sisters has stolen the life that was meant for her.
