= Felicitas Goodman =

American linguist and anthropologist

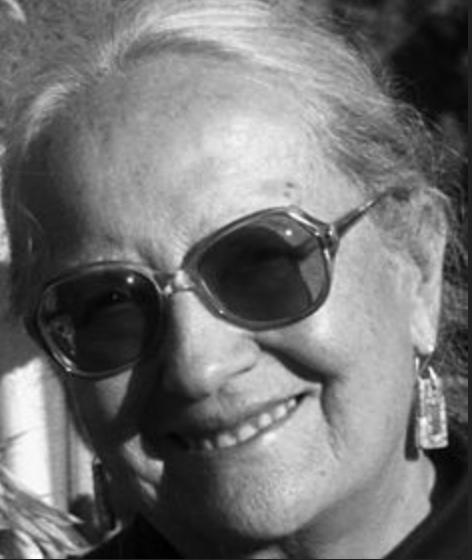

Felicitas D. Goodman (January 30, 1914 – March 30, 2005) was a Hungarian-born American linguist and anthropologist. She was a highly regarded expert in linguistics and anthropology and researched and explored Ecstatic Trance Postures for many years. She studied the phenomenon of speaking in tongues in Pentecostal congregations in Mexico. She is the author Speaking in Tongues and Where the Spirits Ride the Wind: Trance Journeys and Other Ecstatic Experiences (1972). Her work has been published mostly in the United States and Germany.

== Biography ==
In 1978, Goodman founded The Cuyamungue Institute in Cuyamungue, New Mexico, to continue her research into altered states of consciousness and to hold workshops. After the publishing of Where the Spirits Ride the Wind: Trance Journeys and Other Ecstatic Experiences, Goodman's following grew, primarily in the US and Germany, among New Age and Neoshaman practitioners as well as scholars in her field. Before her death in 2005, Goodman had published over 40 articles and more than seven books. Her book, The Exorcism of Anneliese Michel, was the inspiration for the film The Exorcism of Emily Rose.

A biography of Goodman in comic book form (Pueblo Spirits: in the life of Felicitas D. Goodman) was published by her daughter, Susan G. Josephson in 2014.
