= Caul =

Membrane covering the head and face of a newborn at birth

A caul is a piece of membrane that can cover a newborn's head and face. Birth with a caul is rare, occurring in fewer than 1 in 80,000 births. The caul is harmless and is immediately removed by the attending parent, physician, or midwife upon birth of the child.

An en-caul birth is different from a caul birth in that the infant is born inside the entire amniotic sac (instead of just a portion of it). The sac balloons out at birth, with the amniotic fluid and child remaining inside the unbroken or partially broken membrane.

== Types ==
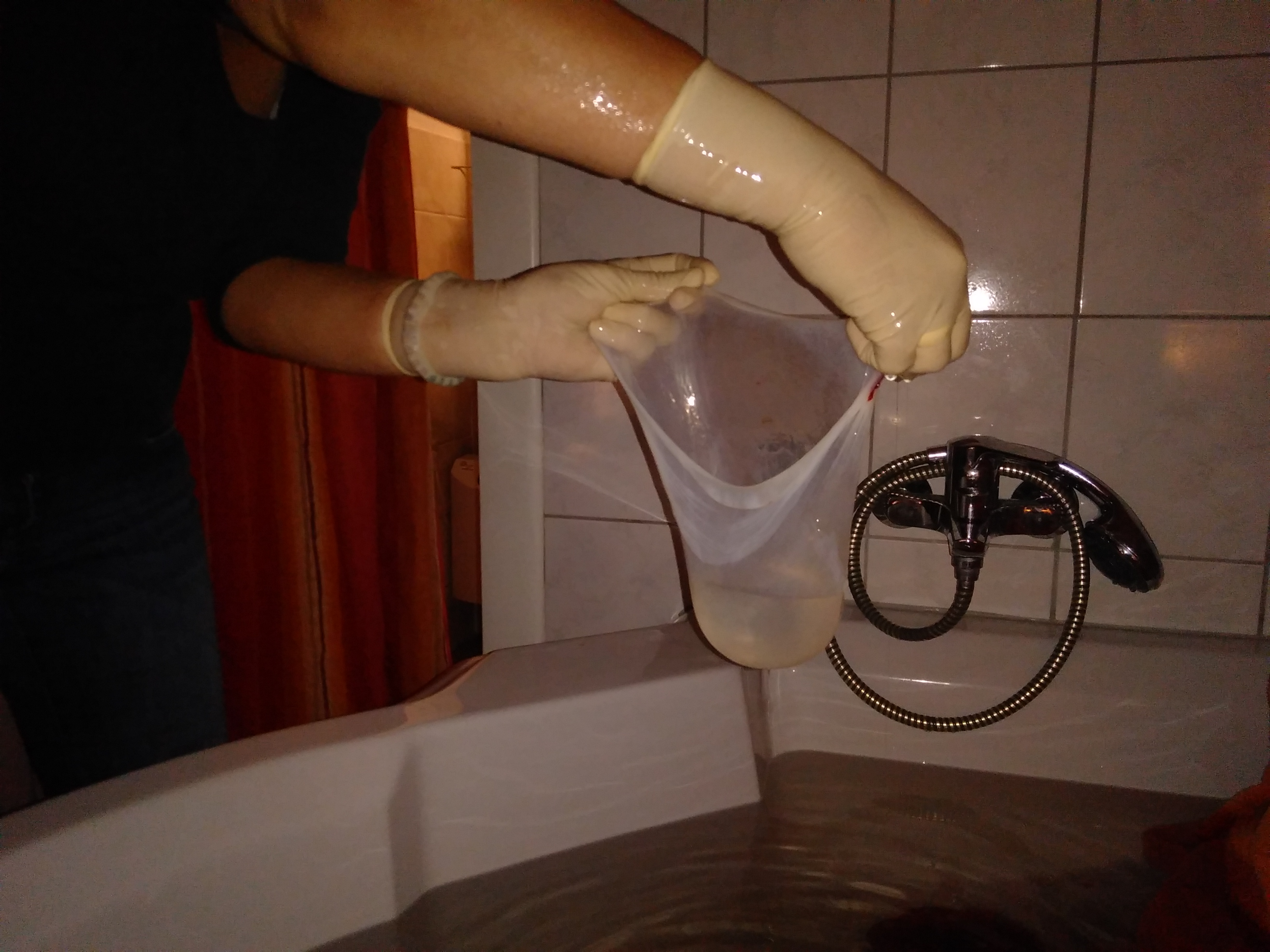
The amniotic sac from an en caul birth.

A child 'born with the caul' has a portion of a birth membrane remaining on the head. There are two types of caul membranes: the first is the inner layer, called the amnion, which is the amniotic sac that contains the fetus and the amniotic fluid; the second is the chorion, the outermost membrane around the fetus, containing a complex series of blood vessels connected to the endometrium, which together with the chorion forms the placenta.

The most common caul type is a piece of the thin translucent inner lining of the amnion that breaks away and forms tightly against the head during birth. Such a caul typically clings to the head and face but on rarer occasions drapes over the head and partly down the torso.

=== En-caul birth ===
A second type of (in) caul birth, in which the amniotic sac covers the whole newborn, is called an en-caul (meaning "in caul" in latin) birth. Sometimes this is called a mermaid birth. In this rare (fewer than 1 per 80,000 deliveries) but harmless type of en-caul birth, the sac does not stop at the head, but instead covers the whole newborn. This is more common (and sometimes even thought of as safer) in caesarean section births. In a fully en-caul birth, the umbilical cord provides oxygen to the neonate while it is still fully enveloped in the embryotic sac.

== Removal ==
The caul is harmless and is immediately removed by the attending parent, physician, or midwife upon birth of the child. If the membrane is of the amniotic tissue, it is removed by easily slipping it away from the child's skin. The removal of the thicker membrane is more complex. First, the attending practitioner will make a small incision in the membrane across the nostrils so that the child can breathe. The loops are then carefully removed from behind the ears. The remainder of the caul is then either peeled back very carefully from the skin or else gently rubbed with a sheet of paper, which is then peeled away. If removed too quickly, the caul can leave wounds on the infant's flesh at the attachment points, which might leave permanent scars.

== Epidemiology ==
Birth with a caul is rare, occurring in fewer than 1 in 80,000 births. This statistic includes en-caul births, which occur more frequently than authentic caul births; therefore, authentic caul births are even more rare than indicated by the raw statistic. Most en-caul births are premature. Research in the 2020s has shown that surgical techniques during caesarean deliveries of severely premature infants that focus on delivering the infant with the caul intact can potentially increase the baby's chances of survival, as it protects the underdeveloped fetus from being harmed by the muscle contractions of the uterus, and from the doctors and nurses accidentally harming the fetus while removing it from the uterus.

== Folk traditions ==
According to the unreliable Historia Augusta, the boy-emperor Diadumenian (208–218) was so named because he was born with a diadem formed by a rolled caul.

In medieval times, the appearance of a caul on a newborn baby was seen as a sign of good luck. It was considered an omen that the child was destined for greatness. Gathering the caul onto paper was considered an important tradition of childbirth: the midwife would rub a sheet of paper across the baby's head and face, pressing the material of the caul onto the paper. The caul would then be presented to the mother, to be kept as an heirloom. Some Early Modern European traditions linked caul birth to the ability to defend fertility and the harvest against the forces of evil, particularly witches and sorcerers such as the benandanti. (Note: The story of these so-called benandanti is recounted in Carlo Ginzburg's 1983 study.)

Folklore developed suggesting that possession of a baby's caul would bring its bearer good luck and protect that person from death by drowning. Cauls were therefore highly prized by sailors. Medieval women often sold them to sailors for large sums of money; a caul was regarded as a valuable talisman.

In Polish the idiom w czepku urodzony/a lit. 'born in a bonnet', in Italian nato/a con la camicia lit. 'born with a shirt' and in French né(e) coiffé(e) lit. 'born with a hat on' all describe a person who is always very lucky.

The Russian phrase родился в рубашке (rodilsya v rubashke lit. 'born in a shirt') refers to caul birth and means 'born lucky'. It is often applied to someone who is oblivious to an impending disaster that is avoided only through luck, as if the birth caul persists as supernatural armor, and in this sense commonly appears in titles or descriptions of Russian dashcam videos.

In Jamaican folklore, duppy cannot harm and are powerless against people who were born with a caul.

The 16th-century Dutch physician Levinus Lemnius, author of The Secret Miracles of Nature, remained skeptical of superstitious claims about preserved cauls. 19th-century comic writer Thomas Hood even ended his poem "The Sea-Spell" with a lament about a drowning sailor's futile reliance on a protection charm:

Heaven never heard his cry,
Nor did the ocean heed his caul.

== Notable people born "in the caul" ==
- Barbara Barondess (1907–2000), American actress
- Edwin Booth (1833–1893), American actor
- Lord Byron
- Charles XII of Sweden
- Gabriele d'Annunzio
- Andrew Jackson Davis
- J. G. Farrell, novelist
- George Formby, English comedian
- Sigmund Freud
- Johnny Giles
- Lillian Gish
- Charles Haughey, Taoiseach na hÉireann (Prime Minister of Ireland)
- James VI, King of Scotland and England
- Liberace
- Edna St. Vincent Millay
- Abraham Ribicoff
- Jonas Salk
- Cora L. V. Scott (1840 – 1923), American medium
- Lee Shelton (disputed)
- Joseph Smith
- Nancy Wake
- Kim Woodburn

== In popular culture ==
In the classic 1850 novel David Copperfield by Charles Dickens, the title character and novel narrator describes his own birth: "I was born with a caul, which was advertised for sale, in the newspapers, at the low price of fifteen guineas." Copperfield goes on to describe the fate of his caul, which was re-sold and raffled over the subsequent decade as a talisman believed to protect its owner from death by drowning.

In the novel Oscar and Lucinda by Peter Carey, Theophilus Hopkins, father of the hero, Oscar, gives to his son a little box, inside which there is "a caul, the little membrane that had covered Oscar's head at birth and it had been kept, his mother had kept it, because it was said – superstitiously, of course – that such a thing would protect the child from drowning".

An en caul birth is depicted in the episode "Heavy Hangs the Head" (S03E01) of the Apple TV+ science fiction series See.

Other depictions include:

- In the 1980 horror film The Shining, Danny Torrance is born with a caul, possibly causing his clairvoyant abilities.
- In the 1987 novel Seventh Son by Orson Scott Card, the protagonist Alvin Miller is born with a caul. Several times during the novel, a girl named Peggy Guester (a "torch") secretly uses the powers of Alvin's caul to protect him from harm.
- In Barbara Kingsolver's novel Demon Copperhead (2022), the protagonist is born with a caul, with the superstition that he could not die by drowning.
- In the FX series The Strain, Zach is born in a caul in S3 Episode 3 "First Born".
- In J.D. Salinger's novel The Catcher in the Rye, the protagonist is significantly named Holden Caulfield.
- In the novel, A Tree Grows in Brooklyn, Francie Nolan is born with a caul.
- In 9-1-1: Nashville, Season 1 Episode 2 "Hell and High Water", the infant is depicted being born fully en caul, necessitating its rupture.

== See also ==
- Vernix caseosa
- Meconium
