= Zaube =

Center of Zaube Parish, Cēsis Municipality, Latvia

Zaube Jürgensburg
- Village
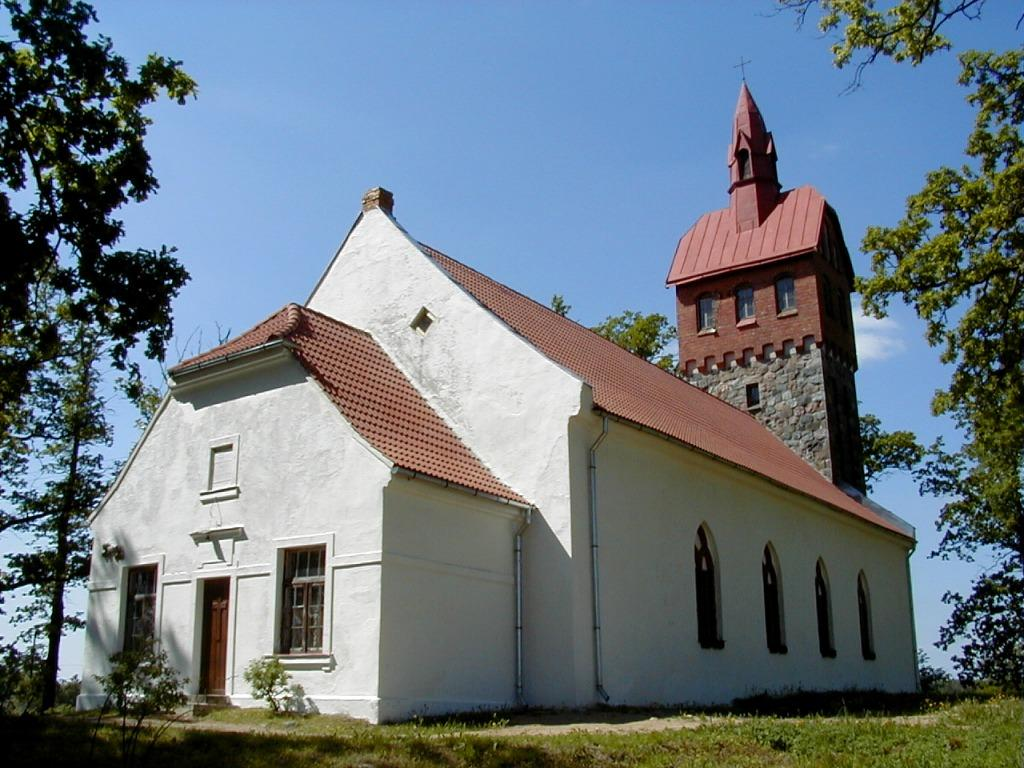
- Village church in Zaube

- Zaube's location in Latvia
- Coordinates: 56.9963°N 25.2611°E
- Country: Latvia
- Municipality: Cēsis
- Parish: Zaube

Population (31 January 2021)
  - Total: 290
- Postal code: LV-4113 Zaube

Zaube (German: Jürgensburg) is a village in Zaube Parish, Cēsis Municipality in the Vidzeme region of Latvia.

== Notable people ==
- Thiess of Kaltenbrun (Tīss), self-confessed werewolf and condemned heretic, main character of the 2025 film Dog of God
