= Majgull Axelsson =

Swedish journalist and writer

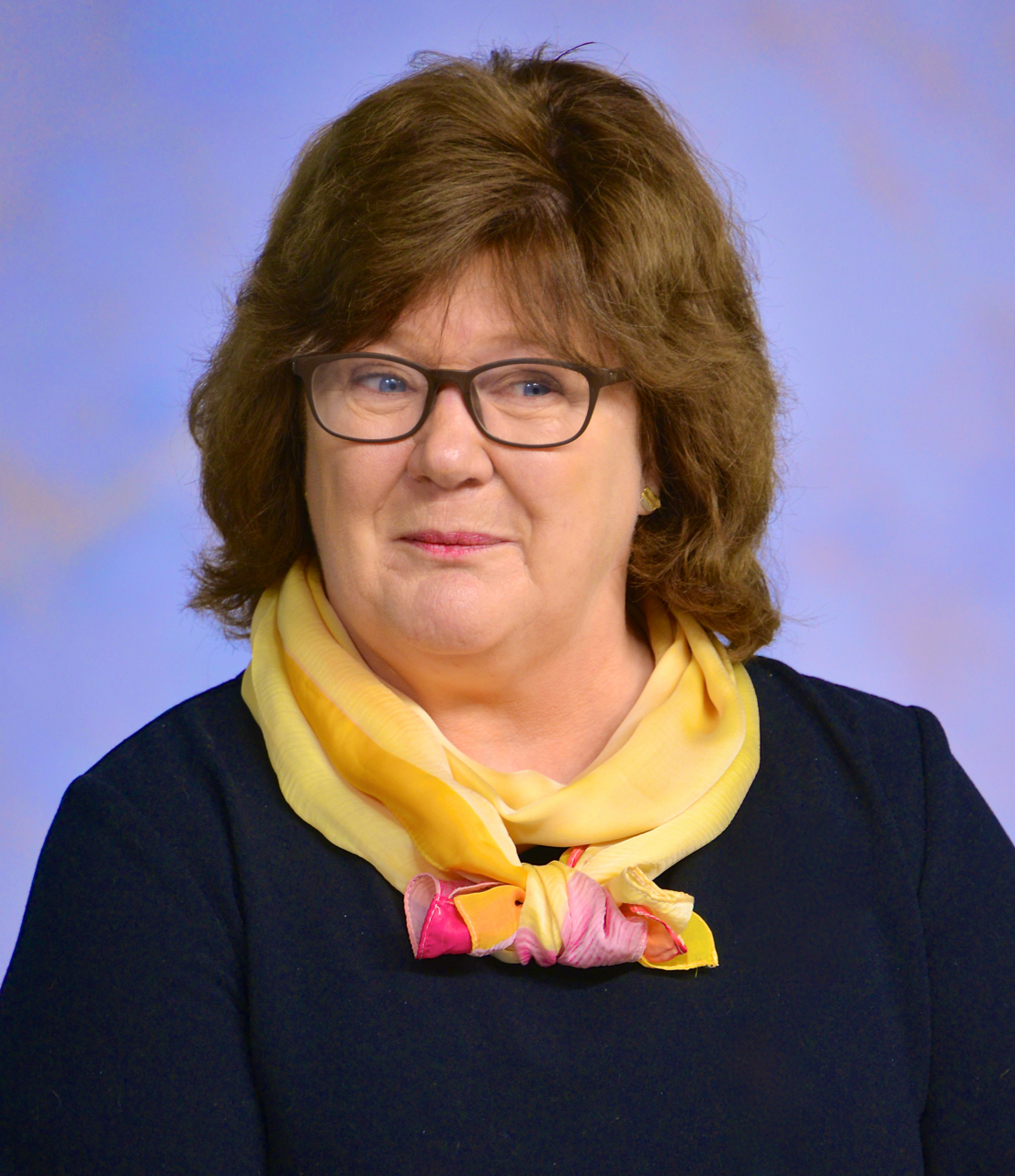
Majgull Axelsson at the Book & Library Fair, 2008

Majgull Axelsson (born 1947 in Landskrona) is a Swedish journalist and writer.

She grew up in Nässjö and completed her education in journalism.

== Life and career ==
Her first book was non-fiction, and focused on the problems of child prostitution and street children in third world, and poverty in Sweden. April witch is her second novel, and one that was well received in Sweden. With over 400,000 copies sold in hardcover, it landed on several bestseller lists for months and received important Swedish literature awards including the Moa Martinsson Prize and Jörgen Eriksson's Prize. It addresses themes of mother-daughter relationships, competition between women, and the failures of Sweden's postwar welfare state.

She made her debut as a novelist in 1994 with Långt borta från Nifelheim, and has since written several novels. For her writing, Majgull Axelsson has been awarded the Guldpocket for the sales success of Aprilhäxan and the August Prize for the same novel. She has been translated into 23 languages. In Sweden she is published by Brombergs bokförlag.

She made her debut as a playwright in 2002 with Lisalouise, which premiered that year at the Dramaten and was followed in 2007 by the play Helgonlegender, a "mourning song about the dismantling of the Swedish people's home". Majgull Axelsson also wrote the text for a musical work of art, Holocene, which was performed in the Berwaldhallen in connection with the 2008 Baltic Sea Festival. In the fall of 2011, she participated in SVT's Sommarpratarna.

Axelsson lives with her husband on Lidingö.

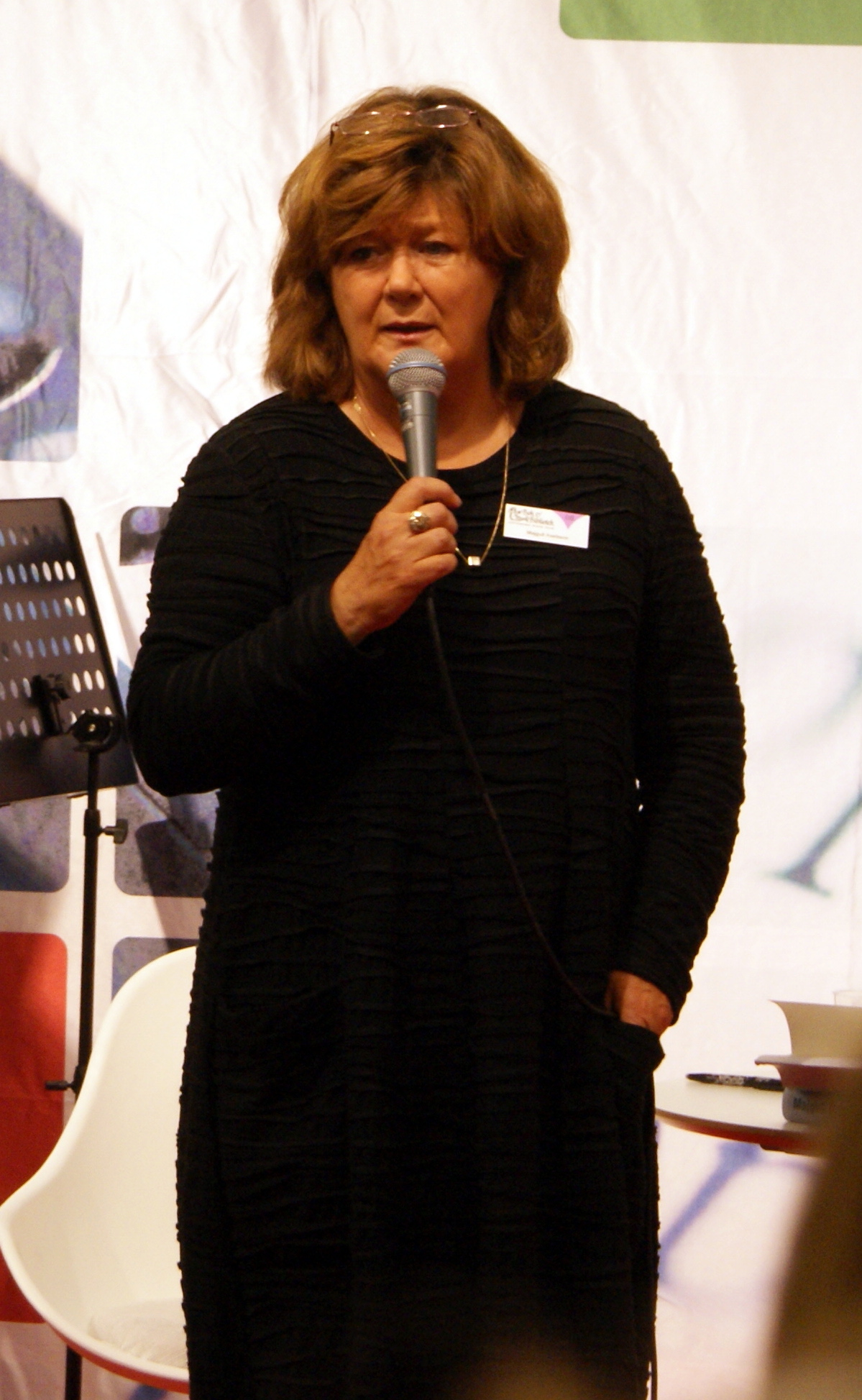
Majgull Axelsson, Swedish author

== Bibliography ==
=== Non-fiction ===
- 1986 – Our Smallest Brothers (Våra minsta bröder)
- 1989 – Rosario Is Dead (Rosario är död)
- 1991 – They Kill Us (De dödar oss)
- 1996 – And Those Who Don't Have (...och dom som inte har)

=== Fiction ===
- 1994 – Far away from Nifelheim (Långt borta från Nifelheim)
- 1997 – April Witch (Aprilhäxan)
- 2000 – Random House (Slumpvandring)
- 2004 – The Woman I Never Was (Den jag aldrig var)
- 2008 – Ice and Water, Water and Ice (Is och vatten, vatten och is)
- 2011 – Moderspassion ("Mother's Passion")
- 2014 – Jag heter inte Miriam ("My Name Is Not Miriam")
- 2017 – Ditt liv och mitt ("Your Life and Mine")

=== Plays ===
- 2002 – LisaLouise
