= Hans Peter Duerr =

German anthropologist and author

- Born: Hans Peter Duerr; 6 June 1943; Mannheim, Germany
- Occupation: Anthropologist
- Known for: Dreamtime

Hans Peter Duerr (born 6 June 1943) is a German anthropologist and author of ten books on anthropology. Duerr studied at both the University of Vienna and the University of Heidelberg, eventually gaining his doctorate in 1971 with a dissertation on consciousness theory in philosophy. From 1975 through to 1980 he worked as a lecturer and visiting professor of ethnology and cultural history at the University of Zurich, University of Kassel and University of Bern, before settling down permanently at Kassel. From 1992 to 1999 he taught as a professor of anthropology and cultural history at the University of Bremen, before moving back to Heidelberg.

He has published multiple books in German, one of which has been translated as Dreamtime: Concerning the Boundary between Wilderness and Civilization. From 1988 through to 2002 he published a five volume magnum opus entitled Der Mythos vom Zivilisationsprozeß.

== Bibliography ==
- Ni Dieu - ni mètre. Anarchische Bemerkungen zur Bewußtseins- und Erkenntnistheorie. 1974
- Traumzeit. Über die Grenzen zwischen Wildnis und Zivilisation. 1978
- Satyricon. 1982
- Sedna oder Die Liebe zum Leben. 1984
- Der Mythos vom Zivilisationsprozeß
  - Band 1: Nacktheit und Scham. 1988
  - Band 2: Intimität. 1990
  - Band 3: Obszönität und Gewalt. 1993
  - Band 4: Der erotische Leib. 1997
  - Band 5: Die Tatsachen des Lebens 2002
- Frühstück im Grünen. Essays und Interviews. 1995
- Gänge und Untergänge. 1999
- Rungholt. Die Suche nach einer versunkenen Stadt. 2005
- Tränen der Göttinnen. 2008
- Die Fahrt der Argonauten. 2011
