= Cunning Folk and Familiar Spirits =

2005 book by Emma Wilby

Cunning Folk and Familiar Spirits: Shamanistic Visionary Traditions in Early Modern British Witchcraft and Magic
- The book's jacket displays a detail from The Garden of Earthly Delights (c. 1500), an oil painting by the Medieval Dutch artist Hieronymous Bosch (c. 1450–1516).
- Author: Emma Wilby
- Language: English
- Subject: British history History of religion
- Publisher: Sussex Academic Press
- Publication date: 2005
- Publication place: United Kingdom
- Media type: Print (Hardback and paperback)
- Pages: 317
- ISBN: 978-1-84519-079-8

Cunning Folk and Familiar Spirits: Shamanistic Visionary Traditions in Early Modern British Witchcraft and Magic is a study by historian Emma Wilby of the beliefs regarding witchcraft and magic in Early modern Britain. First published by Sussex Academic Press in 2005, the book makes the case that beliefs regarding familiar spirits found among magical practitioners – both benevolent cunning folk and malevolent witches – reflected evidence for a general folk belief that stemmed from a pre-Christian visionary tradition.

Wilby uses witch-trial records as evidence to advance the theory, developed by Carlo Ginzburg, Éva Pócs, and Gábor Klaniczay, that a substratum of shamanistic beliefs across Europe influenced Early Modern beliefs about magic and witchcraft. Divided into three parts, Wilby argues that (1) familiar spirits were a concept widely found among ordinary magical practitioners rather than being an invention of demonologists conducting witch trials; (2) these familiar spirits were not simply popular folklore, but reflected the existence of a living visionary tradition with shamanistic origins; and (3) such aspects of Britain's spiritual heritage significantly contributed to the nation's subsequent history.

Scholarly reactions to the book were mixed, although the work was broadly recognized as an important contribution to studies of witchcraft. Wilby later expanded this theory by examining the case of the accused witch Isobel Gowdie, in her 2010 book The Visions of Isobel Gowdie: Magic, Witchcraft, and Dark Shamanism in Seventeenth-Century Scotland.

== Background ==
=== Historical research ===
Prior to Wilby's work, the English historian Owen Davies had researched the role of the cunning folk in Early Modern Britain, culminating in the publication of his 2003 book Cunning-Folk: Popular Magic in English History. Davies had rejected the idea that there had been any shamanistic traditions among the cunning folk of Britain, and furthermore argued that the Early Modern cunning tradition should not be seen as being a continuation of a pre-Christian practice, relating that "to emphasise their pagan roots is about as meaningful or meaningless as pointing out the pagan origins of early modern potting."

"Historians such as Carlo Ginzburg, Gabór Klaniczay and Éva Pócs have argued that descriptions of sabbath experiences and familiar-encounters found in early modern European witch trials were expressions of popular experiential traditions rooted in pre-Christian shamanistic beliefs and practices. As a result of this work, most scholars now acknowledge that there was a genuinely folkloric component to European witch beliefs in this period, although opinions still differ as to its extent."

— Emma Wilby, 2005.

From the 1930s onward, various historians studying the witch trials on continental Europe had begun arguing that in some areas, the image of the witch had been influenced by underlying local folklore about visionary journeys.

Poc's book on Hungarian witchcraft and magic appeared in her native language in 1997, before being published in an English translation in 1999 as Between the Living and the Dead.

=== Wilby and her research ===
At the time of writing, Wilby had done some part-time teaching at Exeter University, although was essentially performing the research in her capacity as an independent scholar. Wilby's unpublished work came to the attention of the historian Ronald Hutton of Bristol University, a specialist in Early Modern Britain, who would later note that he "gave it all the help that I could, in making suggestions for improvement to the manuscript, encouraging a publisher, and writing an endorsement", believing that Wilby had "repaid my faith richly with the result."

== Synopsis ==
Wilby opens her book with a transcript from the trial of the cunning woman Bessie Dunlop, which took place in Edinburgh in 1576, in the midst of the Early Modern witch trials. Dunlop had been accused of "Sorcery, Witchcraft and Incantation, with Invocation of spirits of the devil", found guilty, and executed through strangulation.

=== Part One ===
The first part of Cunning Folk and Familiar Spirits is devoted to a historical examination of the professional cunning folk and accused witches of Early Modern Britain, with a particular focus on the beliefs in familiar spirits that they held to; according to Wilby, this serves the purpose of "illustrat[ing] in some detail, the event-pattern, emotional dynamics, and social context of the alleged familiar-encounter, and secondly to illustrate how encounter-narratives were not merely élite fictions, that is, the result of learned prosecutors superimposing their demonological preconceptions onto cunning folk and witches, but were rooted in folk belief and came, in significant part, from the magical practitioners themselves." After laying out the basis of her argument in the book's introduction, Wilby starts by giving a context for the world of Early Modern Britain, which was for the common people an unceasingly poor and traumatic place, filled with folk beliefs about magic, religion, animism, and fairies of both Christian and pre-Christian origin.

For the sake of discussion, she simplifies the various contemporary terms for folk magic practitioners into two types: cunning folk, who generally perform beneficial magic, and witches, who generally perform harmful magic, also known as maleficium, and she explains the types of services each typically provided, often for others in exchange for goods or services. Wilby also condenses the various types of spirits that assist magic practitioners into two categories: familiar spirits for cunning folk and demon familiars for witches. Drawing from the many trial records of those accused of witchcraft during this period, she illustrates the ways that magic practitioners first meet their familiars, the types of working relationships they might have, the demands made by familiars (such as the renunciation of Christianity), and the morally ambiguous space that cunning folk and witches occupied in society.

=== Part Two ===
The second part of the book proceeds to lay out the case that the encounters with familiar spirits recorded by those investigating cunning folk and alleged witches did not simply reflect "accumulations of folk belief" but that instead they offer real "descriptions of visionary experiences - actual psychic events which occurred in historical time and geographical space" which "could be interpreted as evidence that popular shamanistic visionary traditions, of pre-Christian origin, survived in many parts of Britain during the early modern period." Wilby turns to anthropological methods to make this point: since little to no evidence of pre-Christian beliefs in Britain exist, she looks at other indigenous shamanic traditions—namely Siberian and Native American, modeled after the anthropological work of Alan Macfarlane and Keith Thomas. She details the ways in which shamans of these cultures meet their spirit guides, form a working relationship together, invoke them, and build intimate, fulfilling relationships together that can last for decades, all while drawing parallels to the customs of Early Modern British cunning folk and witches that she laid out in part one. She points out that in addition to similarities in practicies, there are also similarities in beliefs: both believe in a spirit world that exists separately from our own and that magic practitioners can travel there, but that they must do so carefully because if a human's soul gets trapped there, their body will die.

=== Part Three ===
The third and final part of Wilby's study deals with what she describes as "the possible spiritual significance of these traditions," which includes the argument that these encounters with familiars were actually mystical experiences. She reviews the ways that scholars have looked at the ontology of familiar encounters, which often include the belief that they were partly or wholly fiction, as opposed to the contemporary writings that treated them as real events. Specifically, she analyzes the nature of European Witches' Sabbaths, whether they were "empiracally real events" or "illusory" ones; both contemporary writers and present day scholars have puzzled over this question, and Carlo Ginzburg suggested a new option in 1989: that these events were "evidence of the survival of ritual trance experiences derived from pre-Christian Eurasian shamanism". Wilby argues that the familiars themselves might have been the result of the same phenomenon. Even though scholars thus far had not explored that possibility because trial transcripts did not support this claim, she points out that shamans of all cultures typically have difficulty talking about their experiences. She also points out direct evidence of trance-inducing techniques used in witches' sabbaths and indirect evidence of it used in invoking familiars.

Wilby notes the various ways that scholars have "pathologized" these familiar encounters by describing them as fantasies and mental illnesses, not unlike the way scholars once analyzed shamanistic beliefs. Scholars now believe that shamans provide a benefit to their society, and even describe their experiences as mystical. Ken Wilber theorized that there are ten "levels of consciousness", of which the top four can be described as "transcendent". Roger Walsh built on this work by showing that shaman's visionary experiences fit into the eighth level, called the "subtle" level, also citing the work of Carl Jung that describes them as "real" experiences. Learned magicians of the period who practiced "high magic" have been recognized as having mystical experiences, so Wilby provides some reasons that scholars may have treated common magic practitioners differently: these practitioners were illiterate and therefore never recorded their experiences, they were intimidated by crowded courtrooms during witch trials, they sometimes used methods of deception that our culture would term quackery, they didn't conform to today's preconceptions of mysticism that we inherited from Christianity, and there was a large gulf between the way they experienced the world versus scholars of today—the last point being elucidated by Ananda Coomaraswamy's claim that our society suffers from "imaginal illiteracy" which prevents our mind from forming images in the same way as illiterate peoples.

Wilby draws parallels between the cunning folk and witches to Christian contemplatives whose status as mystics is taken as historical fact, including Margery Kempe, Walter Hilton, Teresa of Ávila, Bridget of Sweden, Hadewijch, and Christina Ebner. She discusses research that claims mystic experiences are innate to the human condition, and that a percentage of people are naturally predisposed to experience them, but explains that everyday conditions in Early Modern Britain which are much less present in our society today—malnutrition, grief, darkness, hallucinogenic poisoning, and animist beliefs—are many of the same conditions that tend to induce mystical experiences, and are often practiced as part of shamanistic traditions. Wilby concludes by saying that although these folk magic beliefs and practices have mostly been lost to history, they contain an essential human truth evidenced by the recent resurgence of magical practices, such as neo-paganism.

== Reviews and reception ==
=== Academic reviews ===
"Emma Wilby's views challenge those of other current historians, notably Owen Davies, who sees cunning folk as far more pragmatic and down-to-earth, and Diane Purkiss, who interprets the encounters of witches with fairies as compensatory psychological fantasies. The debate between these and other scholars will be very instructive."

— Folklorist Jacqueline Simpson, 2006.

In her ordinary review of the book published in Folklore, the journal of the Folklore Society, the English folklorist Jacqueline Simpson described Wilby's theories as "bold stuff", but argued that while "I found her theory stimulating", she did not think that it was "wholly convincing". Simpson noted that there "are too many places where the inevitable shortage of evidence is circumvented by that familiar device, the argument that although we cannot prove X, neither can we prove not-X, so let us assume X." Continuing with her critique, Simpson also disagreed with Wilby's distinction between the "fairy familiars" of cunning folk and the "demon familiars" of witches, noting that the distinction broke down upon further scrutiny, and that as such the very inclusion of this distinction had been "unnecessarily laborious".

"In its intellectual sophistication and ethical awareness it offers an excellent model of how the stories of witches and cunning people might best be approached. In this it follows in the footsteps of at least two of the author's major influences, Ronald Hutton and the late Gareth Roberts. Both of these scholars' works sensitively walk a line between the traditional (and flawed) concept of academic objectivity and the (laudably acknowledged) human subjectivity that inevitably will and certainly should connect the author with his or her theme."

— Historian Marion Gibson, 2008.

Writing in the journal Magic, Ritual, and Witchcraft, the historian Marion Gibson of the University of Exeter was more positive, calling Cunning Folk and Familiar Spirits "bold, yet careful and intellectually rigorous", praising Wilby's inclusion of Bessie Dunlop's original trial records and ultimately relating that "This is by far the most persuasive account of such a [mystic] "tradition" that I have read. It avoids sloppy thinking and overstatement in a way that is rare and very creditable. It is exciting and fulfilling in its own right without needing to make unprovable claims. Optimistically and humanely, it makes its strong case for a British shamanic tradition. Whether readers agree with Wilby's conclusions or not, this is a very important book."

=== Wider reception ===
In an article written for The Pomegranate: The International Journal of Pagan Studies, the historian Ronald Hutton, who had aided Wilby in editing her manuscript and finding a publisher, noted his belief that Cunning Folk and Familiar Spirits was "so important" for witchcraft studies because it dealt "directly with the possible relations between the people concerned and a spirit world", something which recent British scholarship in the field had tended to avoid. Believing that "[n]obody had done anything like this before", Hutton did however admit to some criticisms, relating that "I think some of her suggestions more speculative than others, and (as she knows) I worry a bit about her selective use of widely scattered examples of what can be called shamanism taken from other parts of the world. This, however, does nothing to diminish my enthusiasm for her work."

Wilby's work also proved an influence on the historian Joyce Froome in her study of the Pendle witches, Wicked Enchantments (2010).

== See also ==
- Shaman of Oberstdorf: Chonrad Stoeckhlin and the Phantoms of the Night
- Between the Living and the Dead: A Perspective on Witches and Seers in the Early Modern Age
