= Welsh Witch =

The term Welsh Witch may refer to:

- Ceridwen, a prominent figure in Welsh mythology, often seen as the European archetype of a witch
- Gwen ferch Ellis, (c.1542 – 1594) the earliest known Welsh woman to be executed on charges of witchcraft
- Gwrach y Rhibyn (English: Witch of the mist) a monstrous spirit in the form of a hideous woman
- Rhiannon, the figure in Welsh mythology erroneously labelled as a witch by Stevie Nicks
- Stevie Nicks, sometimes called "the Welsh witch" due to her stage persona and her song Rhiannon, which Nicks would introduce as "about a Welsh witch"
- The Nine Witches, a recurring theme in Welsh mythology
- The Witches of Llanddona a family of witches in Welsh folklore

== See Also ==
- Welsh people
- Witchcraft in early modern Britain
- Witchcraft in early modern Wales
