= Between the Living and the Dead =

1997 book by Éva Pócs

Between the Living and the Dead: A Perspective on Witches and Seers in the Early Modern Age
- The cover to the first English edition
- Author: Éva Pócs
- Language: Hungarian; English
- Subject: Hungarian history History of religion
- Publisher: Akadémiai Kiadó, Central European University Press
- Publication date: 1997, 1999 (translation)
- Publication place: Hungary
- Media type: Print (Hardback and paperback)
- Pages: 186
- ISBN: 978-963-9116-19-1

Between the Living and the Dead: A Perspective on Witches and Seers in the Early Modern Age is a study of the beliefs regarding witchcraft and magic in Early Modern Hungary written by the Hungarian historian Éva Pócs. The study was first published in Hungarian in 1997 as Élők és holtak, látók és boszorkányok by Akadémiai Kiadó. In 1999, it was later translated into English by Szilvia Rédey and Michael Webb and published by the Central European University Press.

Building on the work of earlier historians such as Carlo Ginzburg and Gábor Klaniczay, both of whom argued that Early Modern beliefs about magic and witchcraft were influenced by a substratum of shamanistic beliefs found in pockets across Europe, in Between the Living and the Dead, Pócs focuses in on Hungary, using the recorded witch trial texts as evidence to back up this theory.

The reviews published in specialist academic journals were mixed, with many applauding the fact that information on Hungarian witchcraft was being brought to a wider English-speaking audience. Conversely, some reviewers claimed that Pócs' argument was largely unconvincing and lacked sufficient evidence to support it, with criticisms also being aimed at Pócs' writing style and the quality of the English translation.

== Background ==
=== Pócs' research ===
In gathering the data for her book, Pócs noted that she made use of "several thousand pages of records", all of which pertained to the Hungarian witch trials of the 16th, 17th and 18th centuries. This included published documents relating to "approximately two thousand witch trials", and several hundred further documents which were unveiled in the course of Pócs' research by her team, who included fellow academics Gabór Klaniczay, Katalin Benedek, Ildikó Kristóf and Péter G. Tóth.

== Reception ==
=== Academic reviews ===
In his review for The Journal of the Royal Anthropological Institute, Andrew Sanders of the University of Ulster noted that Pócs' "examination and analysis are folkloric rather than anthropological", and that as a result, "the great majority [of case studies in the book] are examined in insufficient detail and contain inadequate information to answer the kinds of questions likely to be posed by anthropologists." Furthermore, Sanders argued that "the main problem of the book could be poor translation from the original Hungarian. At times the discussion is difficult to follow or to understand, because the account is ambiguous or contradictory and the meaning is unclear". Believing that Pócs went into "bewildering detail" over her categorisation of the different kinds of Hungarian magical practitioner, Sanders finally remarked that the book could have been improved with a "more careful translation and/or presentation" and the inclusion of an index.

"The enormous and perennial interest, of both a scholarly and popular bent, in the topic of European witchcraft has meant that any new contribution to the topic must struggle to distinguish itself from the myriad of research efforts that have gone before. The recent translation into English of Eva Pócs's Between the Living and the Dead well survives this night battle for distinction if only because it engages a corpus of data that has not previously been discussed extensively in the Western literature."

— Bruce McClelland, 2001.

Valerie Kivelson of the University of Michigan called Between the Living and the Dead an "intriguing book" in her review that was published in the Slavic Review journal. Noting that Pócs had set herself an "ambitious, broadly defined project", Kivelson felt that the work had both "strengths and weaknesses". Believing that the sources which she used were "rich and fascinating", containing "vivid testimony and lurid imagination", Kivelson felt that the work provided convincing evidence to support Carlo Ginzburg's theories regarding shamanistic survivals. Nonetheless, Kivelson did have some criticisms, for instance noting that "A more systematic study of Hungarian witchcraft trials and the villages and towns that produced them, even a brief summary of Gabor Klaniczay's work on the subject, would have added force to the argument", whilst she felt that the amount of space given over to categorizing the different types of magical practitioners was "dizzying".

In his review published in the History of Religions journal, Bruce McClelland remarked that in his view too much attention had been paid to the third type of witch by Pócs, leaving him wanting to know more about "the village witch and, to some extent, the more ambiguous figure of the healer-sorcerer". Moving on, McClelland argues that "Pócs is at her best when examining the Hungarian testimony for possible homologies between the witches and sorcerers of central and southeastern Europe (in particular, Romania and south Slavic regions) and those of western Europe", but he also felt that Pócs could have discussed the effect that the tensions between Roman Catholicism and Orthodox Christianity might have had on Hungarian views of witchcraft. Further noting that he would have liked to have seen "a closer comparison between several of the Hungarian folkloric figures Pócs identifies as lurking behind the images of witches in the trial narratives and similar figures she notices in the folklore and mythology of neighboring cultures", he also laments that "any political role that gender may have played in the general system of witchcraft and sorcery is not investigated."

"As for analysis or theory, there is none other than the argument that earlier pagan beliefs about magic, the dead, fairies, and shamanism provide the foundations for later beliefs in witchcraft. That, of course, is an argument made many times before."

— T.O. Beidelman, 1999.

Writing in the journal Anthropos, T.O. Beidelman lamented that despite the huge amount of source material that Pócs had to work with, "No account whatsoever is provided to set these witch-hunts and trials (and thus the data at hand) into any kind of historical, cultural, or social contexts. We gain no idea of just what kind of materials may be found in these accounts, who transcribed them, or how these transcriptions may or may not relate to what actually occurred and just who believed what." He argues that Pócs "displays little sense of proper historical procedures" in her method, and that she also "has little concern for any anthropological, sociological, or psychology theory", remarking that ultimately the work is "essentially [a] folkloristic, neo-Frazerian account content to describe a large aggregation of terms, beliefs, and practices mainly with the aims of comparing them to materials from elsewhere in Europe... and of tracing the possible origins of such ideas and customs to earlier beliefs and customs of the pre-Christian or even prehistoric past." He furthermore criticised the style of writing, claiming that it was "rambling and discursive", to the extent that it became "the most serious weakness of this volume". He similarly criticises the translation into English, asserting that it "reads poorly". On a more positive note, Beidelman accepts that the "main value of Pócs's book lies in her making available a broad and detailed array of terms, beliefs, and customary practices of early Hungarian witchcraft and associated supernaturalism" that are otherwise unavailable to English-speaking scholars.

== See also ==
- Shaman of Oberstdorf: Chonrad Stoeckhlin and the Phantoms of the Night
- Cunning Folk and Familiar Spirits: Shamanistic Visionary Traditions in Early Modern British Witchcraft and Magic
