= Shamanism in Europe =

The first historian to posit the existence of European shamanic ideas within popular beliefs of otherwise Christian Europeans was Carlo Ginzburg, who examined the Benandanti, an agrarian cult found in Friuli, Italy, whose members underwent shamanic trances in which they believed they battled witches in order to save their crops.

Historians following Ginzburg identified what they saw as shamanic elements in the accusations of the witch trials of the Early Modern period. These included Éva Pócs and Emma Wilby. This group of authors proposes what is known as the "witch-cult hypothesis", arguing that there was a religious cult with continuity reaching into the pre-Christian period behind what became identified as "witchcraft" in the Early Modern period.

The idea of shamanism's existence in Ancient Greece was advanced by E. R. Dodds and criticized by Michael J. Puett.

== See also ==
- Shamanistic remnants in Hungarian folklore
