= Witchcraft in early modern Wales =

Witchcraft (Welsh: dewiniaeth) in Wales during the early modern period (the 16th to mid-18th century) developed from distinct elements of Welsh Culture, superstition and religion. The country was unique in Europe for its outlook on witchcraft, with none of the mass witch hunts that were seen across Britain and Europe during this period. Ancient Welsh law also provided a framework for responding to accusations of witchcraft in an interpersonal way that maintained communal harmony.

As such, the witch trials that were commonplace in England and Scotland were a late development in Wales, with the first prosecution not recorded until 1595. There was also relatively few accusations and most of the accused were acquitted. Only five people are known to have been executed in Wales for witchcraft during this period.

== Historical and cultural background ==
Witchcraft in early modern Wales was common, and superstitious beliefs and rituals were involved in everyday life. Accusations, trials, and executions were significantly fewer in number than in England, Scotland and other parts of Europe, with only 37 prosecutions in Wales during this time period. England, during the same time period, is believed to have executed 500 people for witchcraft. In addition, most cases in Wales were dismissed or acquitted, and punishment was often less severe than in many other places, where torture was common. According to the historian Richard Suggett, contemporary English sources claimed a belief that different types of magic were used in Wales at this time, both harmful and helpful. Although during early times witchcraft was not always considered malign, during the later Middle Ages beliefs associated with the practice of magic and witchcraft changed, as it was seen as being associated with the devil, and any sort of witchcraft was eventually made illegal.

== Witchcraft laws ==
The Acts of Union from 1536 to 1543 brought Wales under English rule, but Wales's lack of legal consequences through harsh punishments and executions, as well as the deference to the criminal Courts of Great Sessions instead of church courts, in Welsh witchcraft cases indicates that Wales still followed the authority of older Welsh customary laws rather than English law. Pre-union Welsh law emphasised compensation of the victim, rather than punitive punishment of the accused, to ensure a peaceful outcome between all participants and to keep harmony in the community.

=== Acts of Parliament during the early modern period ===
In 1542, under Henry VIII, Parliament passed the Witchcraft Act 1541, which was later repealed under Edward VI. This act deemed witchcraft a crime punishable by death.

In 1563, under Elizabeth I, the Witchcraft Act 1541 was restored as the Witchcraft Act 1563, but the death penalty was only sought when harm was caused by witchcraft.

In 1604, under James I, the 1563 Act was repealed, and the new Witchcraft Act 1603 included different types of punishment for different crimes that were not considered as harmful as others. This law dictated that a guilty person should be imprisoned and suffer pillory for a first offence and death for a second. After the 1563 and 1604 Acts, the church no longer administered witch trials, as this was transferred to the courts.

In 1735, under George II, it became a crime to claim that someone else was practising witchcraft or in the possession of magic powers. This Act, the Witchcraft Act 1735, repealed all previous acts and ended the hunt for witches and executions for witchcraft. The maximum penalty after this was one year in prison.

== Trials, accusations and prosecutions ==
During the 16th and 17th centuries, there were only 37 witchcraft prosecutions in Wales, not all of which resulted in execution. This is relatively few, when compared to the rest of Western Europe, in which there were an estimated 100,000 people who prosecuted for witchcraft in Europe and British America, with between 40,000 and 60,000 were executed. Out of these 37 Welsh suspects, only 8 were found guilty and only 5 received a death sentence, with the remainder more than likely being acquitted. All of the cases, according to Kelsea Rees, a historian at Liverpool Hope University, took place in north Wales. Multiple witchcraft cases were very close to the northern part of the Anglo-Welsh border.

=== Executions ===
In 1594 Gwen ferch Ellis (42) of Llandyrnog, Denbighshire, was the first person to be executed as a witch in Wales. The accusations were that, although she otherwise was known to provide healing, she had turned to do evil. These accusations were based on a charm that was found to be written backwards, and this was thought to be an example of the act of bewitching. After the trial, she was sentenced to death.

In 1622, in Caernarfon, a trio of witches, all from the same family, were found guilty and ultimately executed. The trio consisted of three siblings: Lowri ferch Evan, Agnes ferch Evan, and Rhydderch ap Evan, a yeoman. The cause of their trial was over the death of the wife of a man from the local gentry, Margaret Hughes, and the bewitchment of their daughter, Mary. Margaret was already sick and, according to today's medical knowledge, Mary's so-called "bewitchment" was more likely the symptoms of a stroke due to the lameness of her left arm, feet, and the complete loss of her voice due to loss of function in her tongue.

In 1655, in Beaumaris, Anglesey, Margaret ferch Richard was accused of witchcraft. She was a widow in her mid-to-late 40s and was considered a charmer. She was also believed to have caused the death of another woman, Gwen Meredith, who was ill prior to her untimely death. Margaret was convicted in accordance with the 1604 Witchcraft Act and sentenced to death by hanging.

=== Acquittals ===
In 1655, in Llanasa, Flintshire, another trial took place. Dorothy Griffith was accused of bewitching a travelling seaman, William Griffith. William claimed to have seen Dorothy in front of him with lights around her, and having led him to an ale house. He claimed to have looked out over the sea and saw that it was on fire, and became frightened by the experience. He further was believed to have fallen into a trance or lost consciousness but recovered. Dorothy was detained for 7 weeks but was able to gather signatures from other locals, in which they stated they had never had reason to believe there was any relationship between Dorothy and witchcraft. It was rumoured that the relationship between the two families was tense and that William had been ill. Although Dorothy appeared at trial, it is believed that the case was eventually dismissed, and she was never sentenced. The case of Dorothy Griffith is one of 32 cases that were acquitted.

=== Other accusations and consequences ===
This is a list of people who were accused of being witches or sorcerers and what happened to them in Wales.

Name	Date	Location	Details	Consequence
Tangwlyst ferch Glyn	1560s	St Davids	Accused by Bishop St. David of cohabiting with a man, and so she created a figure of the Bishop and cursed him. The Bishop fell ill but the incident came to nothing. This is the only example in Wales of a poppet being used in this way. Tanglwyst was lucky, as the Witchcraft Act of 1563 came into force a little later in her lifetime.	Unknown
Hugh Bryghan	1568	Glamorgan	Hugh was prosecuted for bewitchment rather than witchcraft. According to him, he was a soothsayer (but he might have called himself a dyn hysbys) and that he used crystals to find lost goods by calling on the powers of the trinity. Hugh denied that he worked with spirits, later claiming that it was all an illusion.	Fined and released
Gwen ferch Ellis	1594	Llandyrnog, Denbigh	A fortune teller who created healing ointments to heal animals, sick people, and children. She was accused of writing a charm backwards – for evil purposes – which was found in the house of Thomas Mostyn, one of the most important nobles and landowners of that period.	She was found guilty and hanged before the end of the year in Denbigh Town Square
Gruffydd ap Dafydd ap Siôn and others	1579	Montgomery	Dafydd Lloyd brought a case against Gruffydd ap Dafydd ap Siôn and others to the attention of Sir John Throckmorton and claimed that they used evil spirits, charms, and witchcraft to enchant an apple and powder which he gave to Lloyd's daughter, Margaret ferch Dafydd, in order to force her to run away with Siôn ap Gryffudd. After eating the apple, she was taken against her will to Denbighshire by the defendants where they raped her.	The records of the Montgomery Court of Great Session do not record the results.
Marsli Ferch Thomas	1584	Flintshire	Marsli and her children were accused of cursing William Lewis and his master.	Unknown
Katherine Lewis/Bowen	1607	Gumfreston	She was accused of cursing a herd of pigs and causing the loss of goods and property by performing "demonic arts."	Unknown
Agnes Griffiths	1616/1618	Manordeifi	Accused of fetish witchcraft and pricking "something" in her left hand and burning five candles on the tips of her fingers.	Unknown
Rhydderch ap Evan, Lowri ferch Evan, ac Agnes ferch Evan	1622	Llannor, Llŷn Peninsula	Accused of felony witchcraft. It is claimed that they caused the death and robbery of Marged Huws from Llanbedrog. They pleaded not guilty but were found guilty.	Hung
Harry Lloyd	1632	Caernarfon	He was accused of using "unlawful and evil arts," including fortune-telling, divination, and "being acquainted with evil spirits at night." Harry admitted that he met the fairies and other spirits every Tuesday and Thursday night to make his neighbors rich.	Unknown
Henry John James	1637/1638	Dyserth	He was accused of being a sorcerer and a conjurer and that he practiced witchcraft. The main charge was that he cursed two oxen that belonged to John Wynn Edwards.	He was begged to ask God to bless the oxen.
Marged ferch Rhisiart	1655	Beaumaris	Marged was accused of cursing Gwen Meredith after she fell ill and died at the end of December. Marged pleaded not guilty but she was found guilty.	Hung in Beaumaris
Gwenllïan David	1656	Unknown	A cheese seller who was accused of witchcraft and theft.	Unknown
Anne Ellis	1657	Penley	Accused of witchcraft, good and bad, against live stock and children.	Acquitted
Dorothy Griffith	1656	Llanasa	Dorothy was accused of witchcraft and cursing William Griffith. She pleaded her innocence.	Acquitted
Charles Hughes	1690	Llanasa	He was accused of injuring his landlord's cattle, but in what form was not mentioned.	Acquitted
Olivia "Olly" Powell	1693	Loveston	Accused of destroying a rick of hay, sickening sows, transforming into, and running like, a hare, and killing poultry. When a man refused to give him coal, he got pain in his legs. Her case was held at Haverfordwest Castle.	Unknown
Dorcas Heddin	1699	Haverfordwest	Originally from Cambridge, Dorcas was accused of making sailors sick because they did not give her enough rations. Her case was held at Haverfordwest Castle.	Unknown

== Early modern beliefs about witchcraft ==
Blessings were the act of protecting oneself or others from anything evil; they were considered part of everyday life during the early modern period. It was believed that good or evil could come to a person based on whether or not they had received a blessing. If someone did something that was considered to be unacceptable by the society in which they lived, it was important to seek a blessing in order to avoid some form of punishment. A curse, however, would often be done in order to inflict misfortune on someone's family or property. Formal cursing was the practice of involving God and hexing the wrongdoer, often on the knees with arms stretched towards Heaven. When someone had been cursed, it was common to have the curse removed by the person who had originally inflicted the curse. It was not unusual for people who resorted to cursing others to be thought of as using witchcraft.
