= Beatrix Watsone =

Scottish accused witch

- Born: c. 1606
- Died: 1649 (aged 43)
- Cause of death: Suicide by hanging
- Spouse: Alexander Scott
- Children: 1

Beatrix Watsone (or Watson; c. 1606–1649) was accused of witchcraft in 1649 at Corstorphine Parish Church, Edinburgh, and died of suicide before trial.

== Life ==
Watsone was a weaver, who was born in approximately 1606. She was married to Alexander Scott, a weaver and had a daughter named Bessie Scott. She was arrested at the age of forty-three, and accused of witchcraft in Corstorphine, Edinburgh in 1649. She denied all charges and hanged herself whilst in prison, before her trial.

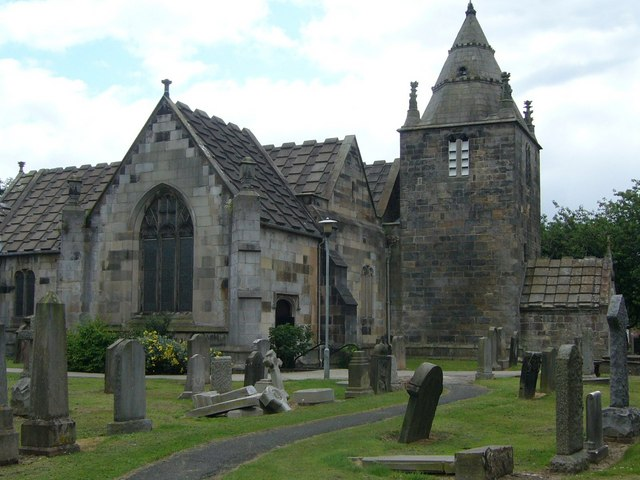
Corstorphine Parish Church where Watsone was accused

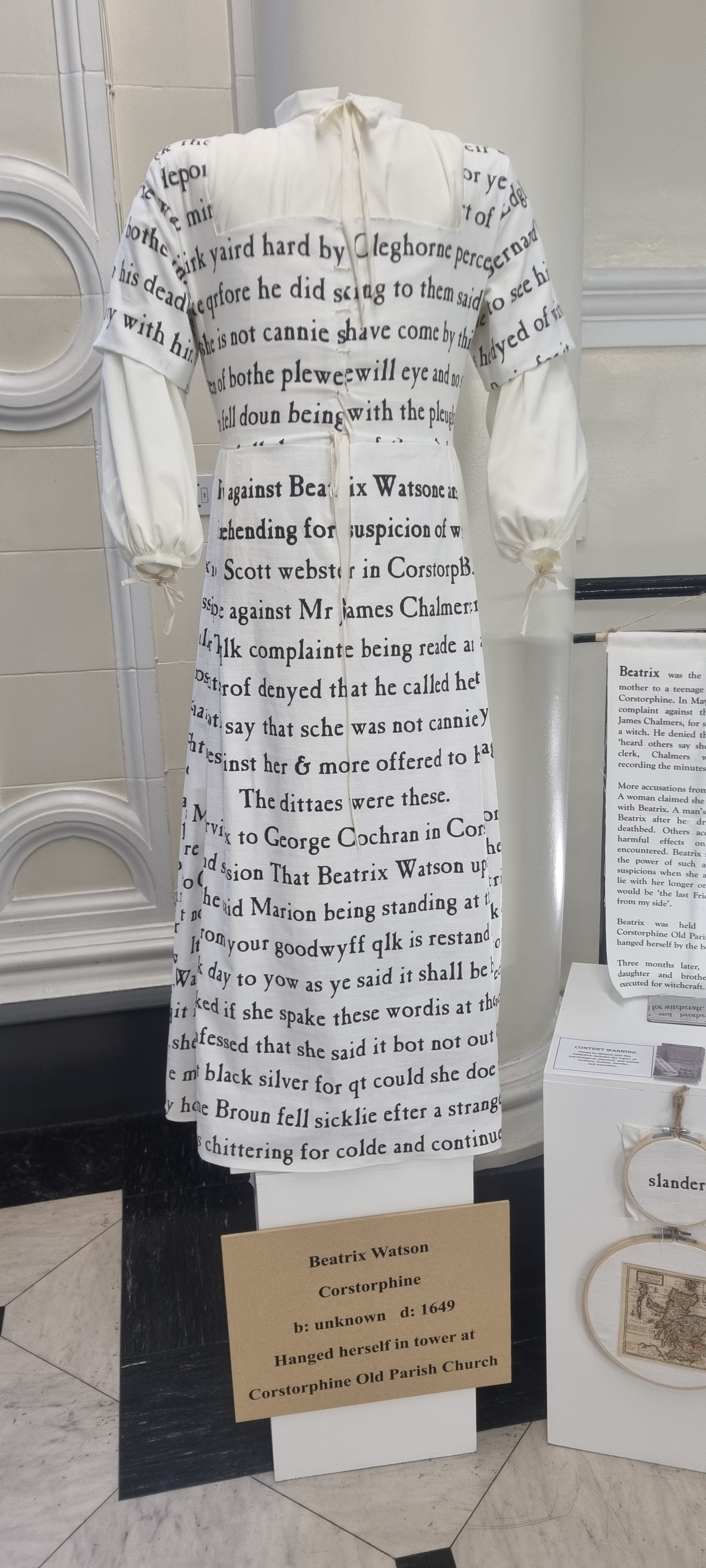
Beatrix Watsone - a dress of accused witch created as part of exhibition by Carolyn Sutton, Witches in Word not Deed.

=== Trial ===
Watsone was accused by four women and five men of maleficium, neighbourhood disputes and performing white magic. One of her accusers, William Scott said he had met the Devil whilst with Watsone, and was offered gold to become the Devil's servant and was re-baptised in a blasphemous demonic ceremony. During that year there were a large number of witch trials and witchhunts in Scotland, as witchcraft was considered a criminal offence whose punishment was death.

Her particular case was first heard by the Corstorphine Parish Church Kirk Session, who interviewed the witnesses and Watsone, as the accused. She declared her innocence and said that she had been slandered by the schoolmaster. The investigators were the parish minister, Reverend David Balsillie, the minister at Corstorphine from 1626 to 1654, and James Robertson, the justice depute.

They requested the laird of Corstorphine, Sir George Forrester to have Watsone arrested and put in prison. The jailor at Corstorphine Church was James Haddey. Watsone however was left alone in the tower and she hanged herself while in custody, and before her trial took place.

=== Legacy ===
Watsone was one of thirteen accused witches, memorialised in an exhibition in 2023 'Witches in Words, not Deeds, created by Carolyn Sutton, MLIS, AA. Watsone was one of the figures exhibited at Edinburgh's Central Library from September to November 2023. The artist had made her dress of white linen imprinted with the words that condemned her.
