= Shaman of Oberstdorf =

1994 book by Wolfgang Behringer

Shaman of Oberstdorf: Chonrad Stoeckhlin and the Phantoms of the Night
- The English language cover of the book.
- Author: Wolfgang Behringer
- Language: German, English
- Subject: German history History of religion
- Publisher: R. Piper GmbH & Co
- Publication date: 1994, 1998 (translation)
- Publication place: Germany
- Media type: Print (Hardback and paperback)
- Pages: 203
- ISBN: 978-0-8139-1853-2

Shaman of Oberstdorf: Chonrad Stoeckhlin and the Phantoms of the Night is a study of the arrest and trial of Chonrad Stoecklin (1549–1587), a German herdsman from the town of Oberstdorf who was accused and executed for the crime of witchcraft after experiencing a series of visions. Wolfgang Behringer, a historian of the witch trials in the early modern period, wrote the book in German as Chonrad Stoekhlin und die Nachtschar: Eine Geschichte aus der frühen Neuzeit, published by R. Piper GmbH & Co. in 1994, with the subsequent English translation by H.C. Erik Midelfort published by the University of Virginia Press in 1998.

Reviews in scholarly academic journals were largely positive, with several reviewers remarking that Behringer had presented a more believable case than Ginzburg for the existence of visionary traditions in Early Modern Europe.

== Background ==
"Historians such as Carlo Ginzburg, Gabór Klaniczay and Éva Pócs have argued that descriptions of sabbath experiences and familiar-encounters found in early modern European witch trials were expressions of popular experiential traditions rooted in pre-Christian shamanistic beliefs and practices. As a result of this work, most scholars now acknowledge that there was a genuinely folkloric component to European witch beliefs in this period, although opinions still differ as to its extent."

— Emma Wilby, 2005.

=== Shamanistic traditions in Early Modern Europe ===
From the 1960s onward, various historians studying the witch trials on continental Europe had begun arguing that in some areas, the image of the witch had been influenced by underlying local folklore about visionary journeys.

Poc's book on Hungarian witchcraft and magic appeared in her native language in 1997, before being published in an English translation in 1999 as Between the Living and the Dead.

== Reviews and reception ==
=== Academic reviews ===
"In discussing popular beliefs in the phantoms of the night Behringer emphasizes the continuities between ancient pagan ideas and those of the peasants and herdsmen in the Allgäu. At the same time, however, he modifies the controversial thesis, advanced by Carlo Ginzburg... that the Friulian peasants known as benandanti who, like Stoecklin, fell into trances and went out at night to fight the witches, represented the essence of a mythic pan-European consciousness rooted in pagan fertility rites. He also modifies the arguments of Russian folklorists that men like Stoecklin embodied a pure form of ancient shamanism. For Behringer the long process of Christianization during the Middle Ages, coupled with the efforts of the Counter Reformation to root out superstition and to provide catechetical instruction during the sixteenth century, had already dissolved some of the elements of these ancient myths. Instead, a more complex process occurred by which fragments of old myths survived and then generated new ones."

— Brian P. Levack, 2000.

Writing in Church History, the journal of the American Society of Church History, the historian Brian P. Levack of the University of Texas (2000) described Shaman of Oberstdorf as a "fascinating study of popular witch beliefs in late-sixteenth-century Germany", relating that the "most valuable part of Behringer's investigation lies in his exploration" of these popular beliefs and how they "served as a prelude to the massive regional witch hunt that took place in southern Germany from 1587 until 1592." Ultimately, he felt that the book was "a carefully constructed, judicious, and gracefully translated work of original scholarship that illuminates some of the most important issues in the history of witchcraft and the history of popular culture. It deserves a wide audience."

Georg Modestin of the University of Fribourg (2000) reviewed Behringer's book for The Sixteenth Century Journal, in which he remarked that it was "obvious that the issue of this particular book is not social history", instead focusing in on "Stoeckhlin's depositions". In this respect, Modestin felt that Shaman of Oberstdorf was exploring a form of "mythical archaeology" which "may at times remind one of Carlo Ginzburg's attempts in Ecstasies"; however Modestin recognised that "Behringer is well aware of all the pitfalls related to the subject", thereby not expanding his search for the origins of the shamanistic visionary traditions into prehistory as Ginzburg had done. Although predominantly positive about the book, Modestin did criticise the choice of title chosen for the English translation, believing that "Shaman of Oberstdorf" was "unnecessarily spectacular" considering the fact that in the book, "Behringer only very tentatively speaks of shamanism."

"Where Ginzburg sought typologically to prove the continuous existence of a reified shamanistic tradition stretching back into Eurasian prehistory, Behringer's analysis more sensibly foregrounds the contingent and the contextual: no cultic continuity then, but rather survivals of mythic fragments, "vestigial mythologems" (p. 145), subject to constant reconfiguration and hermeneutic and functional shifts."

— Trevor Johnson, 2001.

The American History Review published a review written by Trevor Johnson (2001) of the University of the West of England, Bristol, in which he described Behringer's work in a positive manner. Johnson noted that Behringer "deftly unpacks the nuances of Alpine legend-motifs from the often careless and naïve, if not designing, assumptions of nineteenth and twentieth-century nationalist folklorists." He goes on to note that Behringer's "patient dissection of [the folklorists'] sleights of hand is one of the many delights of the book, but another is his vivid and moving evocation of the social, economic, and political realities of the early modern Alpine world and his tone of solidarity with the victims and their class (for example, automatically supplying the birth and death dates of even the humblest bit-players in his story)." Johnson notes that Shamans of Oberstdorf inevitably "invites comparison with the modern classics of Carlo Ginzburg, particularly The Night Battles (1983) and Ecstasies (1990)", with the two historians dealing with a clear "material overlap", but nonetheless Johnson believes that the two "employ radically different methodoligies." Praising Midelfort's English language translation, Johnson believed that it was a "tribute to Behringer's fascinating book" that it left the reader yearning "to know more", particularly about "how the social, economic, political and religious tensions evident in this region, as elsewhere, in the post-Reformation period affected relationships between the living and the dead generally."

=== Wider influence ===
The French Medievalist Claude Lecouteux highlighted Behringer's book in the preface to the 1996 edition of his book Witches, Werewolves and Fairies: Shapeshifters and Astral Doubles in the Middle Ages. Arguing that Behringer's findings supported his own theories regarding the concept of the double, he lamented however that Behringer seemed "completely unfamiliar" with such a theory.

== See also ==
- Between the Living and the Dead: A Perspective on Witches and Seers in the Early Modern Age
- Cunning Folk and Familiar Spirits: Shamanistic Visionary Traditions in Early Modern British Witchcraft and Magic
