= Emma Wilby =

British historian and author

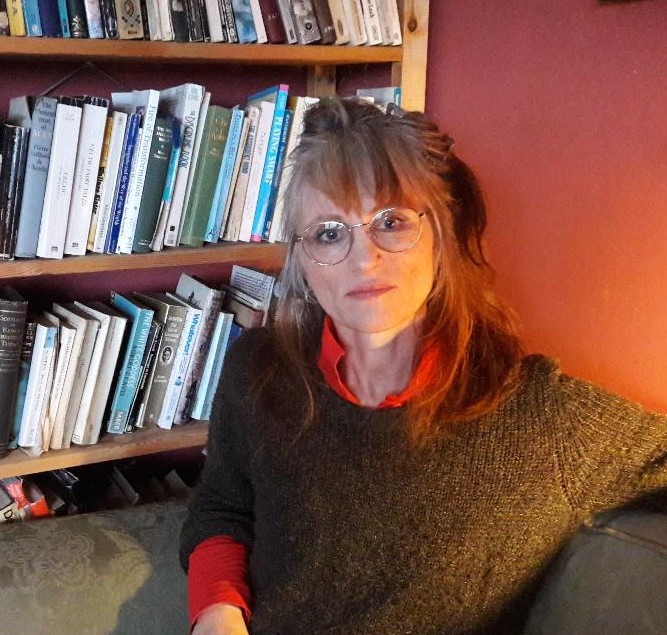
- Emma Wilby in 2019
- Born: 1963 (age 62–63); UK
- Occupations: Honorary Fellow, University of Exeter

Emma Wilby is a British historian and author specialising in the magical beliefs of Early Modern Britain.

== Work ==
An honorary fellow in history at the University of Exeter, England, and a Fellow of the Royal Historical Society, she has published three books examining witchcraft and the cunning folk of this period. In the first two, she has identified what she considers to be shamanic elements within the popular beliefs that were held in this place and time, which she believes influenced magical thought and the concept of the witch. In this manner, she has continued with the research and theories of such continental European historians as Carlo Ginzburg and Éva Pócs.

Wilby's first published academic text, Cunning Folk and Familiar Spirits: Shamanistic Visionary Traditions in Early Modern British Witchcraft and Magic (2005), was the first major examination of the role that familiar spirits played in Britain during the Early Modern period, and compared similarities between the recorded visions and encounters with such spirits, with shamanism in tribal societies.

The historian Ronald Hutton commented that "Wilby's book is a remarkably interesting, timely and novel way of looking at [magic and witchcraft], and one of the most courageous yet attempted." Another historian specialising in Early Modern witchcraft, Marion Gibson, described the book by saying that "Wilby's conclusions turn out to be a challenge and inspiration to everyone who is interested in the popular magical cultures of the past or the present ... Optimistically and humanely, the book makes its strong case for a British shamanic tradition. Whether readers agree with Wilby’s conclusions or not, this is a very important book."

Wilby followed this work with The Visions of Isobel Gowdie: Magic, Witchcraft and Dark Shamanism in Seventeenth-Century Scotland (2010), which provided the first in-depth examination of the witch trial of Isobel Gowdie in 1662. Wilby obtained copies of the trial records, which had been presumed lost for two centuries, from which she concluded that Gowdie had been involved in some form of shamanic visionary trances.

In The Visions of Isobel Gowdie Wilby extended the hypothesis set out in Cunning Folk and Familiar Spirits to include the concept of ‘dark shamanism’ (or, shamanic practices that benefit people or things belonging to one group by harming people or things belonging to another). She noted that recent anthropological research suggests that dark shamanism plays a much bigger role in tribal shamanic practice than previously thought and that when this new paradigm is brought to the analysis of witch confessions like Isobel Gowdie’s, the correlation between European witchcraft and shamanism becomes even more compelling.

While controversial, The Visions of Isobel Gowdie was widely celebrated among historians of witchcraft for bringing new perspectives to the subject. Writing in the Journal of Scottish Historical Studies, Lawrence Normand claimed that "Like the theoretical physicist, the historian of early modern witchcraft must speculate and hypothesise in order to generate understanding of inaccessible phenomena; and one of the great strengths of this book is the precision and daring of its speculations. Witchcraft studies should change as a result of the ideas this book contains … The extraordinary range of materials that it brings to bear on the Isobel Gowdie case will certainly change our understanding of this particular case, as well as the ways that witchcraft scholars are enabled to think about some of the most difficult questions of witchcraft itself."

Writing in the journal Pomegranate, Ronald Hutton wrote that the book: "is in my opinion the finest reconstruction of the thought-world of somebody accused in an early modern witch trial yet made, making sense of elements that most people would find wholly fantastic."

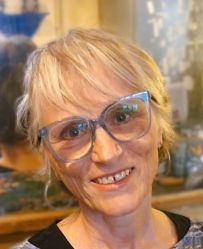
Emma Wilby in 2025

In her third book, Invoking the Akelarre (2019), Wilby examines the controversial Basque witch craze that took place in 1609-14. Here she argues against the assumption by academic writers that the sensational accounts of the Black Mass and orgies at the witches’ sabbath were largely reflections of witchcraft propaganda and stereotypes imposed by inquisitors. As in her first two books, she suggests that the witch suspects used genuine memories and dreams linked to their own thoughts and experience when claiming they had been involved in these events.

Chapters cover the way that knowledge of domestic medicine, New World cannibalism and community Catholic ritual were used to create the dramatic accounts of talking toad familiars, cannibalistic feasts and the Black Mass. Even the accounts of Basque witch cult structure and rites, the most detailed in Europe, are linked by Wilby to suspects’ membership of religious confraternities and craft guilds before they were arrested. Through these analyses, Invoking the Akelarre continues Wilby’s efforts to restore agency to the women who were accused of Devil worship in Europe’s witch trials. A Spanish translation was published in 2025.

In 2023, Wilby turned back towards the shamanistic hypothesis with a research paper exploring the role of spirit possession in early modern witchcraft. She argues that witchcraft scholars have historically neglected claims, by many witch suspects, that they did not want to serve the Devil and that they were forced to go to the sabbath and perform harmful magic against their will. Working with the ideas of continental scholars, such as Éva Pócs, she argues that this theme of spiritual aggression is more closely linked to popular beliefs and practices around demonic possession than elite constructs of demonological witchcraft and, beyond this, with the broader cultural network of beliefs and practices around unsought possession by other spirits such as fairies, divine beings, and the dead. Wilby suggests that these ideas could strengthen and refine the shamanistic hypothesis developed by Ginzburg et al., and could reinforce the links between popular religion and pre-Christian antecedents in Europe’s premodern era.
