= Gábor Klaniczay =

Hungarian professor (born 1950)

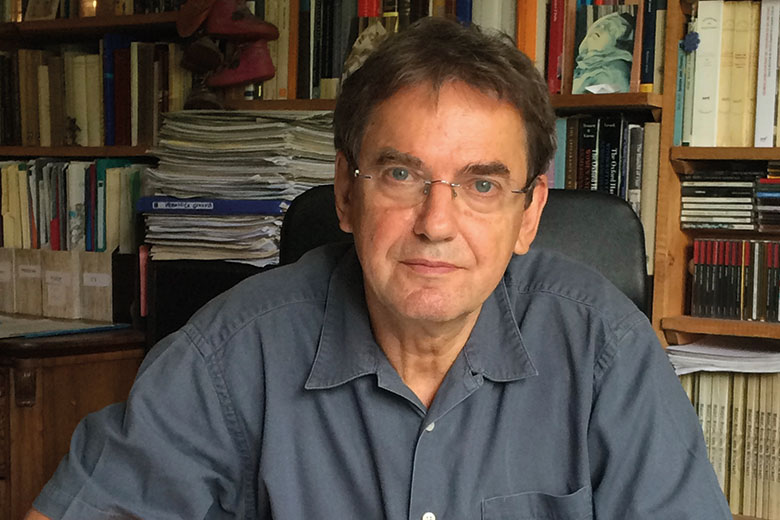
Gábor Klaniczay

Gábor Klaniczay (born 18 July 1950, in Budapest) is Professor Emeritus of Medieval Studies at the Department of Historical Studies (formerly the Department of Medieval Studies) of the Central European University, Budapest/Vienna. He is also titulary professor at the Department of Medieval History at the Faculty of Humanities of the Eötvös Loránd University, Budapest. He is corresponding fellow of the American Academy of Arts and Sciences. He is also corresponding fellow of the Medieval Academy of America, Membre de l'Institut, Associé étranger, Académie des Inscriptions et Belles Lettres, Paris, and Honorary Fellow of the American Historical Association.

== Life Course ==
Klaniczay got his degree of history and English literature at Eötvös Loránd University, Budapest in 1974. He worked as editorial assistant at the review Világosság (1974–78), then as research assistant at the Institute for historical research of the Hungarian Academy of Sciences (1978–83). He taught sociology of fashion at the High School of Applied Arts, Budapest (1979–84). He joined then the Department of Medieval History of Eötvös Loránd University, where he served as head of the department between 1992 and 1995. Between 1989 and 1993 he was founding editor of the review Budapesti Könyvszemle / BUKSZ, which also had an English version between 1991 and 2004: Budapest Review of Books / BOOKS. In 1990-91 he was Fellow at the Wissenschaftskolleg zu Berlin, in 1992 Getty Scholar at Getty Center for Arts and Humanities, Santa Monica. In 1992 he founded the Department of Medieval Studies at the Central European University, Budapest, where he has been working ever since – he served as Head of this department in 1992–97, 2005-7 and 2019–21. Between 1997 and 2002 he was Rector of Collegium Budapest – Institute for Advanced Study, and remained Permanent Fellow until 2011, when the institute was closed down. In 2003-4 he was Fellow at the Center for Advanced Studies in the Behavioral Sciences, Stanford. In 2004 he was nominated University Professor at the CEU. In 2011-2012 he was Fellow at the Institut d'Études Avancées, Paris.

== Principal academic interests ==
Historical anthropology of European Christendom (sainthood, miracle beliefs, stigmata, visions, healing, magic, witchcraft); comparative cultural and religious history of Hungary and Central Europe, modern uses of Antiquity and Middle Ages

== Selected publications ==
- The Uses of Supernatural Power. The Transformations of the Popular Religion in Medieval and Early Modern Europe, Polity Press, Cambridge, 1990. ISBN 0-691-07377-5
- Holy Rulers and Blessed Princesses. Dynastic Cults in Medieval Central Europe. Cambridge University Press, Cambridge, 2002. ISBN 0521 42018 0
- (ed.) Procès de canonisation au Moyen Âge. Aspects juridiques et religieux – Medieval Canonization Processes. Legal and Religious Aspects. École française de Rome, Roma, 2004. ISBN 9782728307234
- (ed., with Éva Pócs) Communicating with the Spirits. Demons, Spirits, Witches I. CEU Press, Budapest, 2005. ISBN 963 7326 13 8
- (ed., with Éva Pócs) Christian Demonology and Popular Mythology. Demons, Spirits, Witches II, CEU Press, Budapest, 2006, ISBN 963-7326-76-6
- (ed., with Éva Pócs) Witchcraft Mythologies and Persecutions. Demons, Spirits, Witches III, CEU Press, Budapest, 2008, ISBN 978-963-7326-87-5
- (ed., with William A. Christian Jr.) The "Vision Thing". Studying Divine Intervention, Collegium Budapest Workshop Series 18, Budapest, 2009, ISBN 978 9639293 11 3
- (ed., with Michael Werner and Ottó Gecser) Multiple Antiquities - Multiple Modernities. Ancient Histories in Nineteenth Century European Cultures, Frankfurt - New York: Campus Verlag, 2011, ISBN 978-3-593-39101-4
- (ed.) Saints of the Christianization Age of Central Europe (Tenth-Eleventh Centuries). CEU Press, Budapest, 2013. ISBN 978-615-5225-20-8
- (ed., with Patrick Geary) Manufacturing the Middle Ages. Entangled History of Medievalism in Nineteenth-Century Europe, Brill, Leiden, 2013, ISBN 978-90-04-27680-2
- (ed., with György Karsai, David Movrin and Elżbieta Olechowska) Classics and Communism: Greek and Latin Classics behind the Iron Curtain, University of Ljubljana, Budapest, Ljubljana, Warsaw: 2013. ISBN 978-961-237-601-7
- (ed., with Éva Pócs)·Witchcraft and Demonology in Hungary and Transylvania, Palgrave – Macmillan, London and New York, 2017. ISBN 978-3-319-54755-8
- (ed., with Ildikó Csepregi and Bence Péterfi), The Oldest Legend, Acts of the Canonization Process and Miracles of Saint Margaret of Hungary, CEU Press, Budapest, 2018. ISBN 978-963-386-218-6
- Santità, miracoli, osservanze. L’Ungheria nel contesto europeo. Centro Italiano di Studi sull’Alto Medioevo, Spoleto, 2019. ISBN 978-88-6809-265-8
- (ed., with Pavlína Rychterová, Pawel Kras and Walter Pohl) Times of Upheaval. Four Medievalists in Twentieth-Century Central Europe. Conversations with Jerzy Kłoczowski, János M. Bak, František Šmahel and Herwig Wolfram. CEU Press, Budapest – New York, 2019. ISBN 978-963-386-305-3

== Awards, distinguished memberships and invitations ==
- 2007 – Special Prize from the Mayor of Budapest “Budapestért” for managing academic exchange in Collegium Budapest
- 2008 – Hungarian speaker in the series: 27 leçons d'histoire européenne par 27 des plus grands historiens de l'Union Européenne, arranged by the French Presidency of the EU in Paris
- 2014 – Membre correspondent étranger of the Académie des Inscriptions et Belles Lettres
- 2016 – International Prize for History ICHS (International Committee of Historical Sciences)
- 2017 – CEU Award for Outstanding Research
- 2018 – Corresponding Fellow of the American Academy of Arts and Sciences
- 2019 – Corresponding Fellow of the Medieval Academy of America
- 2022 – Membre de l'Institut, Associé étranger, Académie des Inscriptions et Belles Lettres, Paris
- 2024 – Honorary Fellow of the American Historical Association
