= Early modern Britain =

Period of history of the island of Great Britain

Early Modern Britain
- 1485–c.1815
Late Middle Ages	Modern Britain
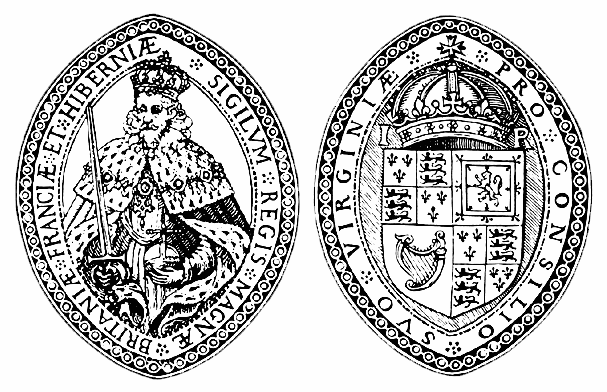
- Including: Tudor era; Stuart era; Georgian era
- Key events: Protestant reformation; English overseas possessions; English Civil War; Early Industrial Revolution

Early modern Britain is the history of the island of Great Britain roughly corresponding to the 16th, 17th and 18th centuries. Major historical events in early modern British history include numerous wars, especially with France, along with the English Renaissance, the English Reformation and Scottish Reformation, the English Civil War, the Restoration of Charles II, the Glorious Revolution, the Treaty of Union, the Scottish Enlightenment and the formation and the collapse of the First British Empire.

== England during the Tudor period (1485–1603) ==
=== English Renaissance ===
The term, "English Renaissance" is used by many historians to refer to a cultural movement in England in the 16th and 17th centuries that was heavily influenced by the Italian Renaissance. This movement is characterised by the flowering of English music (particularly the English adoption and development of the madrigal), notable achievements in drama (by William Shakespeare, Christopher Marlowe, and Ben Jonson), and the development of English epic poetry (most famously Edmund Spenser's The Faerie Queene).

The idea of the Renaissance has come under increased criticism by many cultural historians, and some have contended that the "English Renaissance" has no real tie with the artistic achievements and aims of the northern Italian artists (Leonardo, Michelangelo, Donatello) who are closely identified with the Renaissance.

Other cultural historians have countered that, regardless of whether the name "renaissance" is apt, there was undeniably an artistic flowering in England under the House of Tudor, culminating in Shakespeare and his contemporaries.

=== The rise of the Tudors ===
Some scholars date the beginning of Early Modern Britain to the end of the Wars of the Roses and the crowning of Henry Tudor in 1485 after his victory at the battle of Bosworth Field. Henry VII's largely peaceful reign ended decades of civil war and brought the peace and stability to England needed for art and commerce to thrive. A major war on English soil would not occur again until the English Civil War of the 17th century. The Wars of the Roses claimed an estimated 105,000 dead.

During this period Henry VII and his son Henry VIII greatly increased the power of the English monarchy. A similar pattern was unfolding on the continent as new technologies, such as gunpowder, and social and ideological changes undermined the power of the feudal nobility and enhanced that of the sovereign. Henry VIII also made use of the Protestant Reformation to usurp the power of the Roman Catholic Church, confiscating the property of the monasteries and declaring himself the head of the new Anglican Church. Under the Tudors, the English state was centralized and rationalized as a bureaucracy built up and the government became run and managed by educated functionaries. The most notable new institution was the Star Chamber.

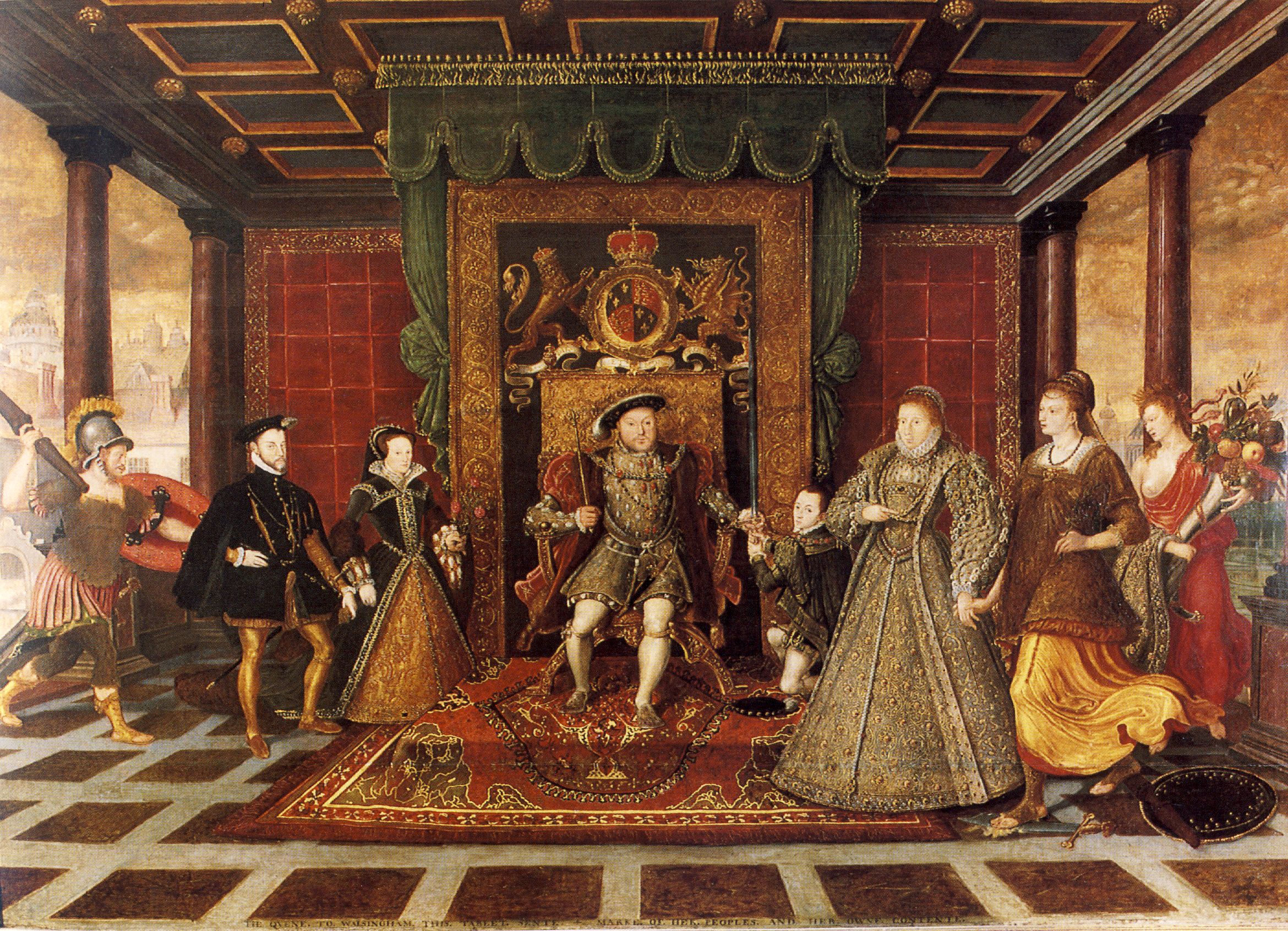
Allegory of the Tudor dynasty (detail), attributed to Lucas de Heere, c. 1572: left to right, Philip II of Spain, Mary, Henry VIII, Edward VI, Elizabeth I.

The new power of the monarch was given a basis by the notion of the divine right of kings to rule over their subjects. James I was a major proponent of this idea and wrote extensively on it.

The same forces that had reduced the power of the traditional aristocracy also served to increase the power of the commercial classes. The rise of trade and the central importance of money to the operation of the government gave this new class great power, but power that was not reflected in the government structure. This would lead to a long contest during the 17th century between the forces of the monarch and parliament.

=== Elizabethan era (1558–1603) ===
The Elizabethan Era is the reign of Queen Elizabeth I and is known to be a golden age in English history. It was the height of the English Renaissance and saw the flowering of English literature and poetry. This was also the time during which Elizabethan theatre was famous and William Shakespeare, among others, composed plays that broke away from England's past style of plays and theatre. It was an age of expansion and exploration abroad, while at home the Protestant Reformation became entrenched in the national mindset.

The Elizabethan Age is viewed so highly because of the contrasts with the periods before and after. It was a brief period of largely internal peace between the English Reformation and the battles between Protestants and Catholics and the battles between parliament and the monarchy that engulfed the 17th century. The Protestant/Catholic divide was settled, for a time, by the Elizabethan Religious Settlement, and parliament was not yet strong enough to challenge royal absolutism. England was also well-off compared to the other nations of Europe. The Italian Renaissance had come to an end under the weight of foreign domination of the peninsula. France was embroiled in its own religious battles that would only be settled in 1598 with the Edict of Nantes. In part because of this, but also because the English had been expelled from their last outposts on the continent, the centuries long conflict between France and England was largely suspended for most of Elizabeth's reign.

The one great rival was Spain, with which England conflicted both in Europe and the Americas in skirmishes that exploded into the Anglo-Spanish War (1585–1604). The conflict might be said to be the first world war, in that it was fought on two continents (Europe and the Americas) and two oceans (the Atlantic and, just barely, the Pacific).

England during this period had a centralised, well-organised, and effective government, largely a result of the reforms of Henry VII and Henry VIII. Economically, the country began to benefit greatly from the new era of trans-Atlantic trade.

== Scotland from 15th century to 1603 ==
Scotland advanced markedly in educational terms during the 15th century with the founding of the University of St Andrews in 1413, the University of Glasgow in 1450 and the University of Aberdeen in 1495, and with the passing of the Education Act 1496.

In 1468 the last great acquisition of Scottish territory occurred when James III married Margaret of Denmark, receiving the Orkney Islands and the Shetland Islands in payment of her dowry.

After the death of James III in 1488, during or after the Battle of Sauchieburn, his successor James IV successfully ended the quasi-independent rule of the Lord of the Isles, bringing the Western Isles under effective Royal control for the first time. In 1503, he married Henry VII's daughter, Margaret Tudor, thus laying the foundation for the 17th century Union of the Crowns. James IV's reign is often considered to be a period of cultural flourishing, and it was around this period that the European Renaissance began to infiltrate Scotland. James IV was the last Scottish king known to speak Gaelic, although some suggest his son could also.

In 1512, under a treaty extending the Auld Alliance, all nationals of Scotland and France also became nationals of each other's countries, a status not repealed in France until 1903 and which may never have been repealed in Scotland. However a year later, the Auld Alliance had more disastrous effects when James IV was required to launch an invasion of England to support the French when they were attacked by the English under Henry VIII. The invasion was stopped decisively at the battle of Flodden during which the King, many of his nobles, and over 10,000 troops—The Flowers of the Forest—were killed. The extent of the disaster impacted throughout Scotland because of the large numbers killed, and once again Scotland's government lay in the hands of regents. The song The Flooers o' the Forest commemorated this, an echo of the poem Y Gododdin on a similar tragedy in about 600.

James V escaped from the custody of the regents and the Douglas family with the aid of his mother Margaret Tudor in 1528. He once again set about subduing the rebellious Highlands, Western and Northern isles, as his father had had to do. He married the French princess Madeleine of Valois] and secondly, the French noblewoman Mary of Guise. His reign was fairly successful, until another disastrous campaign against England led to defeat at the battle of Solway Moss (1542). James died a short time later. The day before his death, he was brought news of the birth of an heir: a daughter, who became Mary, Queen of Scots. James is supposed to have remarked in Scots that "it cam wi a lass, it will gang wi a lass"—referring to the House of Stewart which began with Walter Stewart's marriage to the daughter of Robert the Bruce. Once again, Scotland was in the hands of a regent, James Hamilton, Earl of Arran.

=== Mary, Queen of Scots ===
The war known as the Rough Wooing, Henry VIII's military attempt to force a marriage between Mary and his son, Edward began after the failure of the Treaty of Greenwich. There was border skirmishing and in May 1544, a large English army burnt Edinburgh. In 1547, forces under the English regent Edward Seymour, 1st Duke of Somerset were victorious at the Battle of Pinkie, the climax of the Rough Wooing, and followed up by occupying Haddington.

Mary was sent to France at the age of five, as the intended bride of the heir to the French throne. Her mother, Mary of Guise, stayed in Scotland to look after the interests of Mary and of France, while the Earl of Arran continued to act as Regent. Mary returned to Scotland after the death of her husband, Francis II of France.

In 1567, Mary lost control of Scotland after seven years of personal rule, and was imprisoned for a time in Lochleven Castle and forced to abdicate. She escaped and attempted to regain the throne by force. After her defeat at the Battle of Langside in 1568 she took refuge in England, leaving her young son, James VI, in the hands of regents. In England she became a focal point for Catholic conspirators and was eventually executed on the orders of her kinswoman Elizabeth I.

=== Protestant Reformation ===
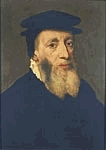
In 1559 John Knox returned from ministering in Geneva to lead the Calvinist reformation in Scotland.

During the 16th century, Scotland underwent a Protestant Reformation. In the earlier part of the century, the teachings of first Martin Luther and then John Calvin began to influence Scotland. The execution of a number of Protestant preachers, most notably the Lutheran influenced Patrick Hamilton in 1528 and later the proto-Calvinist George Wishart in 1546 who was burnt at the stake in St. Andrews by Cardinal Beaton for heresy, did nothing to stem the growth of these ideas. Beaton was assassinated shortly after the execution of George Wishart.

The eventual Reformation of the Scottish Church followed a brief civil war in 1559–60, in which English intervention at the siege of Leith on the Protestant side was decisive. A Reformed confession of faith was adopted by Parliament in 1560, while the young Mary, Queen of Scots, was still in France. The most influential figure was John Knox, who had been a disciple of both John Calvin and George Wishart. Roman Catholicism was not eliminated, and remained strong particularly in parts of the highlands.

The Reformation remained somewhat precarious through the reign of Queen Mary, who remained Roman Catholic but tolerated Protestantism. Following her deposition in 1567, her infant son James VI was crowned at Stirling and raised as a Protestant. In 1603, following the death of the childless Queen Elizabeth I, the crown of England passed to James. He took the title James I of England and James VI of Scotland, thus unifying these two countries under his personal rule. For a time, this remained the only political connection between two independent nations, but it foreshadowed the eventual 1707 union of Scotland and England under the banner of the Great Britain.

== Early Stuart era: 1603–1660 ==
=== Union of the Crowns ===
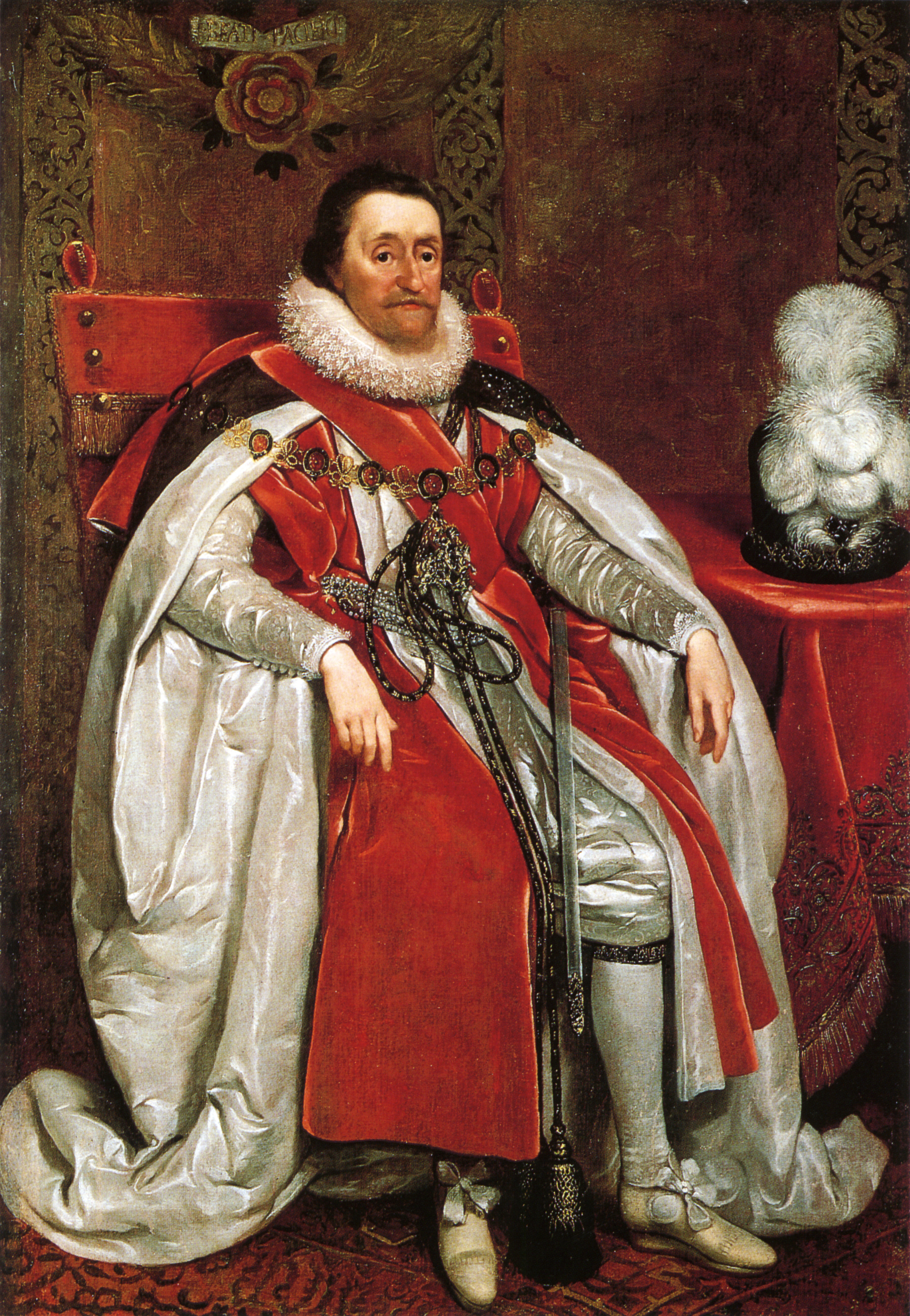
James I of England by Daniël Mijtens (1621).

The Union of the Crowns refers to the accession of James VI, King of Scots, to the throne as King James I of England while remaining King James VI of Scotland. One man ruled two separate kingdoms with separate governments and cabinets. The two countries remained distinct and separate until the Acts of Union 1707. Within eight hours of the death of Elizabeth, James was proclaimed king in London, the news received without protest or disturbance.

The Jacobean era refers to the years of the reign of James I in England, 1603–1625. The Jacobean era succeeds the Elizabethan era and precedes the Caroline era, and specifically denotes a style of architecture, visual arts, decorative arts, and literature that is predominant of that period.

The Caroline era refers to the years of the reign of King Charles I over both countries, 1625–1642. It was followed by the English Civil War (1642–1651) and the English Interregnum (1651–1660), when there was no king.

=== English Civil War ===
The English Civil War consisted of a series of armed conflicts and political machinations that took place between Parliamentarians (known as Roundheads) and Royalists (known as Cavaliers) between 1642 and 1651. The first (1642–1646) and second (1648–1649) civil wars pitted the supporters of King Charles I against the supporters of the Long Parliament, while the third war (1649–1651) saw fighting between supporters of King Charles II and supporters of the Rump Parliament. The Civil War ended with the Parliamentary victory at the Battle of Worcester on 3 September 1651. The Diggers were a group begun by Gerrard Winstanley in 1649 who attempted to reform the existing social order with an agrarian lifestyle based upon their ideas for the creation of small egalitarian rural communities. They were one of a number of nonconformist dissenting groups that emerged around this time.

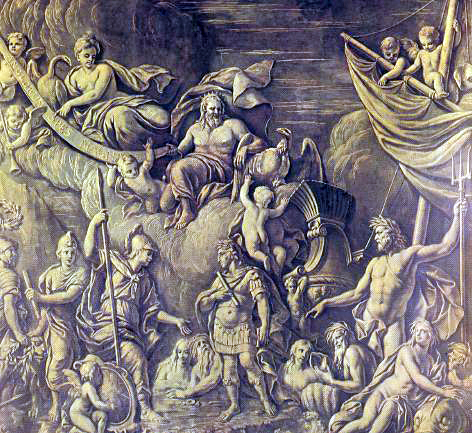
The Arrival of William III by Sir James Thornhill. William III landed in England on 5 November (Guy Fawkes Night) 1688.

The English Interregnum was the period of parliamentary and military rule in the land occupied by modern-day England and Wales after the English Civil War. It began with the regicide of Charles I in 1649 and ended with the restoration of Charles II in 1660.

=== Protectorate 1653–1660 ===
The Civil War led to the trial and execution of Charles I, the exile of his son Charles II, and the replacement of the English monarchy with first the Commonwealth of England (1649–1653) and then with The Protectorate (1653–1659), under the personal rule of Oliver Cromwell. Upon his death, his ill-prepared son Richard Cromwell took over, with very little support. The military and religious elements that supported Cromwell began disputing with each other.

== Later Stuart era: 1660–1714 ==
=== Restoration 1660–1688 ===
In 1660, the remaining members of the Long Parliament (1640–1660) rejected the anarchy and confusion since Cromwell's death. Elite and popular opinion called for a restoration of the monarchy under the Stuarts. There was widespread revulsion against the intense moralism and high taxes of the Rule of the Major-Generals in 1657. Nostalgia for Royal traditionalism was strong. Gen. George Monck, a former supporter of Cromwell, led the movement for a royal restoration. Charles II in exile paid close attention to the developments and readied himself to take the throne. From Breda in Holland he issued the Declaration of Breda, promising generosity and indicating his willingness to leave the settlement to Parliament. The Convention Parliament, which had been elected to negotiate with the King, invited Charles to return. He landed at Dover amid great enthusiasm on May 26, 1660.

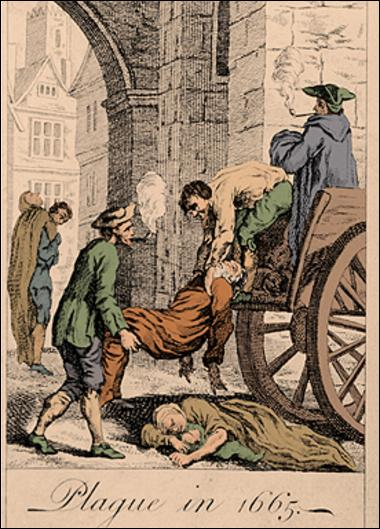
Collecting the dead for burial during the Great Plague.

The new parliament, known as the Cavalier Parliament enacted the Clarendon Code, designed to shore up the position of the re-established Church of England. Strict rules were set up such that only genuine members of the established Church could hold office. The major foreign policy issue was the trade rivalry with the Dutch, leading to the inconclusive Second Anglo-Dutch War of 1665–67. The only positive result was the acquisition of New Netherland, which became New York.

Coincidental with the war with the Dutch was the Great Plague of London of 1665–66, which at its worst cost 1000 deaths a day in London. On top of that, the Great Fire of London burned out the main commercial districts of London; it destroyed 13,000 buildings, but few lives were lost. In 1670, King Charles entered into the Secret Treaty of Dover, an alliance with his first cousin King Louis XIV. Louis agreed to aid him in the Third Anglo-Dutch War and pay him a pension, and Charles secretly promised to convert to Catholicism at an unspecified future date; he did so on his deathbed. Charles attempted to introduce religious equality for Catholics and non-Anglican Protestant dissenters with his 1672 Royal Declaration of Indulgence.

Elite opinion rejected it and Parliament forced him to withdraw it. In 1679, Titus Oates's highly exaggerated revelations of a supposed "Popish Plot" sparked the Exclusion Crisis when it was revealed that Charles's brother and heir (James, Duke of York) was a Catholic. The issue was whether or not to exclude James from succession to the throne. The crisis sparked the creation of the first political parties: the pro-exclusion Whig Party demanded that James never reach the throne. The anti-exclusion Tory party believed it was against God's will to interfere with the legitimate succession, and supported both the King and James. After the discovery of the failed 1683 Rye House Plot to murder Charles and James, some Whig leaders were executed or forced into exile. Charles dissolved Parliament in 1681, and ruled alone until his death on 6 February 1685.

=== Glorious Revolution 1688–89 ===
When Charles II died in 1685, his brother became King James II; he ruled with the support of the Tory party. He forced a series of highly unpopular proposals that would restore Catholicism to England. The Monmouth Rebellion broke out in western areas that was brutally suppressed. Elite opinion strongly turned against the king, and in late 1688 the elites invited William III and Mary II to govern. James went into exile in France, where his claims to the English throne were promoted by his ally King Louis XIV. In England the claims were upheld by the Jacobite faction of Tories, who in alliance with France were a military threat to the throne for the next half-century.

William III ruled 1689–1702, while his wife Queen Mary II was the nominal co-ruler until her death in 1694. Constitutionally, the Glorious Revolution established a precedent that British monarchs could not govern without the consent of Parliament, as enacted through the Glorious Revolution of 1688, the passage of the English Bill of Rights, and the Hanoverian succession.

==== Anglo-Dutch Wars ====
The Anglo-Dutch Wars were a series of three wars which took place between the English and the Dutch from 1652 to 1674. The causes included political disputes and increasing competition from merchant shipping. Religion was not a factor, since both sides were Protestant. The British in the first war (1652–54) had the naval advantage with larger numbers of more powerful "ships of the line" which were well suited to the naval tactics of the era. The British also captured numerous Dutch merchant ships. In the second war (1665–67) Dutch naval victories followed. This second war cost London ten times more than it had planned on, and the king sued for peace in 1667 with the Treaty of Breda. It ended the fights over "mercantilism" (the use of force to protect and expand national trade, industry, and shipping). Meanwhile, the French were building up fleets that threatened both the Netherlands and Great Britain. In the third war (1672–74), the British counted on a new alliance with France but the outnumbered Dutch outsailed both of them, and King Charles II ran short of money and political support. The Dutch gained domination of sea trading routes until 1713. The British gained the thriving colony of New Netherland, and renamed it New York.

== 18th century ==
The 18th century was characterised by numerous major wars, especially with France, with the growth and collapse of the First British Empire, with the origins of the Second British Empire, and with steady economic and social growth at home.

Peace between England and the Netherlands in 1688 meant that the two countries entered the Nine Years' War as allies, but the conflict – waged in Europe and overseas between France, Spain and the Anglo-Dutch alliance – left the English a stronger colonial power than the Dutch, who were forced to devote a larger proportion of their military budget on the costly land war in Europe. The 18th century would see England (after 1707, Great Britain) rise to be the world's dominant colonial power, and France becoming its main rival on the imperial stage.

In 1701, England, Portugal and the Netherlands sided with the Holy Roman Empire against Spain and France in the War of the Spanish Succession. The conflict, which France and Spain were to lose, lasted until 1714. The British Empire was territorially enlarged: from France, gaining Newfoundland and Acadia, and from Spain, Gibraltar and Menorca. Gibraltar, which is still part of the British Overseas Territories to this day, became a critical naval base and allowed Britain to control the Atlantic entry and exit point to the Mediterranean.

=== Treaty of Union ===
The united Kingdom of Great Britain was born on May 1, 1707, shortly after the parliaments of Scotland and England had ratified the Treaty of Union of 1706 by each approving Acts of Union combining the two parliaments and the two royal titles. Deeper political integration had been a key policy of Queen Anne (reigned 1702–14). Under the aegis of the Queen and her advisors a Treaty of Union was drawn up, and negotiations between England and Scotland began in earnest in 1706.

Scottish proponents of union believed that failure to accede to the Bill would result in the imposition of union under less favourable terms, and months of fierce debate in both capital cities and throughout both kingdoms followed. In Scotland, the debate on occasion dissolved into civil disorder, most notably by the notorious 'Edinburgh Mob'. The prospect of a union of the kingdoms was deeply unpopular among the Scottish population at large, and talk of an uprising was widespread. However Scotland could not long continue. Following the financially disastrous Darien scheme, the near-bankrupt Parliament of Scotland reluctantly accepted the proposals. Supposed financial payoffs to Scottish parliamentarians were later referred to by Robert Burns when he wrote "We're bought and sold for English gold, Such a Parcel of Rogues in a Nation! Recent historians, however, have emphasised the legitimacy of the vote.

The Acts of Union took effect in 1707, uniting the separate Parliaments and crowns of England and Scotland and forming the single Kingdom of Great Britain. Queen Anne (already Queen of both England and Scotland) became formally the first occupant of the unified British throne, with Scotland sending forty-five Members to join all existing Members from the parliament of England in the new House of Commons of Great Britain, as well as 16 Scottish representative peers to join all existing peers from the parliament of England in the new House of Lords.

=== Jacobite risings ===
Dynastic security was a factor in Britain, as, indeed, it was in other countries. The House of Stuart had abdicated the throne when King James II (1633–1701) fled to France in 1688. However he and his son James Francis Edward Stuart claimed to be the legitimate kings, and had the support of important elements in England, as well as King Louis XIV. The main issue was religion; the Stuarts had the support of Catholic Europe, while the Whigs in Britain were staunch opponents of Catholicism. The great majority of Tories refused to support the Jacobites publicly, although there were numerous quiet supporters. After the death of King William III (1702) and Queen Anne (1714), the succession went to the Protestant House of Hanover, starting with King George I in 1714. They were Germans who were not especially popular in Britain. The island nation was vulnerable only to a seaborne invasion, which the Jacobites plotted and attempted. The major attempts were the Jacobite rising of 1715 and the Jacobite rising of 1745. Both failed to rally significant popular support, and the Jacobite defeat at the Battle of Culloden in 1746 ending any realistic hope of a Stuart restoration. Historian Basil Williams concludes, "there was never any serious danger to the dynasty."

=== Overseas trade ===
The era was prosperous as entrepreneurs extended the range of their business around the globe. By the 1720s Britain was one of the most prosperous countries in the world, and Daniel Defoe boasted:

We are the most "diligent nation in the world. Vast trade, rich manufactures, mighty wealth, universal correspondence, and happy success have been constant companions of England, and given us the title of an industrious people."

While the other major powers were primarily motivated toward territorial gains, and protection of their dynasties (such as the Habsburg and Bourbon dynasties, and the House of Hohenzollern), Britain had a different set of primary interests. Its main diplomatic goal (besides protecting the homeland from invasion) was building a worldwide trading network for its merchants, manufacturers, shippers and financiers. This required a hegemonic Royal Navy so powerful that no rival could sweep its ships from the world's trading routes, or invade the British Isles. The London government enhanced the private sector by incorporating numerous privately financed London-based companies for establishing trading posts and opening import-export businesses across the world. Each was given a monopoly of trade to the specified geographical region. The first enterprise was the Muscovy Company set up in 1555 to trade with Russia. Other prominent enterprises included the East India Company, and the Hudson's Bay Company in Canada.

The Company of Royal Adventurers Trading to Africa had been set up in 1662 to trade in gold, ivory and slaves in Africa; it was reestablished as the Royal African Company in 1672 and focused on the slave trade. British involvement in the triangular slave trade paid off handsomely in terms of its profits. Even the loss of the 13 colonies was made up by a very favorable trading relationship with the new United States of America. British gained dominance in the trade with India, and largely dominated the highly lucrative slave, sugar, and commercial trades originating in West Africa and the West Indies. China would be next on the agenda. Other powers set up similar monopolies on a much smaller scale; only the Netherlands emphasized trade as much as England. British exports soared from £6.5 million in 1700, to £14.7 million in 1760 and £43.2 million in 1800.

There was one major fiasco that caused heavy losses. The South Sea Bubble was a business enterprise that exploded in scandal. The South Sea Company was a private business corporation supposedly set up much like the other trading companies, with a focus on South America. Its actual purpose was to renegotiate previous high-interest government loans amounting to £31 million through market manipulation and speculation. It issued stock four times in 1720 that reached about 8,000 investors. Prices kept soaring every day, from £130 a share to £1,000, with insiders making huge paper profits. The Bubble collapsed overnight, ruining many speculators. Investigations showed bribes had reached into high places—even to the king. His chief minister Robert Walpole managed to wind it down with minimal political and economic damage, although some losers fled to exile or committed suicide.

=== Slave trade ===
An important result of the Treaty of Utrecht was the enlarging of Britain's role in the slave trade. Of special importance was the successful secret negotiation with France to obtain thirty-year monopoly on the Spanish slave trade, known as the Asiento de Negros. Anne also allowed colonies like Virginia to make laws that promoted black slavery. Anne had secretly negotiated with France to get its approval regarding the Asiento. She boasted to Parliament of her success in taking the Asiento away from France and London celebrated her economic coup. Most of the slave trade involved sales to Spanish colonies in the Caribbean, and to Mexico, as well as sales to British colonies in the Caribbean and in North America.

Historian Vinita Ricks says the agreement allotted Queen Anne "22.5% (and King Philip V, of Spain 28%) of all profits collected for her personal fortune." Ricks concludes that the Queen's "connection to slave trade revenue meant that she was no longer a neutral observer. She had a vested interest in what happened on slave ships." In addition to sales to the Spanish colonies, Britain had its own sugar islands in the Caribbean, especially Jamaica, Barbados, Nevis, and Antigua, which provided a steady flow of profits from the slave labor that produced the sugar.

=== Warfare and finance ===
From 1700 to 1850, Britain was involved in 137 wars or rebellions. Apart from losing the American Revolutionary War, it was generally successful in warfare, and was especially successful in financing its military commitments. France and Spain, by contrast, went bankrupt. Britain maintained a relatively large and expensive Royal Navy, along with a small standing army. When the need arose for soldiers it hired mercenaries or financed allies who fielded armies. The rising costs of warfare forced a shift in government financing from the income from royal agricultural estates and special imposts and taxes to reliance on customs and excise taxes and, after 1790, an income tax. Working with bankers in the City, the government raised large loans during wartime and paid them off in peacetime. The rise in taxes amounted to 20% of national income, but the private sector benefited from the increase in economic growth. The demand for war supplies stimulated the industrial sector, particularly naval supplies, munitions and textiles, which gave Britain an advantage in international trade during the postwar years.

=== British Empire ===
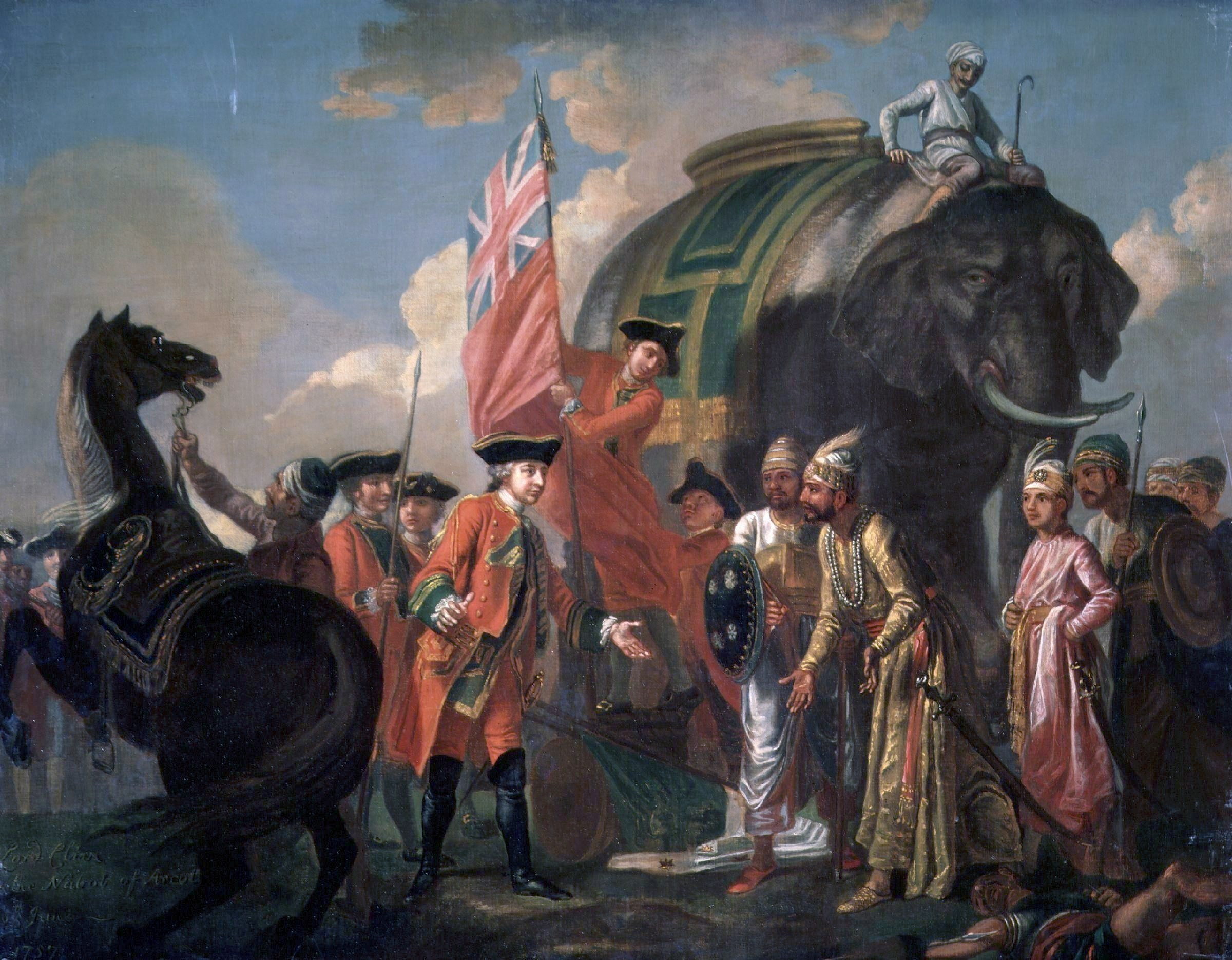
Lord Clive meeting with Mir Jafar after the Battle of Plassey, by Francis Hayman (c. 1762).

The Seven Years' War, which began in 1756, was the first war waged on a global scale, fought in Europe, India, North America, the Caribbean, the Philippines and coastal Africa. The signing of the Treaty of Paris (1763) had important consequences for Britain and its empire. In North America, France's future as a colonial power there was effectively ended with the ceding of New France to Britain (leaving a sizeable French-speaking population under British control) and Louisiana to Spain. Spain ceded Florida to Britain. In India, the Carnatic War had left France still in control of its enclaves but with military restrictions and an obligation to support British client states, effectively leaving the future of India to Britain. The British victory over France in the Seven Years' War therefore left Britain as the world's dominant colonial power.

During the 1760s and 1770s, relations between the Thirteen Colonies and Britain became increasingly strained, primarily because of resentment of the British Parliament's ability to tax American colonists without their consent. Disagreement turned to violence and in 1775 the American Revolutionary War began. The following year, the colonists declared the independence of the United States and with economic and naval assistance from France, would go on to win the war in 1783. The Treaties of Versailles were signed, also ending war with the French and Spanish. The Fourth Anglo-Dutch War ended the following year.

The loss of the United States, at the time Britain's most populous colony, is seen by historians as the event defining the transition between the "first" and "second" empires, in which Britain shifted its attention away from the Americas to Asia, the Pacific and later Africa. Adam Smith's The Wealth of Nations, published in 1776, had argued that colonies were redundant, and that free trade should replace the old mercantilist policies that had characterised the first period of colonial expansion, dating back to the protectionism of Spain and Portugal. The growth of trade between the newly independent United States and Britain after 1783 confirmed Smith's view that political control was not necessary for economic success.

During its 1st century of operation, the focus of the British East India Company had been trade, not the building of an empire in India. Company interests turned from trade to territory during the 18th century as the Mughal Empire declined in power and the British East India Company struggled with its French counterpart, La Compagnie française des Indes orientales, during the Carnatic Wars of the 1740s and 1750s. The Battle of Plassey, which saw the British, led by Robert Clive, defeat the French and their Indian allies, left the Company in control of Bengal and a major military and political power in India. In the following decades it gradually increased the size of the territories under its control, either ruling directly or indirectly via local puppet rulers under the threat of force of the Indian Army, 80% of which was composed of native Indian sepoys.

In 1770, James Cook became the first European to visit the eastern coast of Australia whilst on a scientific voyage to the South Pacific. In 1778, Joseph Banks, Cook's botanist on the voyage, presented evidence to the government on the suitability of Botany Bay for the establishment of a penal settlement, and in 1787 the first shipment of convicts set sail, arriving in 1788.

At the threshold to the 19th century, Britain was challenged again by France under Napoleon, in a struggle that, unlike previous wars, represented a contest of ideologies between the two nations.

It was not only Britain's position on the world stage that was threatened: Napoleon threatened invasion of Britain itself, and with it, a fate similar to the countries of continental Europe that his armies had overrun. The Napoleonic Wars were therefore ones that Britain invested large amounts of capital and resources to win. French ports were blockaded by the Royal Navy, which won a decisive victory over the French fleet at Trafalgar in 1805.

=== Growth of state power ===
Recently historians have undertaken a deeper exploration of the growth of state power. They especially look at the long 18th century, from about 1660 to 1837 from four fresh perspectives. The first approach, developed by Oliver MacDonagh, presented an expansive and centralized administrative state while deemphasizing the influence of Benthamite utilitarianism.

The second approach, as developed by Edward Higgs, conceptualizes the state as an information-gathering entity, paying special attention to local registrars and the census. He brings in such topics as spies, surveillance of Catholics, the 1605 Gunpowder Plot led by Guy Fawkes to overthrow the government, and the Poor Laws, and demonstrates similarities to the surveillance society of the 21st century.

John Brewer introduced the third approach with his depiction of the unexpectedly powerful, centralized 'fiscal-military' state during the eighteenth century. Finally, there have been numerous recent studies that explore the state as an abstract entity capable of commanding the loyalties of those people over whom it rules.

== See also ==
- British colonization of the Americas
- Caroline era, 1625–1642
- Company rule in India
- Early Modern English literature
- Early modern period
- Elizabethan era, 1558–1603
- English Civil War, 1642–1651
- Territorial evolution of the British Empire
- History of Scotland
- Historiography of the United Kingdom
- Historiography of the British Empire
- International relations (1648–1814)
- Interregnum (England), 1649–1660
- Jacobean era, 1603–1625 in England, 1567–1625 in Scotland
- Witchcraft in early modern Britain
