= Wolfgang Behringer =

German historian

- Born: July 17, 1956 (age 70); Munich, Germany
- Occupation: Historian

Academic background
- Education: LMU Munich

Academic work
- Discipline: History
- Sub-discipline: Early Modern History, environmental History
- Institutions: LMU Munich; University of York; University of Bonn; Saarland University
- Main interests: Witchcraft beliefs, cultural history of climate, Shamanism
- Notable works: Shaman of Oberstdorf (1998); A Cultural History of Climate (2000)

Wolfgang Behringer (born 17 July 1956 in Munich) is a German historian specialising in the witchcraft beliefs of Early Modern Europe. He has worked at LMU Munich, University of York and the University of Bonn as well as published multiple books. He is the author of the book Shaman of Oberstdorf. He also authored A Cultural History of Climate. First published in German in 2000, it was translated into English in 2009. Since 2003, Behringer teaches at Saarland University.

== Works ==
- Behringer, Wolfgang; Verlag C.H. Beck (2022). Der große Aufbruch Globalgeschichte der frühen Neuzeit (in German). München. ISBN 978-3-406-78344-9. OCLC 1282191950.
- Behringer, Wolfgang; Verlag C.H. Beck (2022). Kulturgeschichte des Klimas Von der Eiszeit bis zur globalen Erwärmung (in German). München. ISBN 978-3-406-79655-5. OCLC 1340415196.
- Behringer, Wolfgang (2012). Kulturgeschichte des Sports : vom antiken Olympia bis zur Gegenwart (in German). München. ISBN 978-3-406-63206-8. OCLC 867652664.
- Behringer, Wolfgang (2015). Tambora und das Jahr ohne Sommer : wie ein Vulkan die Welt in die Krise stürzte (in German). München. ISBN 978-3-406-67616-1. OCLC 922072445.
- Behringer, Wolfgang (2019). Tambora and the year without a summer : how a volcano plunged the world into crisis. Translated by Selwyn, Pamela E. Cambridge. ISBN 978-1-5095-2549-2. OCLC 1049576849.
- Behringer, Wolfgang (1997). Die Spaten-Brauerei 1397-1997 : die Geschichte eines Münchner Unternehmens vom Mittelalter bis zur Gegenwart (in German). München: Piper. ISBN 3-492-03600-7. OCLC 38524594.
- Behringer, Wolfgang (1997). Hexenverfolgung in Bayern : Volksmagie, Glaubenseifer und Staatsräson in der Frühen Neuzeit (in German). München: R. Oldenbourg. ISBN 3-486-53903-5. OCLC 39265902.
- Behringer, Wolfgang (1990). Thurn und Taxis : die Geschichte ihrer Post und ihrer Unternehmen (in German). München: Piper. ISBN 3-492-03336-9. OCLC 22813659.
- Behringer, Wolfgang; Ott-Koptschalijski, Constance (1991). Der Traum vom Fliegen : zwischen Mythos und Technik (in German). Frankfurt am Main: S. Fischer. ISBN 3-10-007106-9. OCLC 25412834.
- Behringer, Wolfgang (1991). Löwenbrau : von den Anfängen des Münchner Brauwesens bis zur Gegenwart (in German). München: Suddeutscher Verlag. ISBN 3-7991-6471-5. OCLC 27174159.
- Behringer, Wolfgang (1988). Mit dem Feuer vom Leben zum Tod : Hexengesetzgebung in Bayern (in German). München: Hugendubel. ISBN 3-88034-393-4. OCLC 22731895.
- Behringer, Wolfgang (1998). Shaman of Oberstdorf : Chonrad Stoeckhlin and the phantoms of the night. University Press of Virginia. ISBN 978-0-8139-1788-7. OCLC 44957893.
- Behringer, Wolfgang; Camiller, Patrick (2010). A cultural history of climate. Cambridge, UK: Polity. ISBN 978-0-7456-4528-5. OCLC 317453586.

== Criticism ==
Behringer's book, A Cultural History of Climate makes numerous negative references to climate scientists, which has resulted in concerns of factual inaccuracies and possible bias. For example, page 14 of the original version of the book in German depicts a cartoon from controversial cartoonist Götz Weidenroth depicting climate scientists financially profiting from speaking up about the anthropogenic causes of climate change. On page 104 he makes reference to 3 °C temperature increase in springtime temperatures in the early Middle Ages (1170 to 1310) in Europe and then compares this to an apparently lower rise in temperatures between 1891 and 1960. Without providing references this seems to be cherry picking of the data in order to make an unsubstantiated claim. Furthermore, on page 288 Behringer makes the claim that climate change has been historically good for humanity while appealing for calm. He claims that we will simply adapt to a changing climate without citing any scientific sources.

An extensive critique of Behringer's book has recently been published on the peer-reviewed Journal of Environmental Studies and Sciences.
