= Gwen ferch Ellis =

First woman on record tried for witchcraft in Wales

Gwen
- Gwen ferch Ellis
- Born: c. 1552; Llandyrnog, Wales
- Died: 1594; Denbigh Town Square, Wales
- Cause of death: Hanging
- Occupations: Spinner; Linen-maker
- Known for: First woman on record to be both tried and executed for witchcraft in Wales
- Criminal charge: Witchcraft
- Criminal penalty: Death
- Parent: Ellis (father)

Gwen ferch Ellis (lit. trans. "Gwen the daughter of Ellis"; c. 1552 – 1594) was born in Llandyrnog in the Vale of Clwyd. Ellis was the first person in Wales to be executed under the Witchcraft Act 1562 in 1594 by hanging before the year's end.

The record of Gwen ferch Ellis' trial is the earliest mention of witchcraft trial and execution in Wales.

== Early years ==
Gwen ferch Ellis was born in the parish of Llandyrnog in c. 1552. Her parents' names are not recorded, other than her father's Christian name, Ellis. She had a sister named Elizabeth. At a young age she was sent to live with her uncle Harry ap Roger and remained in his care until she married.

== Marriages ==
Gwen ferch Ellis was married three times in total. Her first husband, Lewis ap David ap Gwyn, died after two years of marriage. She married a miller called Lewis ap David ap Gruffith Gethin (Lewis Gethin). The couple moved to his mill at Llanelian-yn-Rhos and were living there in 1588. After 18 years of marriage, her second husband also died. In 1592, Gwen married John ap Morrice from the neighbouring parish of Betws yn Rhos and settled there. The fate of her third husband is unknown, although he was not mentioned during her trial.

== Accusation ==
Gwen enters the historical record in 1594 when she was examined by William Hughes (Bishop of St Asaph), on suspicion of charming. The records of the examination reveal that Gwen made her living by spinning and making linen cloth. She explained that she was also a healer. She made salves and plasters and other remedies for the treatment of animals. This she did in return for small gifts of food or goods. She also attended the sick, including children and, so she stated, had been using charms to help heal and provide protection.

=== The charm ===
The use of verbal or written charms was not uncommon in Wales and other parts of Great Britain, but the particular case in which Gwen was implicated stood out for several reasons. A written charm was found at the home of Thomas Mostyn, one of the foremost gentlemen of north Wales. The charm was also written backwards, which, according to the traditions of the time, meant that it was intended as a destructive spell rather than one for healing. Gwen was implicated because of her association with Jane Conway of Marle, near Conwy, who seems to have had some quarrel with Mostyn.

== Trial and execution ==
Following her examination by the bishop, local magistrates were given the power to examine witnesses willing to testify against Gwen. Five men and two women came forward with accusations of witchcraft against her. She was accused of causing the madness of a child, and of murdering a sick man who died shortly after being treated by Gwen. She was also accused of having a vengeful nature, all through the use of witchcraft. Later in 1594, Gwen was tried on these charges and found guilty. She was executed by hanging in Denbigh town square before the end of the year.
