= Éva Pócs =

Hungarian anthropologist, historian, ethnographer

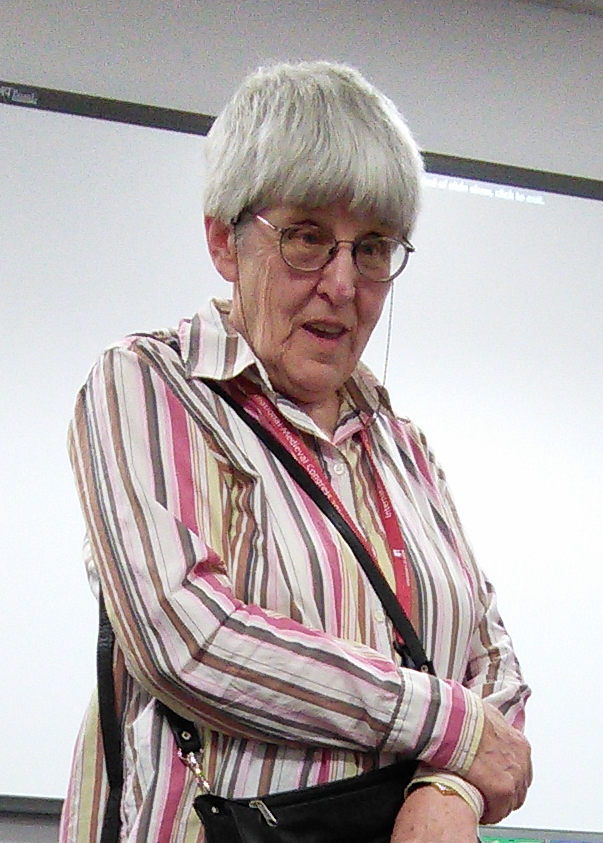
Éva Pócs, taken at the International Medieval Congress, 2014

Éva Pócs (born 1936) is a Hungarian ethnographer and folklorist.

== Education and academic career ==
Éva Pócs was born in 1936. She is the younger sister of botanist Tamás Pócs (born 1936). She began her career at the Néprajzi Múzeum where she was an intern between 1959 and 1960. On gaining her first degree in 1960 in Hungarian Folklore, Museology, and Secondary School Teaching from Eötvös Loránd University (ELTE), she joined the curatorial staff of the Damjanich János Múzeum in Szolnok. Between 1965 and 1968 Pócs worked as a graduate researcher (aspirantúra) in the Department of Folklore at ELTE.

Following her studies at ELTE, Pócs joined the Hungarian Academy of Sciences (MTA Néprajzi Kutatóintézete), where she was a fellow between 1968 and 1989, and then as Head of department for the Institute of Ethnography from 1990 until she took partial retirement in 2001. She received her PhD degree in ethnology (folklore) in 1982 and her DSc in 1998. During her time at MTA Néprajzi Kutatóintézete, Pócs also lectured for the University of Szeged between 1991 and 1999. Following her partial retirement in 2001, she continued to work as a senior research fellow at MTA Néprajzi Kutatóintézete. Between 1999 and 2007 she was Professor of Cultural Anthropology at Janus Pannonius University (PTE) in Pécs, Hungary, and since 2008 she has been professor emeritus.

Pócs has lectured at many European universities, including Berlin, Stockholm, Lund, London, York, Edinburgh, and Helsinki.

She is an author of several books dealing with supernatural beliefs and patterns of communication in early modern Europe.

== Awards ==
Pócs has received a number of awards and scholarships over her career.

- 1972: Jankó János prize (Hungarian Ethnographic Society)
- 1995: Pro Scientia prize and medal
- 1995: István Györffy medal (Hungarian Ethnographic Society)
- 1998: "Year of Outstanding Intellectual Creation" prize (University of Pécs)
- 2000: Jenő Szűcs Prize (Soros Foundation)
- 2002: Gyula Ortutay medal (Hungarian Ethnographic Society)
- 2003: "Year of Outstanding Intellectual Creation" prize (University of Pécs)
- 2004: Herder Prize
- 2009: Honorary membership of the International Society for Folk Narrative Research (ISFNR)

Pócs is a past president of the Folklore Section of the Hungarian Ethnographic Society^{hu} (a post currently held by Dániel Bárth).

== Publications ==
Her publications in English include:

- Fairies and Witches at the Boundary of South-Eastern and Central Europe (1989)
- Between the Living and the Dead: A Perspective on Witches and Seers in the Early Modern Age (1999)
- (co-author) Communicating with the Spirits (2005)
- (editor) Witchcraft, Mythologies and Persecution, with Gabor Klaniczay.
- (editor) Christian Demonology And Popular Mythology : Demons, Spirits, Witches, with Gabor Klaniczay.

Fairies and Witches was deemed an "important monograph" on the subject of the link between folklore on fairies and belief in witches, by Hilda Ellis Davidson, especially as it covered the folklore in regions such as Hungary and Southwestern Europe whose language are "Europe not normally accessible" to many readers.
