= Natalia Ginzburg =

Italian author (1916–1991)

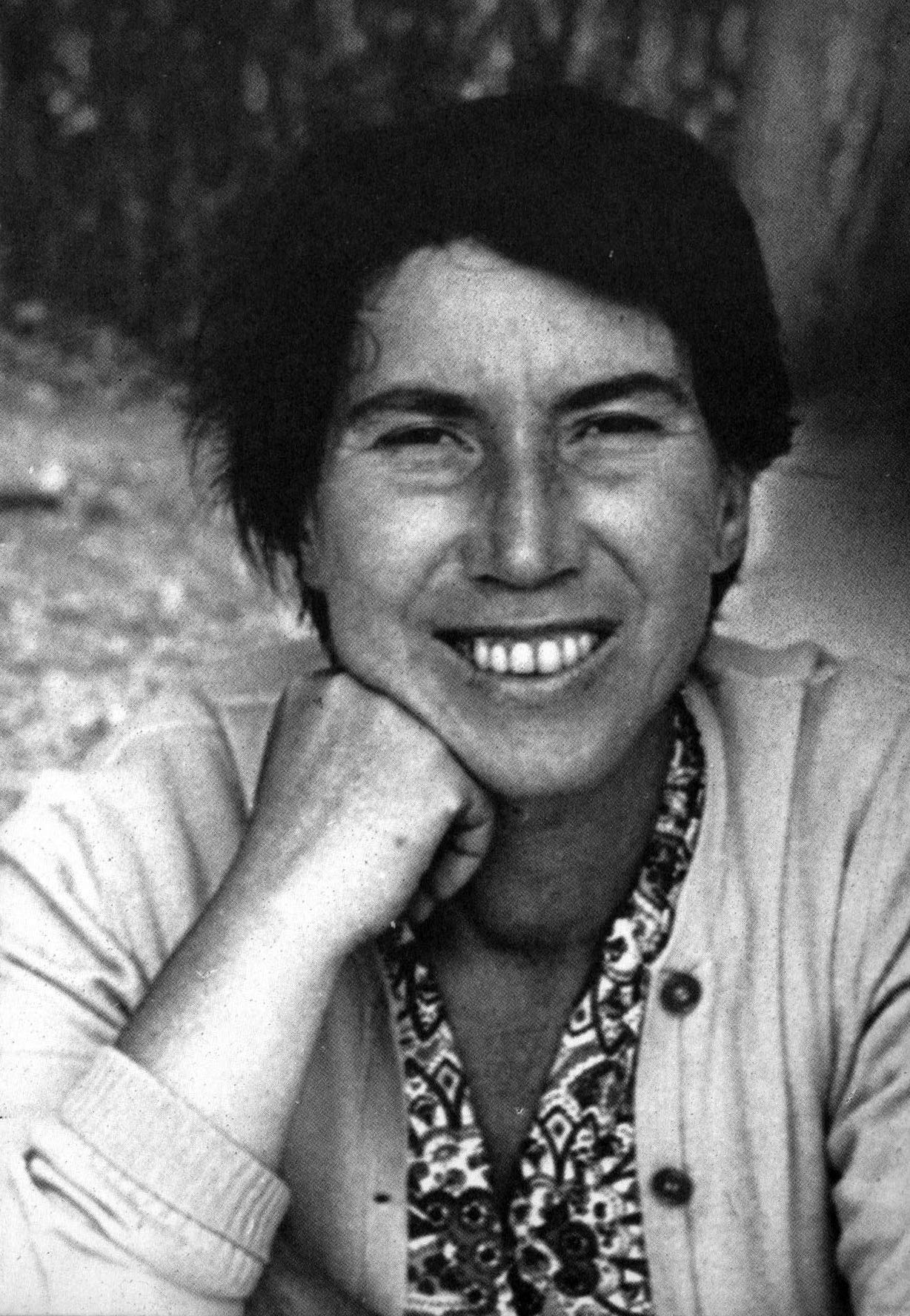
- Ginzburg in 1956
- Born: Natalia Levi; 14 July 1916; Palermo, Sicily, Kingdom of Italy
- Died: 7 October 1991 (aged 75); Rome, Lazio, Italy
- Resting place: Campo Verano, Rome
- Education: University of Turin
- Occupation: Writer
- Spouses: Leone Ginzburg (m. 1938; died 1944) Gabriele Baldini (m. 1950; died 1969)
- Children: 5, including Carlo Ginzburg
- Parent: Giuseppe Levi (father)
- Relatives: Margherita Sarfatti (second cousin); Silvio Tanzi (uncle); Drusilla Tanzi (aunt); Eugenio Tanzi (granduncle); Lisa Ginzburg (granddaughter)
- Writing career
- Pen name: Alessandra Tornimparte
- Language: Italian
- Genres: Novels; short stories; essays
- Notable works: The Road to the City; The Dry Heart; Voices in the Evening; Family Sayings; Caro Michele; The Advertisement
- Notable awards: 1963 Strega Prize Family Sayings; 1984 Bagutta Prize La famiglia Manzoni; (See more below)
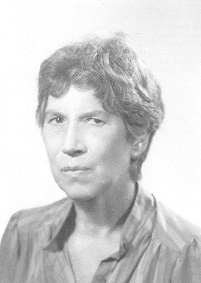
- Official portrait

Deputy of the Italian Republic
- In office 12 July 1983 – 7 October 1991
- Parliamentary group: Left-wing independents
- Constituency: Turin–Novara–Vercelli (1983–1987); Perugia–Terni–Rieti (1987–1991)

Personal details
- Party: Italian Communist Party (1930s); Independent (1983–1991)

Natalia Levi Ginzburg (Italian: [nataˈliːa ˈlɛːvi ˈɡintsburɡ, - ˈɡin(d)zburɡ]; later Levi Baldini; née Levi; 14 July 1916 – 7 October 1991) was an Italian author whose work explored family relationships, politics during and after the Fascist years and World War II, and philosophy. She wrote novels, short stories and essays, for which she received the Strega Prize and Bagutta Prize. Most of her works were also translated into English and published in the United Kingdom and the United States.

An activist, for a time in the 1930s she belonged to the Italian Communist Party. In 1983, she was elected to Parliament from Rome as an independent politician.

== Early life and education ==
Born as Natalia Levi in Palermo, Sicily, in 1916, she spent most of her youth in Turin with her family, as her father in 1919 took a position with the University of Turin. Her father, Giuseppe Levi, a renowned Italian histologist, was born into a Jewish Italian family, and her mother, Lidia Tanzi (the sister of Drusilla and Silvio Tanzi), was Catholic. Her parents were secular and raised Natalia, her sister Paola (who later married Adriano Olivetti) and her three brothers as atheists. Their home was a centre of cultural life, as her parents invited intellectuals, activists and industrialists. At the age of 17 in 1933, Levi published her first story, "I bambini", in the magazine Solaria.

== Marriage and family ==
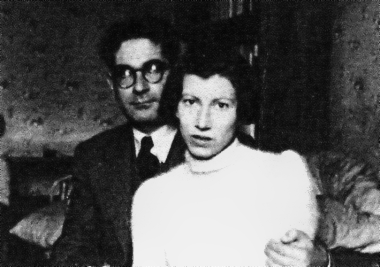
Natalia and Leone Ginzburg

In 1938, she married Leone Ginzburg, and they had three children together, Carlo (who became a historian), Andrea and Alessandra.

Although Natalia Ginzburg was able to live relatively free of harassment during World War II, her husband Leone was sent into internal exile because of his anti-Fascist activities, assigned from 1941 to 1943 to Pizzoli, a village in Abruzzo. She and their children lived most of the time with him. The couple's opposition to the Fascist regime pushed them to secretly travel to Rome and edit an anti-Fascist newspaper, until Leone Ginzburg was arrested. He died in incarceration in 1944 after suffering severe torture.

In 1950, Ginzburg married again, to Gabriele Baldini, a scholar of English literature. They lived in Rome and had two children, Susanna and Antonio. He died in 1969.

=== Children ===
- Carlo Ginzburg (1939–2026)
- Andrea Ginzburg (1940–2018)
- Alessandra Ginzburg (1943–2026)
- Susanna Baldini (1954–2002)
- Antonio Baldini (1959–1960)

== Career ==
After her marriage, she used the name "Natalia Ginzburg" (occasionally spelt "Ginzberg") in most subsequent publications. Her first novel was published under the pseudonym "Alessandra Tornimparte" in 1942, during Fascist Italy's most antisemitic period, when Jews were banned from publishing.

Ginzburg spent much of the 1940s working for the publisher Einaudi in Turin in addition to her creative writing. Ginzburg's second novel was published in 1947.

Beginning in 1950, when Ginzburg married Gabriele Baldini and moved to Rome, she entered the most prolific period of her literary career. During the next 20 years, she published most of the works for which she is best known. She and Baldini were deeply involved in the cultural life of the city.

In 1964, she played the role of Mary of Bethany in Pier Paolo Pasolini's film The Gospel According to St. Matthew.

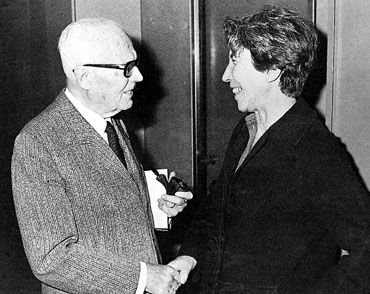
Ginzburg and President Sandro Pertini, early 1980s

Ginzburg was politically involved throughout her life as an activist and polemicist. Like many prominent anti-Fascists, for a time she belonged to the Italian Communist Party. She was elected to the Italian Parliament as an independent in 1983.

== Views ==
The experiences that Ginzburg and her husband had during the war altered her perception of her identification as a Jew, initially making her a Zionist in solidarity with the oppression faced by Jews; this ideology was dropped by the time of the 1972 Munich massacre, after which she stated that the Jews of Israel felt a certain sense of superiority over the Arabs, and that whenever people spoke highly of Israel, she found herself "on the other side", as she realized that "Arabs were poor farmers and shepherds." She thought deeply about the questions aroused by World War II and the Holocaust, dealing with them in fiction and essays. She became supportive of Catholicism, arousing controversy among her circle, because she believed that Christ was a persecuted Jew. She opposed the removal of crucifixes in public buildings but her purported conversion to Catholicism is controversial and some still consider her an "atheist Jew".

== Legacy ==
In 2020, the New York Review of Books issued Ginzburg's novellas Valentino and Sagittarius translated into English by Avril Bardoni in 1987, in a single volume. In her new introduction for this edition, Cynthia Zarin observed that location "maps the emotional terrain" in these two works as in Ginzburg's other works. At a book talk to honour its debut, Zarin and Jhumpa Lahiri discussed the significance of Ginzburg's works and career.

== Honours ==
- 1952, Veillon International Prize for Tutti i nostri ieri
- 1963, Strega Prize for Lessico famigliare
- 1984, Bagutta Prize for La famiglia Manzoni
- 1991, Foreign Honorary Member of the American Academy of Arts and Sciences

== Selected works ==
=== Novels and short stories ===
- La strada che va in città (1942). The Road to the City, transl. Frances Frenaye (1949) – first published under the name Alessandra Tornimparte
- È stato così (1947). The Dry Heart, transl. Frances Frenaye (1949)
- Tutti i nostri ieri (1952). A Light for Fools / All Our Yesterdays, transl. Angus Davidson (1985)
- Valentino (1957). Valentino, transl. Avril Bardoni (1987)
- Sagittario (1957). Sagittarius, transl. Avril Bardoni (1987)
- Le voci della sera (1961). Voices in the Evening, transl. D.M. Low (1963)
- Lessico famigliare (1963). Family Sayings, transl. D.M. Low (1963); The Things We Used to Say, transl. Judith Woolf (1997); Family Lexicon, transl. Jenny McPhee (2017)
- Caro Michele (1973). No Way, transl. Sheila Cudahy (1974); Dear Michael, transl. Sheila Cudahy (1975); Happiness, As Such, transl. Minna Zallman Proctor (2019) – adapted for the film Caro Michele (1976)
- Famiglia (1977). Family, transl. Beryl Stockman (1988)
- La famiglia Manzoni (1983). The Manzoni Family, transl. Marie Evans (1987)
- La città e la casa (1984). The City and the House, transl. Dick Davis (1986)

=== Essays ===
- Le piccole virtù (1962). The Little Virtues, transl. Dick Davis (1985)
- Mai devi domandarmi (1970). Never Must You Ask Me, transl. Isabel Quigly (1970) – mostly articles published in La Stampa between 1968-1979
- Vita immaginaria (1974). A Place to Live: And Other Selected Essays, transl. Lynne Sharon Schwartz (2002)
- Serena Cruz o la vera giustizia (1990). Serena Cruz, or The Meaning of True Justice, transl. Lynne Sharon Schwartz (2002)
- È difficile parlare di sé (1999). It's Hard to Talk About Yourself, transl. Louise Quirke (2003)

=== Dramatic works ===
- Ti ho sposato per allegria (1966). I Married You for Fun, transl. Henry Reed (1969); I Married You to Cheer Myself Up, transl. Wendell Ricketts (2008)
- Fragola e panna (1966). The Strawberry Ice, transl. Henry Reed (1973); Strawberry and Cream, transl. Wendell Ricketts (2008)
- La segretaria (1967). The Secretary, transl. Wendell Ricketts (2008)
- L'inserzione (1968). The Advertisement, transl. Henry Reed (1968) – performed at the Old Vic, London, directed by Sir Laurence Olivier and starring Joan Plowright, in 1968.
- La porta sbagliata (1968). The Wrong Door, transl. Wendell Ricketts (2008)
- Paese di mare (1968). A Town by the Sea, transl. Wendell Ricketts (2008)
- Dialogo (1970). Duologue, transl. Henry Reed (1977); Dialogue, transl. Wendell Ricketts (2008)
- La parrucca (1973). The Wig, transl. Henry Reed (1976); Jen Wienstein (2000); Wendell Ricketts (2008)
- La poltrona (1985). The Armchair, transl. Wendell Ricketts (2008)
- L'intervista (1988). The Interview, transl. Wendell Ricketts (2008)
- Il cormorano (1991). The Cormorant, transl. Wendell Ricketts (2008)
