= Family Lexicon =

1963 novel by Natalia Ginzburg

- Author: Natalia Ginzburg
- Original title: Lessico famigliare
- Language: Italian
- Genre: Autobiographical novel
- Publisher: Einaudi
- Publication date: 1963
- Publication place: Italy
- Pages: 218 (Italian, 1st ed.)

Family Lexicon (Italian: Lessico famigliare) is a novel by the Italian author Natalia Ginzburg, first published in 1963. The book, which has also been published in English under the titles Family Sayings and The Things We Used to Say, is a semi-biographical description of aspects of the daily life of her family, dominated by her father, the renowned histologist Giuseppe Levi. It won the Strega Prize in 1963.

== Plot ==
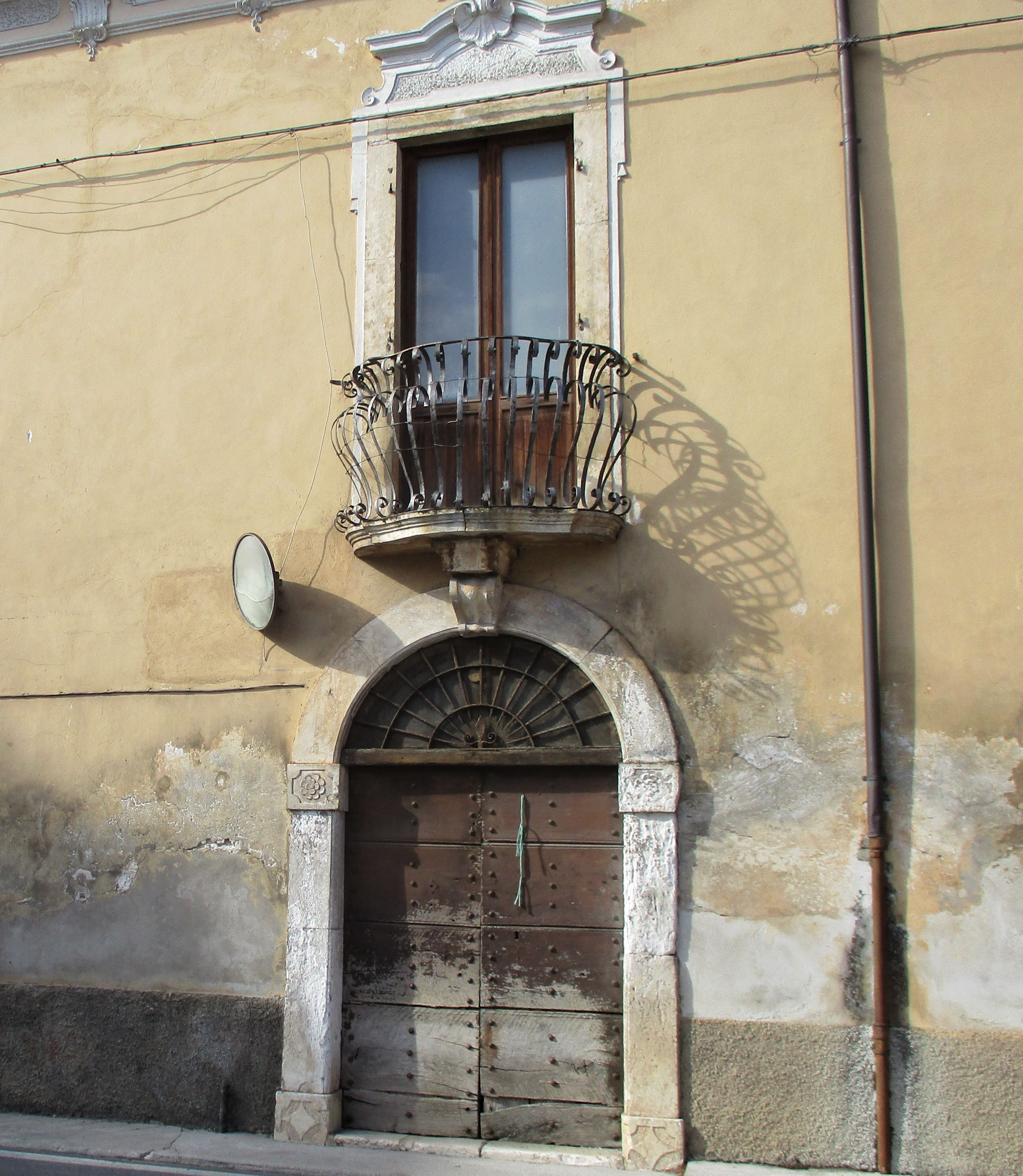
The Ginzburg's family home in Pizzoli

The book is both an ironic and affectionate chronicle of life in the period 1920–1950, portrayed in terms of habits, behavior and, above all, linguistic communications, from which the book takes its title. People and events are brought to life by what they do and what they say. In addition to family members, including her mother, father, brothers and sisters, the book also describes many friends and acquaintances.

The novel covers the period of fascism in Italy and the early post-war years. It describes the death in custody of her husband Leone Ginzburg, a noted anti-fascist, and the persecution of Jews in Italy during the rule of Benito Mussolini. It ends with the suicide of the writer Cesare Pavese in 1950 and disillusionment at the failure to achieve the aims of the war-time resistance movement.

== Publication history ==
Lessico famigliare was first published in Italy in 1963 by Giulio Einaudi Editore. It was then translated into English in 1967 by D. M. Low under the title Family Sayings, followed by an edited and revised translation in 1985. The first edition was published by E. P. Dutton in the United States and Hogarth Press in the United Kingdom. It was retranslated by Judith Woolf for Arcade Publishing in 1999 under the title The Things We Used To Say, and by Jenny McPhee in 2017 for the NYRB Classics series as Family Lexicon.

== Reception ==
Family Lexicon won the Strega Prize, the most prestigious in Italian literature, in 1963.
