= Carlo Ginzburg =

Italian historian (1939–2026)

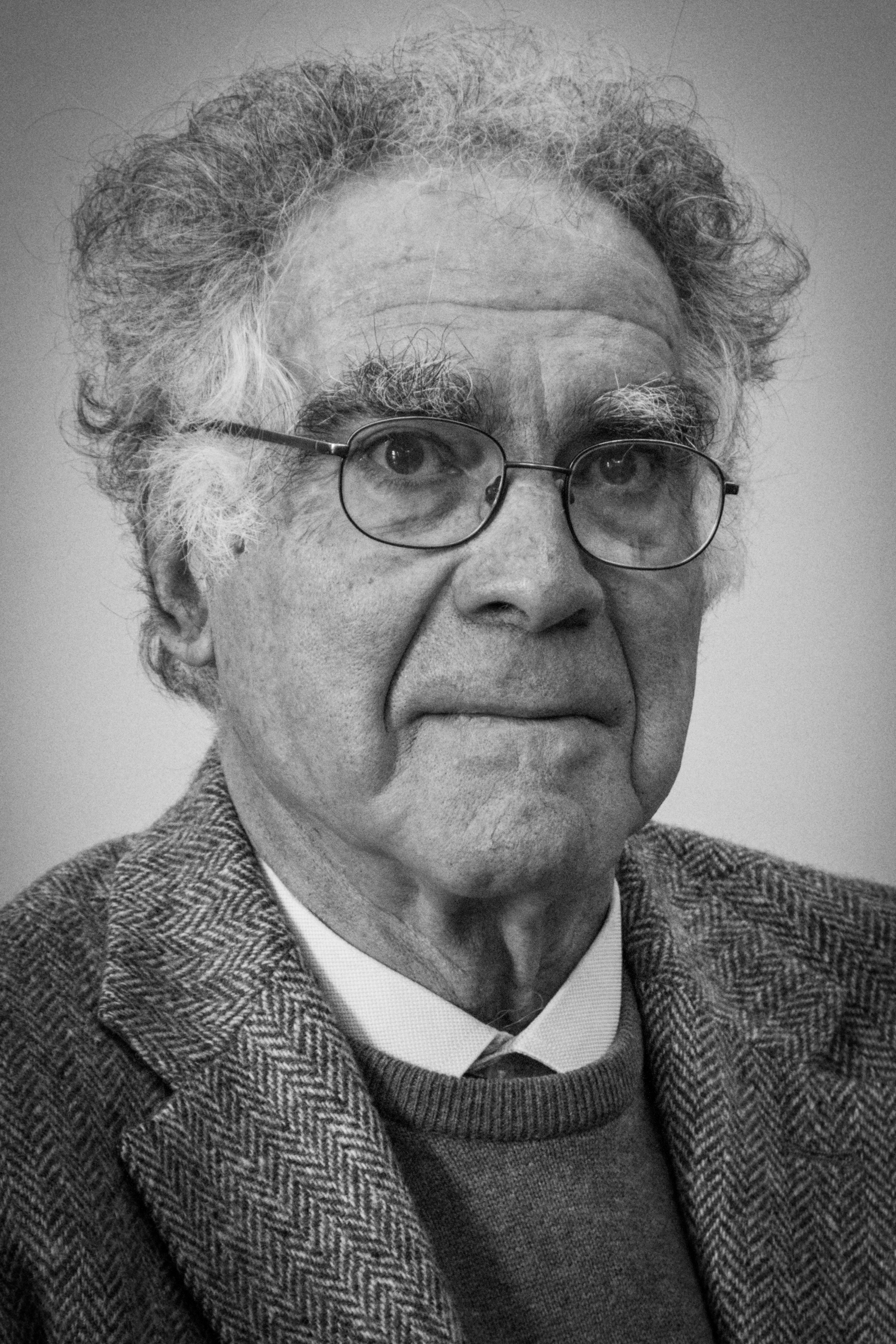
- Ginzburg in 2013
- Born: 15 April 1939; Turin, Piedmont, Kingdom of Italy
- Died: 17 June 2026 (aged 87); Bologna, Emilia-Romagna, Italy
- Education: University of Pisa (PhD)
- Occupations: Historian; microhistorian
- Years active: 1966–2026
- Spouses: Anna Rossi-Doria (divorced); Luisa Ciammitti
- Children: 2, including Lisa
- Parents: Leone Ginzburg (father); Natalia Levi (mother)
- Relatives: Giuseppe Levi (grandfather); Margherita Sarfatti (second cousin once removed); Silvio Tanzi (granduncle); Drusilla Tanzi (grandaunt); Eugenio Tanzi (great-granduncle)
- Awards: Balzan Prize (2010)

Signature
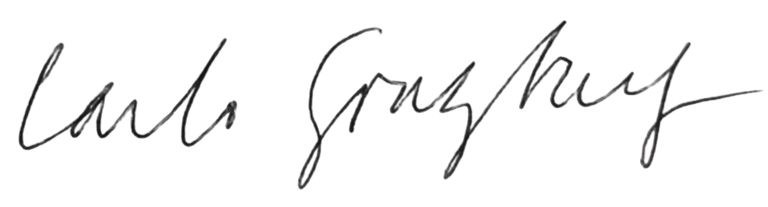

Carlo Ginzburg (Italian: [ˈkarlo ˈɡintsburɡ, - ˈɡin(d)zburɡ]; 15 April 1939 – 17 June 2026) was an Italian historian and one of the founders of the field of microhistory. Coming from a Jewish family from Turin, he received a PhD from the University of Pisa in 1961. He subsequently pursued an academic career. His works include The Night Battles, The Cheese and the Worms, and Ecstasies: Deciphering the Witches' Sabbath.

== Early life and education ==
Ginzburg was born in Turin on 15 April 1939, to a family of Lithuanian/Russian-Jewish and Italian-Jewish origins, he was the eldest of three children. His father, Leone, was a philologist, historian, and literary critic and co-founder of the publishing firm Einaudi. The family had emigrated to Italy from Odesa in present-day Ukraine. Leone Ginzburg was tortured and murdered by the Gestapo in 1944 for publishing an antifascist newspaper. Carlo Ginzburg's mother, Natalia (Levi), was a novelist and essayist. His interest in history was influenced by the works of historians Delio Cantimori and Marc Bloch. He received a PhD from the University of Pisa in 1961. He also studied at the Warburg Institute in London.

== Career ==
Ginzburg subsequently held teaching positions at the University of Bologna, the University of California, Los Angeles (1988–2006), and the Scuola Normale Superiore di Pisa. In 1975–76, he taught at the Institute for Advanced Study of Princeton University on a Fulbright grant. His fields of interest ranged from the Italian Renaissance to early modern European history, with contributions to art history, literary studies, and the theory of historiography.

He is considered to be among the founders of the subdiscipline of microhistory. In an obituary, Maria Galeotti credited him with helping establish "an entire field of study dedicated to society's marginalized and forgotten figures." In 1966, he published The Night Battles, an examination of the benandanti visionary folk tradition found in 16th- and 17th-century Friuli. In 1976 he published The Cheese and the Worms, which examined the beliefs of Italian heretic Menocchio from Friuli. He returned to looking at the visionary traditions of early modern Europe for his 1989 book Ecstasies: Deciphering the Witches' Sabbath.

In 1979, Ginzburg formally requested that Pope John Paul II open the Inquisition Archives. While the immediate response of the Vatican had not yet come to light, a limited group of scholars were granted access by 1991. In January 1998, the archives were formally opened to "qualified researchers". Cardinal Ratzinger (who later became Pope Benedict XVI) credited Ginzburg and his 1979 letter as having been instrumental in the Vatican's decision to open these archives. Ginzburg had his doubts about using statistics to reach a judgment about the period. "In many cases, we don't have the evidence, the evidence has been lost", said Ginzburg.

Along with Paul Ginsborg, Marcello Flores, Sergio Luzzatto, Claudio Pavone, Enzo Traverso, etc., Ginzburg called, in January 2007, for the rejection of a bill, presented by Justice Minister Clemente Mastella, that would have outlawed Holocaust denial. They argued that Italy's legislation was sufficient to cope with such acts. The amended bill finally restricted itself to reinforcing sentences concerning hate speech.

Ginzburg was awarded the 2010 Balzan Prize and was elected an International Member of the American Philosophical Society in 2013.

== Work ==
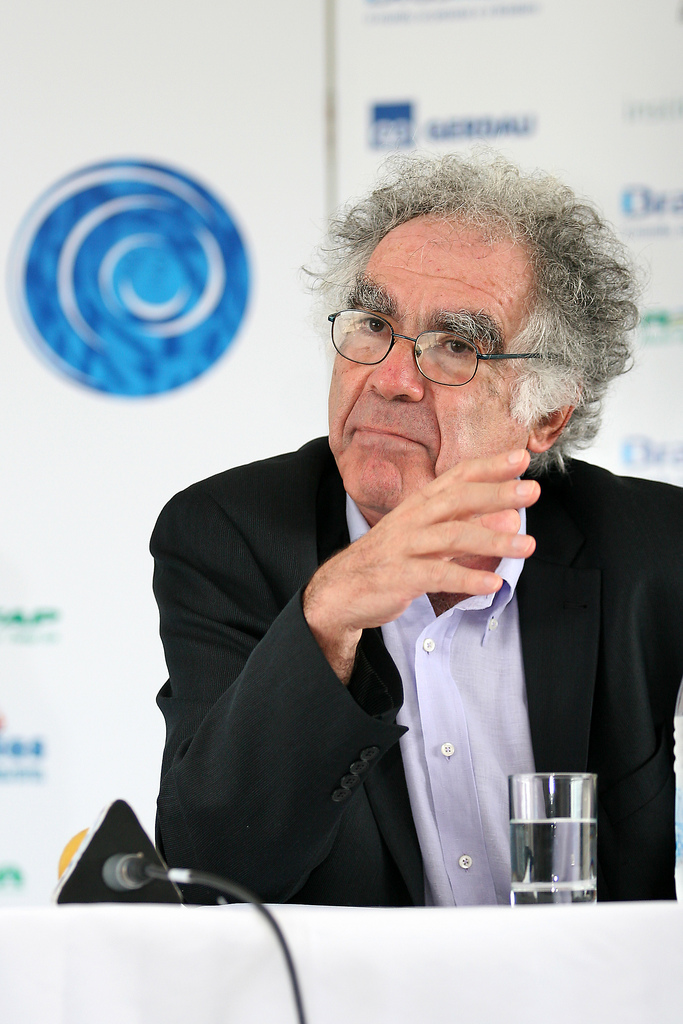
Ginzburg in 2010

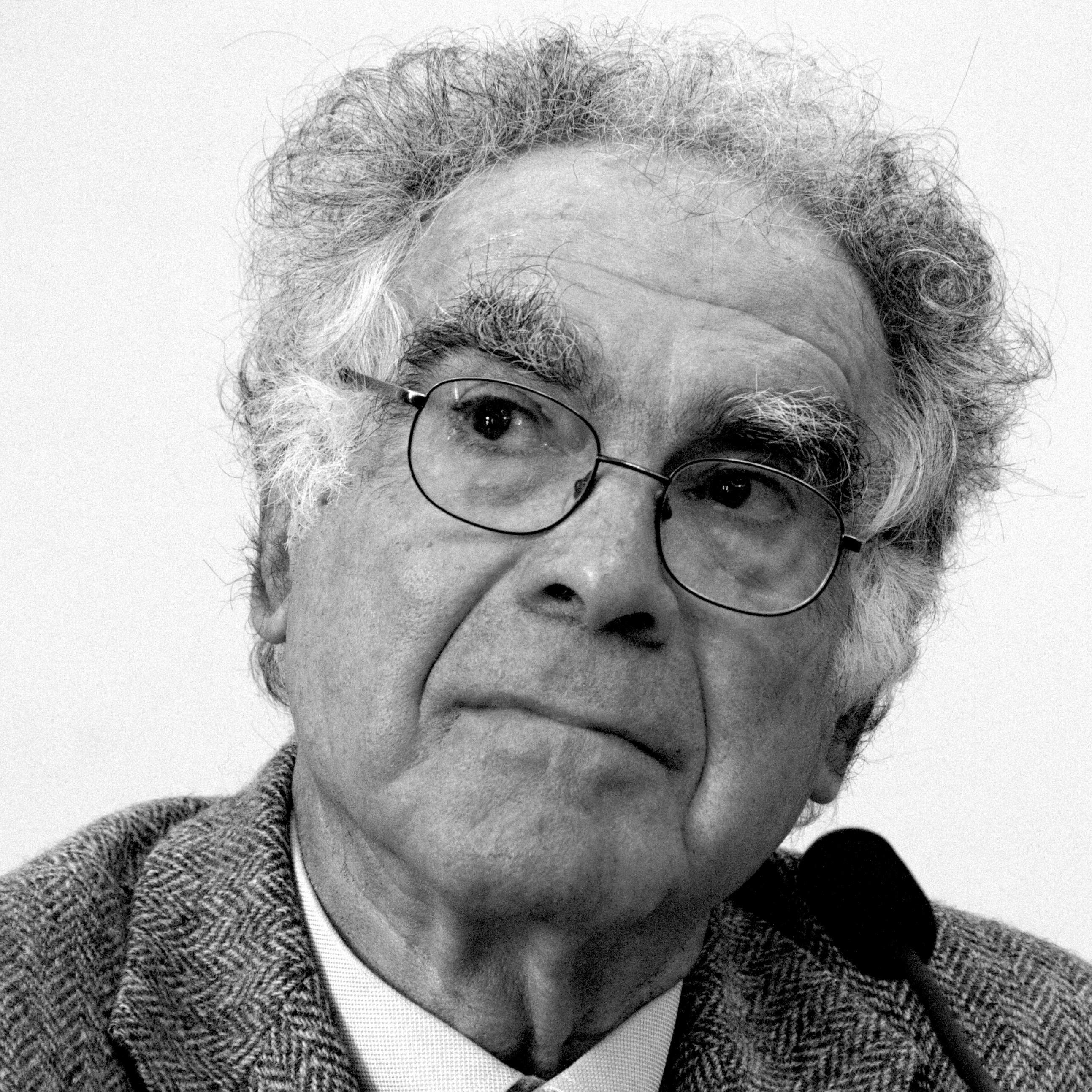
Ginzburg in 2013

In The Night Battles and Ecstasies, Ginzburg traced a complex path from certain European witch persecutions to the benandanti and a wide variety of practices which he describes as evidence of a substrate of shamanic cults in Europe. His 1999 work, The Judge and the Historian, sought to expose injustice in the trial of Adriano Sofri, but failed to win a new trial. His book was not only about Sofri but was also a general reflection on the scientific methods used by a historian, and their similarity to the work of a judge, who also has to correlate testimonies with material evidence in order to deduce what really happened. Thus, he explains how the judicial model of early historiography made it focus on easily verifiable facts, resulting in studies that centred on individuals or on what Lucien Febvre and Marc Bloch called in the Annales d'histoire économique et sociale an "evenemential history". In his book History, Rhetoric, and Proof (1999), he contrasts the ancient rhetoric of Aristotle with the modern rhetoric of Nietzsche. One of his last essays, The Bond of Shame, argued that shame can reveal a deeper sense of belonging than love. Ginzburg wrote, "the country one belongs to is not ... the one you love but the one you are ashamed of". He argued that when a country's crimes or failures make us feel shame, it is because we identify with it and regard ourselves as part of its story. The wrongdoing feels partly "ours" even if we did not personally commit it. Without that connection, we would simply condemn it as outsiders.

== Personal life and death ==
Ginzburg's first marriage, which ended in divorce, was to fellow historian Anna Rossi-Doria; they had two children, one of whom is writer Lisa Ginzburg. He later married Luisa Ciammitti.

Ginzburg died in the early hours of 17 June 2026, at the age of 87, in Bologna, where he had spent his last years.

== Bibliography ==
- The Cheese and the Worms: The Cosmos of a Sixteenth Century Miller. Baltimore: Johns Hopkins University Press (published 1980). March 1992. ISBN 0-8018-4387-1. (First published in Italian as Il formaggio e i vermi, 1976)
- The Night Battles: Witchcraft and Agrarian Cults in the Sixteenth and Seventeenth Centuries. Baltimore: Johns Hopkins University Press. 1983. ISBN 0-8018-4386-3. (First published in Italian as I benandanti, 1966)
- Umberto Eco; Thomas Sebeok, eds. (1984). "Morelli, Freud, and Sherlock Holmes: Clues and Scientific Method". The Sign of Three: Dupin, Holmes, Peirce. Bloomington, IN: Indiana University Press. pp. 81–118. ISBN 978-0-253-35235-4.
- Ginzburg, Carlo (1985). The Enigma of Piero. London. ISBN 0-86091-904-8. (revised edition, 2000)
- Clues, Myths and the Historical Method. Baltimore: Johns Hopkins University Press. 1989. ISBN 0-8018-4388-X.
- Ginzburg, Carlo (1991). Ecstasies: Deciphering the Witches' Sabbath. New York. ISBN 0-226-29693-8. (First published in Italian as Storia notturna: Una decifrazione del Sabba, 1989)
- Ginzburg, Carlo; Ryle, Martin (1998). Wooden Eyes. Milan. ISBN 0-231-11960-7.
- Ginzburg, Carlo (1999). The Judge and the Historian: Marginal Notes and a Late-Twentieth-century Miscarriage of Justice. London. ISBN 1-85984-371-9. (First published in Italian as Il giudice e la storico, 1991)
- Ginzburg, Carlo (1999). History, Rhetoric, and Proof: The Menachem Stern Jerusalem Lectures. London and Hanover. ISBN 0-87451-933-0.
- Ginzburg, Carlo (1999). Das Schwert und die Glühbirne: Eine neue Lektüre von Picassos Guernica. Frankfurt am Main. ISBN 3-518-12103-0.
- Ginzburg, Carlo (2000). No Island is an Island: Four Glances at English Literature in a World Perspective. New York. ISBN 0-231-11628-4.
- Un dialogo. Milano. 2003. ISBN 8807170892.
- Threads and Traces: True, False, Fictive. University of California Press. 2012. ISBN 9780520274488.
- Ginzburg, Carlo. "Latitude, Slaves and the Bible: An Experiment in Microhistory" (PDF). Archived from the original (PDF) on 22 December 2014.
