= Giuseppe Levi =

Italian anatomist and histologist (1872–1965)

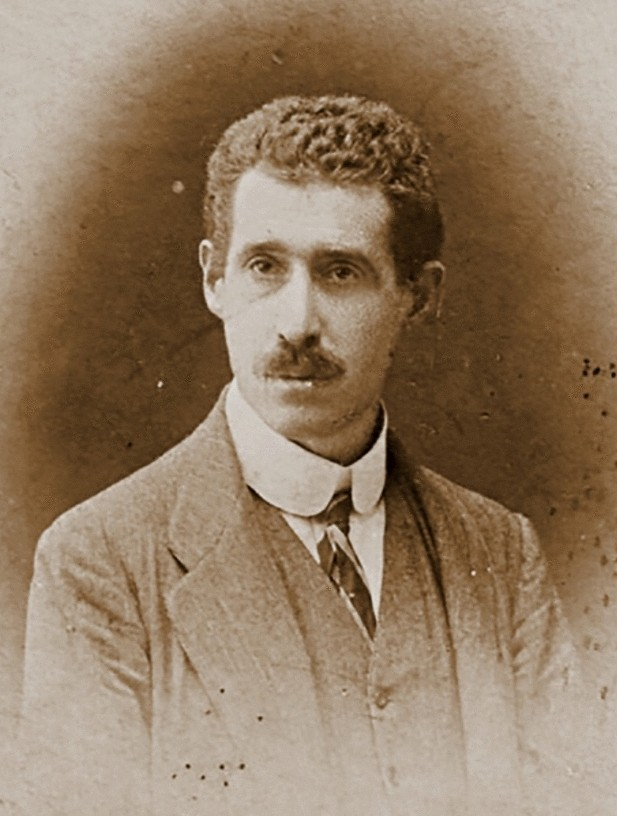
- Levi c. 1900s
- Born: 14 October 1872; Imperial Free City of Trieste, Austrian Littoral, Austria-Hungary
- Died: 3 February 1965 (aged 92); Turin, Piedmont, Italy
- Occupation: Professor of human anatomy
- Known for: Pioneer of in vitro studies on cultured cells
- Spouse: Lidia Tanzi (m. 1901; died 1957)
- Children: 5, including Natalia
- Relatives: Margherita Sarfatti (first cousin once removed); Carlo Ginzburg (grandson); Lisa Ginzburg (great-granddaughter)

Academic work
- Discipline: Anatomy; histology
- Institutions: University of Turin; University of Sassari; University of Palermo; Accademia Nazionale dei Lincei
- Notable students: Salvador Luria; Renato Dulbecco; Rita Levi-Montalcini

Giuseppe Levi (14 October 1872 – 3 February 1965) was an Italian anatomist and histologist, professor of human anatomy (since 1916) at the universities of Sassari, Palermo and Turin. He was a pioneer of in vitro studies of cultured cells, and contributed to the study of the nervous system, especially on the plasticity of sensory ganglion cells. While in Turin, Levi tutored three students who later won the Nobel Prize: Salvador Luria, Renato Dulbecco and Rita Levi-Montalcini.

He was admitted as a national member of the Accademia Nazionale dei Lincei in 1926. In 1931 he subscribed to the oath of allegiance to the Fascist regime imposed to university professors.

== Personal life ==
Born in Trieste to Jewish parents Michele Levi and Emma Perugia, he was married to Lidia Tanzi and had five children: Gino, Mario, Alberto, Paola (who became the wife of Adriano Olivetti), and writer Natalia Ginzburg (wife of Leone Ginzburg and mother of Carlo Ginzburg), who described her father's personality in the successful Italian book Lessico famigliare (1963).

== Bibliography ==
- Andrea Grignolio (ed.), Giuseppe Levi, «Medicina nei secoli» (Special issue: articles in Italian or in English), 2018, Vol. 30, n. 1, pp. 9-445

== External sources ==
- English translation via Google Translate
