= Franco Ferrarotti =

Italian politician (1926–2024)

Franco Ferrarotti OMRI
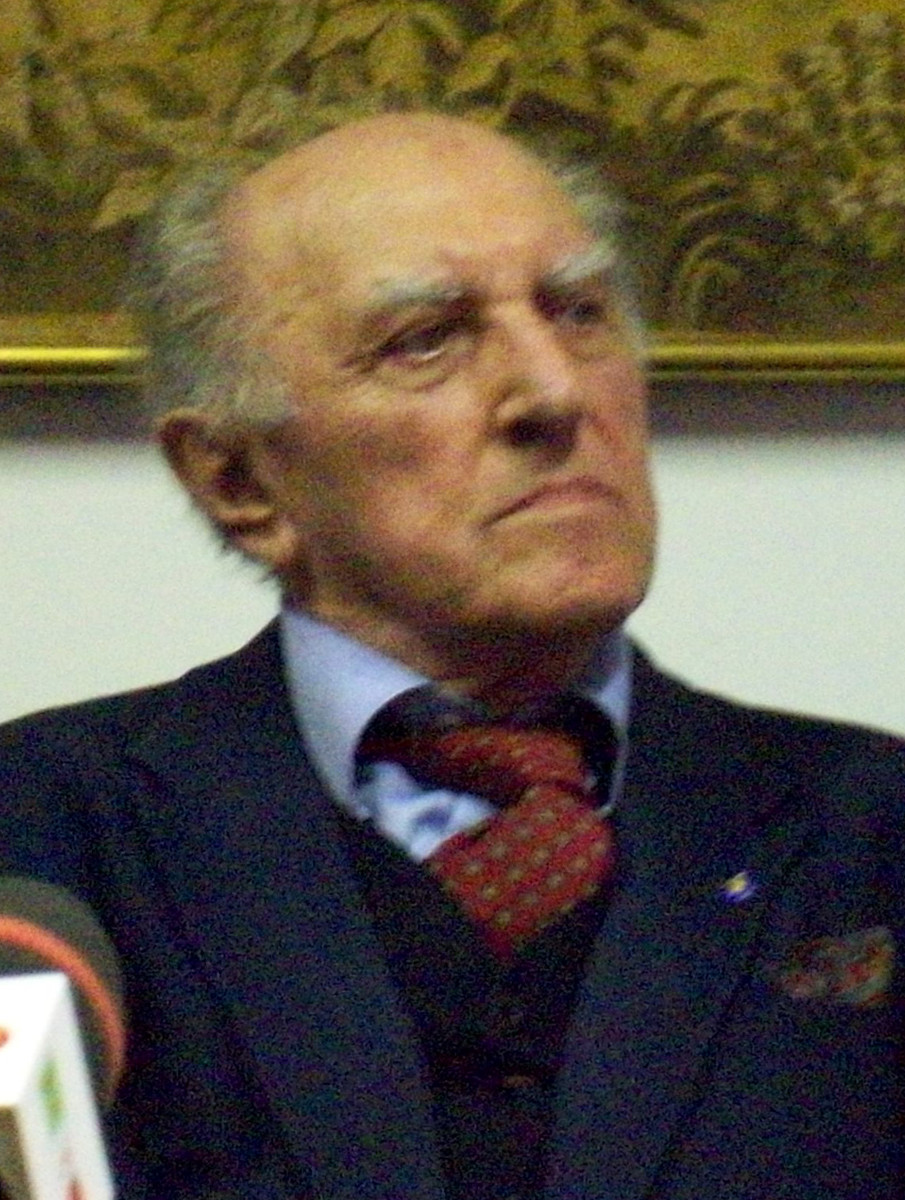
- Ferrarotti in 2014

Member of the Chamber of Deputies
- In office 12 November 1959 – 15 May 1963
- Constituency: Turin

Personal details
- Born: 7 April 1926 Palazzolo Vercellese, Italy
- Died: 13 November 2024 (aged 98) Rome, Italy
- Party: MC (1958–1961); PSDI (1961–1963)
- Education: University of Turin
- Profession: Sociologist, academic

Franco Ferrarotti, OMRI (7 April 1926 – 13 November 2024) was an Italian sociologist and a member of the Chamber of Deputies, elected with Adriano Olivetti's Community Movement.

== Life and career ==
Born in Palazzolo Vercellese, Piedmont, on 7 April 1926, Ferrarotti studied at the Universities of Turin, London and Chicago. In 1951, together with Nicola Abbagnano, he founded the Quaderni di Sociologia, which he edited until 1967 when he started La Critica Sociologica. In 1960 he was awarded the first full-time chair of sociology established in the Italian academic system.

A prolific writer and a worldwide traveller, he has taught in many universities all over the world, from Columbia University, The New School and the Graduate Center of the City University of New York to the Hebrew University of Jerusalem, Tokyo University, Université Laval in Québec, Universidad Autonoma de Barcelona and Université la Sorbonne in Paris. Between 1945 and 1963 he was active in four fields: a) as an editorial consultant and translator for Giulio Einaudi in Turin; b) as a collaborator of Adriano Olivetti, concerning mostly industrial relations; c) as director of the “Social Factors”, of the OECE in Paris; d) as an independent member of Parliament (1959-1963). In 1963 he did not stand for reelection because the electoral law made it impossible to run as an independent, and more importantly, because he had decided to devote himself completely to teaching and research. In this perspective, he is widely regarded as the founder of postwar Italian sociology.

Ferrarotti was awarded the Knight Grand Cross from the Order of Merit of the Italian Republic in 2005. A 2012 journal article referred to Ferrarotti as "the father of Italian sociology."

Ferrarotti died in Rome on 13 November 2024, at the age of 98.
