= David Lowe =

David Lowe may refer to:

== Academics ==
- Dave Lowe (atmospheric scientist) (born 1946), New Zealand atmospheric scientist
- David Fowler Lowe (1843–1924), headmaster of George Heriot's School
- David G. Lowe, Canadian professor of computer science
- David Lowe (historian) (born 1964), Australian historian and biographer
- Sir David Lowe (horticulturalist) (1899–1980), Scottish horticulturalist and businessman

== Arts ==
- David Lowe (actor) (born 1955), English film director, actor, composer and scientist
- David Lowe (producer) (1913–1965), American television producer
- David Lowe (television and radio composer) (born 1959), English composer focusing primarily on music for television
- David Lowe (video game composer), English composer known for his work on 8-bit and 16-bit computer games

== Sports ==
- David Lowe (cricketer) (born 1979), former English cricketer
- David Lowe (footballer) (born 1965), English professional football player
- David Lowe (sport shooter), British sports shooter
- David Lowe (swimmer) (born 1960), English butterfly and freestyle swimmer

== Politics ==
- David P. Lowe (1823–1882), U.S. Representative from Kansas
- David Lowe (socialist) (1867–1947), Scottish socialist activist
- David Lowe (Texas politician)

== Others ==
- David Nicoll Lowe (1909–1999), secretary of the Carnegie Trust, 1954–1970
- David Lowe (winemaker) (born 1958), Australian winemaker

== See also ==
- David Low (disambiguation)
