= David Low =

David Low may refer to:

- David Low (bishop) (1768–1855), cleric of the Scottish Episcopal Church
- David Low (cartoonist) (1891–1963), New Zealand political cartoonist in the United Kingdom
- David Low (agriculturalist) (1786–1859), Scottish agriculturalist
- G. David Low (1956–2008), astronaut from the United States
- Dave Low (1887–1916), Australian rules footballer
- David Low (politician) (1911–1974), Australian politician from Queensland
- David Low (footballer) (born 1983), Singaporean footballer
- D. M. Low (David Morrice Low, 1890–1972), British academic

== See also ==
- David Lowe (disambiguation)
