= Drusilla Tanzi =

Italian writer

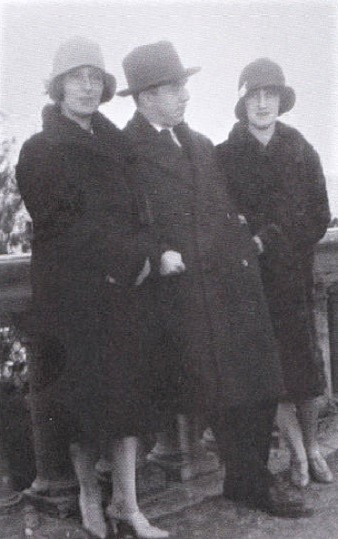
- Tanzi (left) with her future husband Eugenio Montale and Gerti Frankl, 1928
- Born: 5 April 1885; Milan, Kingdom of Italy
- Died: 20 October 1963 (aged 78); Milan, Italy
- Occupation: Writer
- Spouses: Matteo Marangoni (m. 1910; died 1958); Eugenio Montale (m. 1958)
- Children: Andrea
- Father: Carlo Tanzi
- Relatives: Silvio Tanzi (brother); Eugenio Tanzi (uncle); Natalia Ginzburg (niece); Carlo Ginzburg (great-nephew)

Drusilla Tanzi (5 April 1885 – 20 October 1963) was an Italian writer who was born and died in Milan.

== Life and career ==
Tanzi was the daughter of the socialist lawyer Carlo Tanzi. She was a niece of Eugenio Tanzi, sister of Lidia and Silvio Tanzi, and (via Lidia) aunt of Natalia Ginzburg.

She first became the wife of the art historian Matteo Marangoni and later the poet and Nobel Prize winner Eugenio Montale. She married for the second time in 1958 only after her first husband's death that same year, even though she had been living with Montale long before that time.

Tanzi was nicknamed "Mosca" (fly) because of her thick glasses to correct a strong myopia.

She has been called a "muse of Montale" who dedicated two sections of his 1971 poetry collection Satura to her. According to Ahern, writing about Montale:

In 1927 the 30-year-old poet fell in love with Drusilla Tanzi, the wife of an eminent Italian art critic. Myopic, not beautiful, overbearing, she remained the central woman of his life until her death.

The two met after Montale moved to Florence to pursue his poetry and he moved into the home she shared with her husband and the critic, Marangoni. Tanzi and the poet soon became lovers and moved in together on via Duca di Genova. Montale featured her in many of his works using her Mosca nickname, but he kept her true identity secret for many years.

== Selected works ==
- Tanzi, D. (2014). Caro piccolo insetto. Dear little bug, 80–84.
