= John Glasse =

Church of Scotland minister and Christian socialist activist

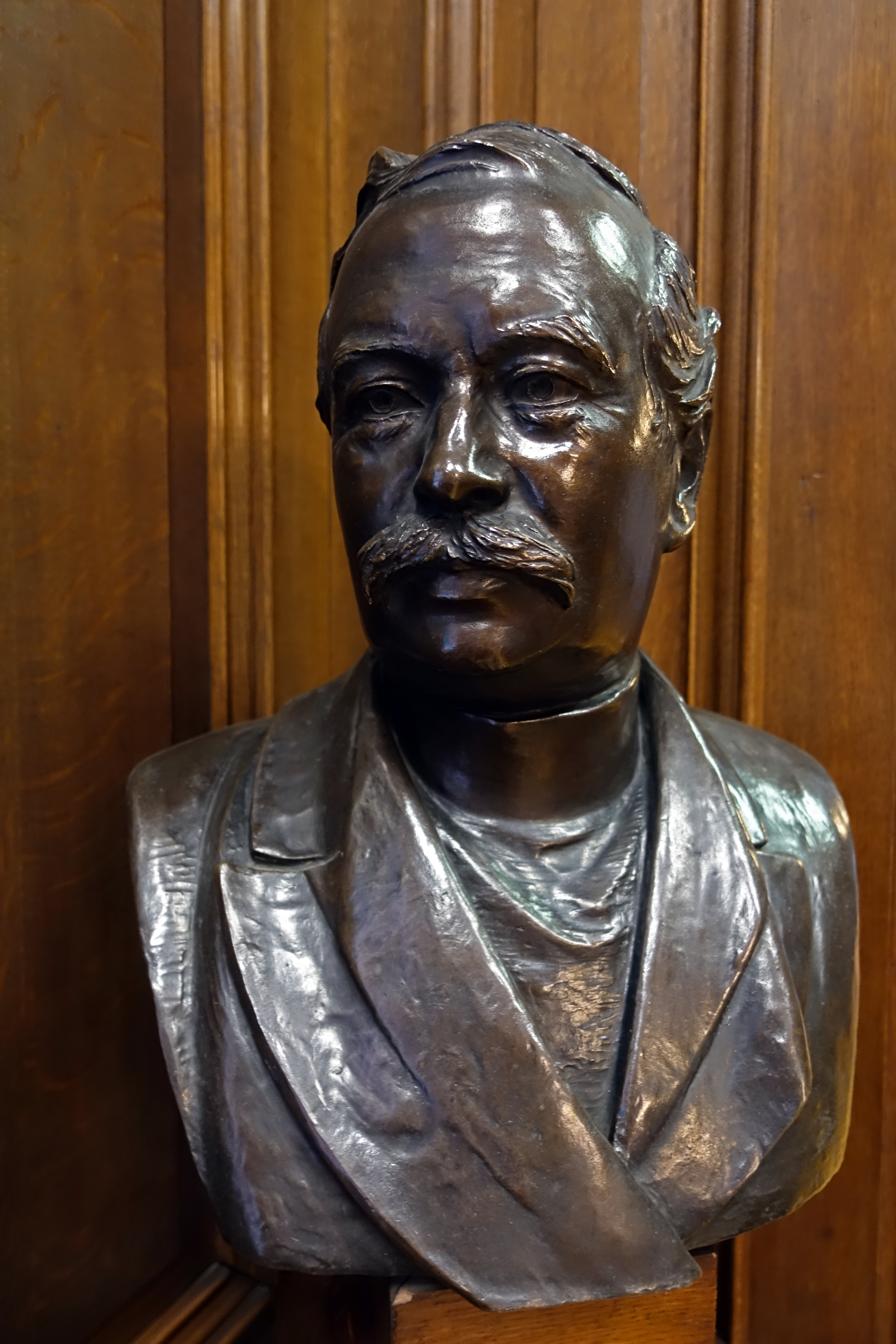
- Born: 27 January 1848; Auchtermuchty
- Died: 8 February 1918 (aged 70)
- Education: Master of Arts, Doctor of Divinity
- Alma mater: University of St Andrews; New College
- Occupation: Clergyman (1877–)
- Political party: Socialist League, Social Democratic Federation
- Position held: Minister (Greyfriars Kirk, 1877–1909)

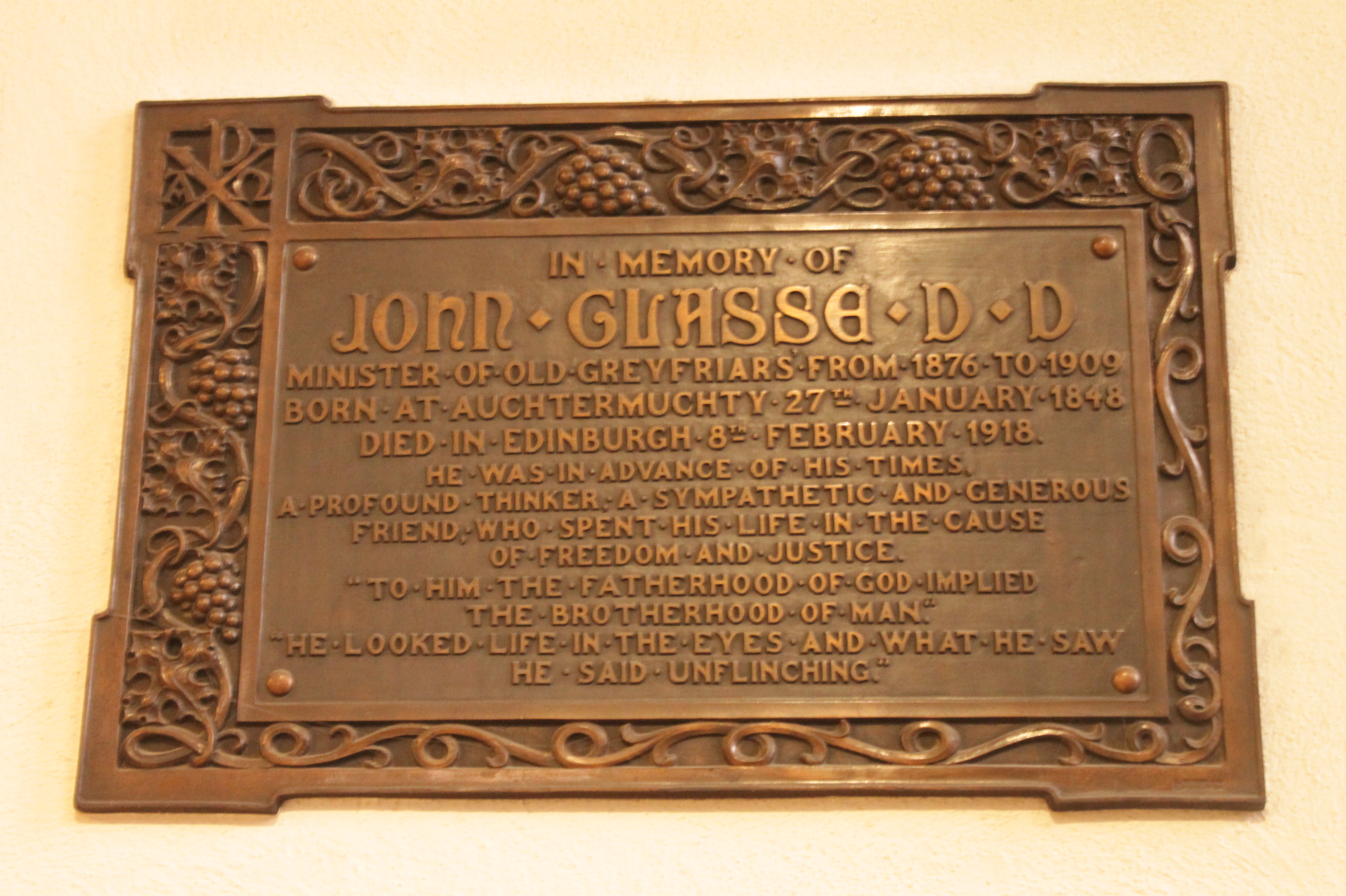
Memorial to Rev John Glasse, Greyfriars Kirk

John Glasse (1848–1918) was a Church of Scotland Minister at Greyfriars Kirk, Edinburgh, Scotland, 1877-1909. He was a leading advocate of Christian Socialism, and was described by Sidney Webb as one of the "two most influential Scottish socialists".

== Life ==
He was born in Auchtermuchty on 27 January 1848 the eldest son of John Glasse and educated there in the Free Church School. He studied at St Andrews University and at New College, Edinburgh. Although training as a minister of the Free Church he joined the established Church of Scotland and was licensed to preach by the Presbytery of Edinburgh in 1876 and ordained as minister of Old Greyfriars in Edinburgh on 27 March 1877 - a remarkable position as his first job as minister. He then lived at 21 Tantallon Place.

At Greyfriars he was at the centre of a socialist studies group held at his manse in Tantallon Place whose membership included Annie Besant, Peter Kropotkin, and William Morris. A personal friend of Morris, those whom he tutored also included James Connolly and James Thompson Bain.

He was a member of the Scottish Land and Labour League; and although the SLLL itself sought to maintain its distance from the Socialist League, at the urging of Morris, Glasse joined the Socialist League in 1887, his membership fee of £5 (equivalent to £702.3 in 2023) paid to Philip Webb as recorded by the latter in a letter to Morris.

In his 1919 history of the Scottish Labour Party David Lowe observed that Glasse "gathered around him many ardent idealists, to whom he administered doses of Proudon and Marx". Glasse was a pivotal figure in the emergence of Scottish socialism in Edinburgh, going on to found the Glasgow branch of the Independent Labour Party with John Bruce Glasier. He was unusual for the time for being one of the few Church of Scotland ministers who was politically committed to the Labour movement before World War One. His holding a respected position within the Church while espousing socialist beliefs and publishing the below-mentioned pamphlets indicated a significant shift towards political pluralism in the attitudes of the Church since the middle of the 19th century, when radicals such as Rayner Stephens and Patrick Brewster had incurred more negative consequences for their beliefs.

He founded the first Fabian Society in Scotland in 1892, in Edinburgh. He was patron of the Greyfriars Choral Society and an executive committee member of the Edinburgh Unity of The Empire Association.

He was awarded an honorary Doctor of Divinity (DD) by St Andrews University in 1895.

He resigned as minister of Greyfriars in October 1909. In 1911 he was living at 16 Tantallon Place.

He died in 1918.

== Family ==
He married twice, firstly in July 1878 to Jane Scott White (d.1904), daughter of Provost White of Auchtermuchty. Their children were: Dr John Morley Glasse MD (b. 1879) a GP in Haltwhistle, Helen Margaret Glasse (b. 1881) married E. B. Scott-Melville of Dundee. In 1907 he married Louisa Plymer Gibson daughter of Alexander Gibson of Ceylon.

== Works ==
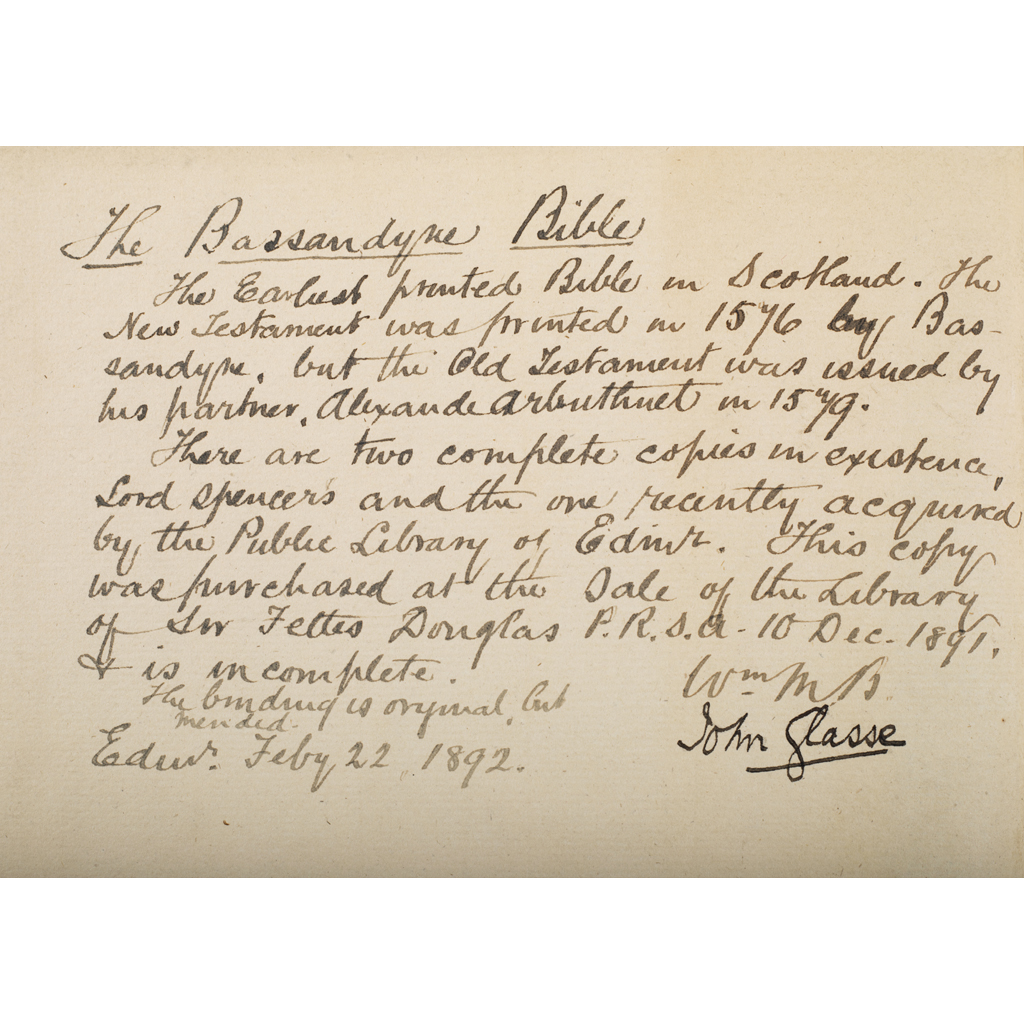
Glasse's inscription on the endpaper of a copy of Thomas Bassendyne's Bible, with his signature, sold by his family in 2017

His The Relationship of the Church to Socialism (published in 1900) was one of several pamphlets that he wrote for the socialist movement. In it, amongst other things, he expressed doubt as to the motivations for the then movement for Ritualism in the Church of England, opining that it was less motivated by popular demand and more motivated by sacerdotalism and self-aggrandizement. He also expressed his objection to doctrines of Socialism being inevitable, which he regarded as damaging to the Socialist movement. He wrote that "The object of my paper was to persuade the ministers and members of the Church of Scotland that they were not worthy of their privileges or position unless they resolved in the spirit of the prophets and of Jesus, and work along with Socialists in breaking every yoke and letting the oppressed go free."

In addition to the aforementioned pamphlet, Glasse wrote about John Knox.

- Glasse, John (1905). John Knox, a Criticism. London.
- Glasse, John (1906). "John Knox and Scottish Reformation". Quarterly Review. 205.

Earlier writings by him include Robert Owen and his Life-work and Pauperism in Scotland, Past and Present.

In response to an appeal by Edward Carpenter for songs for a forthcoming socialist songbook, Glasse wrote "A Processional Hymn", to be sung to the tune St Gertrude by Arthur Sullivan, which was printed in the 22 October 1882 edition of The Commonweal.

His Times and Seasons, published posthumously by Oliver & Boyd of Edinburgh in 1920, was a collection of sermons. His The Mysteries and Christianity also published by Oliver & Boyd in 1921, was a summary (to date at the time of Glasse's death) of the scholarship concerning paganism and early Christianity.

== Freemasonry ==
He was a Scottish Freemason. He was initiated in Lodge St David, No. 36, (Edinburgh) and was Master of that Lodge 1892-1893. He was an Honorary Member of The Lodge of Holyrood House (St Luke's), No. 44 (1908). He served as Grand Chaplain to the Grand Lodge of Scotland 1889-1890.
