= Vittorio Valletta =

Italian industrialist and politician (1883–1967)

Senator for life Vittorio Valletta
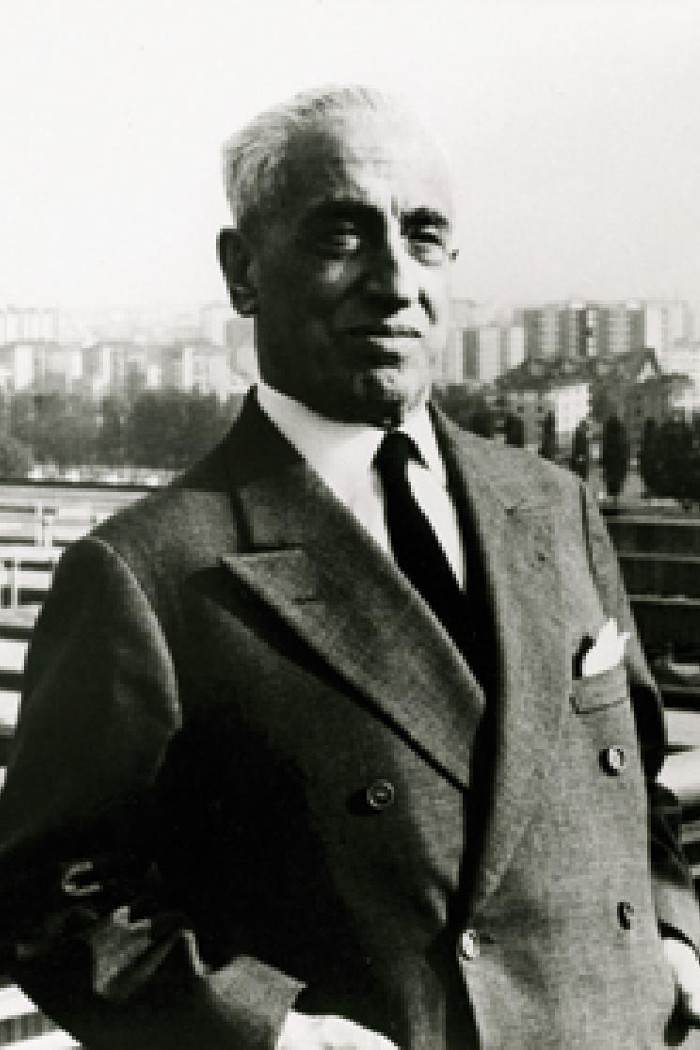
- Valletta in the late 1940s

Member of the Senate of the Republic
- In office 28 November 1966 – 10 August 1967 for life
- Appointed by: Giuseppe Saragat

Personal details
- Born: Vittorio Giuseppe Valletta; 28 July 1883 Sampierdarena, Italy
- Died: 10 August 1967 (aged 84) Pietrasanta, Italy
- Party: Independent
- Spouse(s): Carmela Manfrino (1906–1960); Felicita Dondo (1960–1967)
- Children: Fede Valletta (daughter)
- Parent(s): Federico Valletta (father); Teresa Quadrio (mother)
- Education: University of Turin
- Occupation: Industrialist
- Known for: President of Fiat S.p.A.

Vittorio Valletta (28 July 1883 – 10 August 1967) was an Italian industrialist and president of Fiat S.p.A. from 1946 to 1966.

== Early life ==
Born at Sampierdarena near Genoa, he was the son of Federico Valletta, of Brindisini origin (Palermo, 1856 – Turin, 1915), an officer of the Italian Royal Army and later an official in Turin of the Ferrovie dello Stato Italiane. His mother was Teresa Quadrio from Valtellina who belonged to a family of minor nobility; a prominent exponent of this family was the patriot Maurizio Quadrio. Valletta was a lecturer in economics before he joined Fiat in April 1921. As a result of his academic qualifications and background he was often known to colleagues and in the trade as "The Professor" (Il Professore).

Giovanni Agnelli, the company's founder, sought him as accountant. Valletta was known to the Italian fascist regime for his social democratic ideas, membership in Freemasonry, and clandestine connections with exiled anti-fascists in France, including the future president of the Italian Republic, Giuseppe Saragat, of whom he shared his reformist socialist views and was politically close to his post-war Italian Democratic Socialist Party.

== Career ==
Valletta became Fiat director in 1928 and the company's CEO in 1939. In the upheavals that followed the collapse of Benito Mussolini's fascist regime, Valletta found himself expelled from the company by the powerful trade unions that considered that he had been sympathetic to the National Fascist Party regime; he was later acquitted. While they shared mutual benefits in the field of war orders, Fiat always maintained a line of independence from the Fascist regime's totalitarian aspirations. In his work about the Italian resistance, Sergio Favretto's book argues that Fiat was actively involved alongside the resistance; the company supplied vehicles and petrol, made large sums available to support the movement, and collaborated in the sabotage of war production in its own plants.

In 1946, amid difficulties in the company's decision-making, Valletta was recalled and nominated as the company's president. He presided during two decades of the Italian economic miracle and rapid expansion as small Fiats proliferated on Italian streets, and he lived out the injunction of Agnelli to "make Fiat greater, giving more working opportunities to the people, and producing better and cheaper cars." Valletta wanted to bring American technology to Mirafiori and ensure that every Italian could buy a car, starting with the Turin workers, whom he described as "excellent, magnificent, and talented". His corporate model was based on policy salary and particular attention to the needs of workers according to a model of corporate liberality, which was defined by critics as Vallettian paternalism and contrasted to the participatory and enlightened model of Adriano Olivetti in Ivrea.

== Later life and death ==
Even though he was on the side of the Western Bloc during the Cold War and confinement departments, in which the most combative left-wing workers were marginalized, were established, Valletta was suspected by American government representatives, such as the anti-communist ambassador Clare Boothe Luce and the embassy's first secretary Clarence Durbrow, of siding with the Italian Communist Party leader Palmiro Togliatti. The anti-communist Luce repeatedly pressured Valletta, if he wanted to get work orders for his aircraft and vehicle departments, to expel all communists from Fiat, to which Valletta dismissed both the influence of the CGIL in Fiat and the danger of communism in Italy as overblown.

In the 1950s, Valletta was the sponsor of the Autostrada A1, nicknamed Autostrada del Sole ("Sun Motorway"). In an interview to Il Messaggero, he gave his support for what became known as the Organic centre-left. He continued as chairman of Fiat until, at the age of 83, he retired in April 1966 to be succeeded in that post by the founder's grandson, Gianni Agnelli. Valletta was appointed senator for life in December 1966. Then Italian president Saragat's citation described Valletta as "the first Fiat worker, and one of the great men who most contributed to the Italian economic miracle and to the welfare of the country". Valletta died of cerebral hemorrhage at his villa in Le Focette near Pietrasanta in 1967. Along with Enrico Mattei, he is regarded among the best Italian managers of the 20th century.

«Si spegne con Vittorio Valletta il più alto rappresentante di una borghesia promotrice di conquiste sociali e benessere per la classe lavoratrice, di sviluppo e progresso per la nazione. L'atmosfera seria e laboriosa di Torino gli fu congeniale e da essa trasse ispirazione e forza per fare della Fiat la massima impresa industriale italiana e per contribuire più di ogni altro a quel miracolo economico che ha collocato il nostro Paese tra le prime nazioni industriali del mondo. Inchinandomi reverente innanzi alle spoglie mortali del primo operaio della Fiat, so di interpretare il sentimento profondo della intera nazione.»

— Italian original from the message of condolence to the family, sent on 10 August 1967 by the president of the Italian Republic, Giuseppe Saragat

"The highest representative of a bourgeoisie promoting social conquests and well-being for the working class, development, and progress for the nation, dies with Vittorio Valletta. The serious and industrious atmosphere of Turin was congenial to him and from it he drew the inspiration and strength to make Fiat the leading Italian industrial company and to contribute more than any other to that economic miracle which placed our country among the first industrial nations of the world. Bowing reverently before the mortal remains of the first Fiat worker, I know I am interpreting the deep feeling of the entire nation."

— English translation from the message of condolence to the family, sent on 10 August 1967 by the president of the Italian Republic, Giuseppe Saragat

In July 2017, to commemorate the 60th year since his death, the Italian Ministry of Economic Development issued a postage stamp in honour of Valletta.

== Bibliography ==
- Agnelli, Giovanni; Romiti, Cesare; Carli, Guido; Colombo, Umberto; Dadda, Luigi; Ossola, Rinaldo; Pirelli, Leopoldo (1993). Linea d'orizzonte. Scritti in onore di Vittorio Valletta nel centenario della nascita (in Italian). Turin: Giovanni Agnelli Foundation. pp. XI, 296. OCLC 1051211642. Archived from the original on 18 May 2019 – via Byterfly.
