= Frances Frenaye =

American translator (1908–1996)

Frances Frenaye Lanza (née Frenaye; April 2, 1908 – April 12, 1996) was an American translator of French and Italian literature. She translated work by writers including Giovanni Guareschi, Balzac, Carlo Levi, Natalia Ginzburg, Ignazio Silone, Elie Wiesel, Alberto Moravia, Dacia Maraini, and Antonio Tabucchi, and received significant praise from critics. For her 1976 translation of Giuseppe Dessì's Paese d'ombre (The Forests of Norbio), Frenaye was awarded the John Florio Prize for Italian Translation; her translations of Georges Blond's The Plunderers (L'Épopée de la mer) and Henri-René Lenormand's Renée earned her the 1951 Denyse Clairouin Memorial Award.

Born in Lawrence, Long Island, to a family of distant French descent, Frenaye attended the Shipley School in Bryn Mawr, Pennsylvania, and went on to graduate from Bryn Mawr College in 1930, after which she spent six years in Europe, mostly Paris and Rome. During World War II, she worked as an official for the Justice Department in Washington, and subsequently was a columnist for Italian newspaper Il Mondo as well as, from 1963 to 1980, the newsletter editor for the Italian Cultural Institute in Manhattan, where she lived for about 50 years.

In 1939, Frenaye married Italian nobleman Angelo Lanza di Trabia from Sicily, from whom she separated in 1961 when he traveled back to Italy; they had one daughter. She died at her apartment in Miami Beach at the age of 88.

== Selected works ==
- Natalia Ginzburg: The Road to the City (Ital.: La strada che va in città), 1942
- Ignazio Silone: The Seed Beneath the Snow (Ital.: Il seme sotto la neve), 1943
- Natalia Ginzburg: The Dry Heart (Ital.: È stato così), 1947
- Carlo Levi: Christ Stopped at Eboli (Ital.: Cristo si è fermato a Eboli), London, Cassell, 1948.
- Giovannino Guareschi: Don Camillo and the Prodigal Son (Ital.: Mondo Piccolo: Don Camillo e il suo gregge), Victor Gollancz, 1952
- Riccardo Bacchelli: The Mill on the Po (Ital.: Il mulino del Po), 1952
- Alberto Moravia: Bitter Honeymoon (Ital.: Luna di miele, sole di fiele), 1954
- Giovannino Guareschi: Don Camillo's Dilemma (Ital.: Il dilemma di Don Camillo), Victor Gollancz Ltd, 1954
- Anna Maria Ortese: The Bay Is Not Naples (Ital.: Il mare non bagna Napoli), 1955
- Honoré de Balzac: César Birotteau (Fr.: Histoire de la grandeur et de la décadence de César Birotteau), 1956
- Giovannino Guareschi: Don Camillo and the Devil (Ital.: Don Camillo e il diavolo), Victor Gollancz Ltd, 1957
- Françoise Sagan: Those Without Shadows (Fr.: Dans un mois, dans un an), 1957
- Daria Olivier: The Snows of December (Fr.: Les Neiges de décembre), 1959
- Elie Wiesel: Dawn (Fr.: L'aube), Hill and Wang, 1961
- Armand Lanoux: Rendezvous at Bruges (Fr.: Le Rendez-vous de Bruges), 1961
- Dacia Maraini: The Age of Discontent (Ital.: L'età del malessere), 1963
- Giovannino Guareschi: Comrade Don Camillo (Ital.: Il compagno Don Camillo), Victor Gollancz Ltd, 1964
- Elie Wiesel: The Gates of the Forest (Fr.: Les Portes de la forêt), Holt, Rinehart and Winston, 1966
- Elio Vittorini: Women of Messina (Ital.: Le donne di Messina), 1973
- Giuseppe Dessì: The Forests of Norbio (Ital.: Paese d'ombre: Romanzo), Harcourt Brace Jovanovich, 1975: winner of the 1976 John Florio Prize
- Antonio Tabucchi: Little Misunderstandings of No Importance (Ital.: Piccoli equivoci senza importanza), 1985
