= Community Movement =

Community Movement Movimento Comunità
- Leader: Adriano Olivetti
- Founded: 1947
- Dissolved: 1961
- Newspaper: Comunità
- Ideology: Liberal socialism Fabianism; Federalism
- Political position: Centre-left

The Community Movement was an Italian political organization founded by Piedmontese progressive entrepreneur Adriano Olivetti in 1947.

Olivetti had previously established a cultural group, which only subsequently began a political activity at local level, entering in municipal and provincial elections. The Community fought against particracy and Jacobin centralism, aiming to replace them with a federal union of local communities. The movement tried to merge both liberal and socialist ideas, opposing both conservatives and communists.

The movement successfully engaged the 1958 general election, Olivetti becoming MP for Piedmont, but the history of Community was dramatically stopped in 1960 when its founder died of heart failure.

Community's political ideas disappeared from Italian political debate for thirty years and its only MP, professor Franco Ferrarotti, joined the Italian Democratic Socialist Party.

== Election results ==
=== Chamber of Deputies ===
Election	Votes	%	Seats	Leader
1958	173,227 (#10)	0.59	1 / 596	Adriano Olivetti

=== Senate ===
Election	Votes	%	Seats	Leader
1958	142,897 (#10)	0.55	0 / 246	Adriano Olivetti

== Sources ==
- Olivetti Foundation
- Olivetti's life (it.)
- Adriano Olivetti: the red entrepreneur (it.) La Storia siamo Noi – RAI
