= Adriano Olivetti =

Italian engineer, politician, and industrialist (1901–1960)

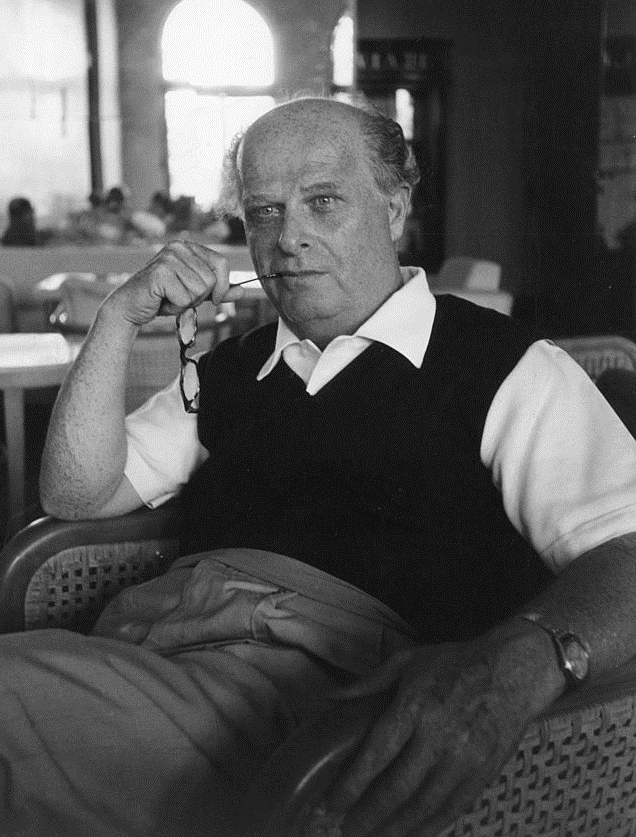
- Adriano Olivetti in Venice, 1957

Member of the Chamber of Deputies
- In office 12 June 1958 – 5 November 1959
- Constituency: Turin

Personal details
- Born: 11 April 1901 Ivrea, Kingdom of Italy
- Died: 27 February 1960 (aged 58) Aigle, Switzerland
- Party: Community Movement
- Education: Polytechnic University of Turin
- Profession: Engineer, industrialist
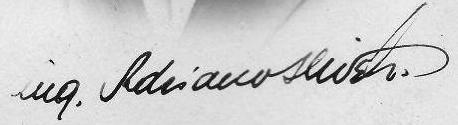
- Signature

Adriano Olivetti (11 April 1901 – 27 February 1960) was an Italian engineer, entrepreneur, politician, and industrialist. He was known worldwide during his lifetime as the Italian manufacturer of Olivetti brand typewriters, calculators, and computers. He was son of the founder of Olivetti, Camillo Olivetti, and Luisa Revel, the daughter of a prominent Waldensian pastor and scholar. The Olivetti empire had been founded by his father.

The Olivetti factory initially consisted of 30 workers and concentrated on electric measurement devices. By 1908, the company started to produce typewriters.

Adriano Olivetti transformed shop-like operations into a modern factory. He founded the utopian system of the Community Movement. In his company, apart from managers and technicians, he enrolled a large number of artists like writers and architects, following his interest in design and urban and building planning that were closely linked with his personal utopian vision. His participatory and enlightened corporate model was contrasted to the paternalism of Fiat S.p.A.'s Vittorio Valletta.

== Biography ==
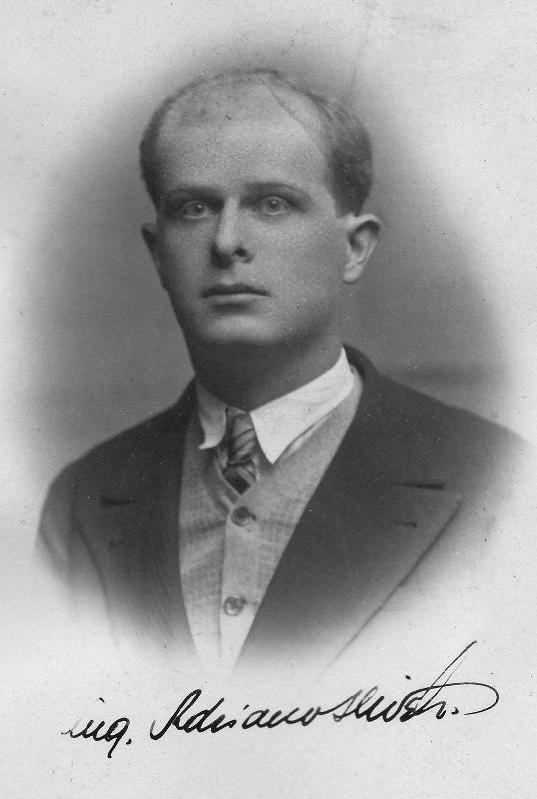
Olivetti in 1925 with his signature

Olivetti's father, Camillo Olivetti, who was Jewish, believed that his children could get a better education at home. Olivetti's formative years were spent under the tutelage of his mother, daughter of the local Waldensian pastor, an educated and sober woman. As a socialist, his father emphasized the non-differentiation between manual and intellectual work. During their time away from study, his children worked with and under the same conditions as his workers. The discipline and sobriety the older Olivetti imposed on his family induced rebellion in the younger Olivetti's adolescence manifested by a dislike of his father's workplace and by his studying at a polytechnic school of subjects other than the mechanical engineering that his father wanted.

After graduation in chemical engineering at the Polytechnic University of Turin in 1924, Olivetti joined the company for a short while. When he became undesirable to Benito Mussolini's Italian fascist regime, his father sent him to the United States to learn the roots of American industrial power. For the same reasons, he later went to England. Upon his return, he married Paola Levi, a daughter of Giuseppe Levi and a sister of his good friend Natalia Ginzburg, a marriage that produced three children but did not last long.

His visit to various plants in the United States, especially Remington, convinced Olivetti that productivity is a function of the organizational system. With the approval of father, he organized the production system at Olivetti on a quasi-Taylorian model and transformed the shop into a factory with departments and divisions. Possibly as a result of this reorganization, output per man-hour doubled within five years. Olivetti for the first time sold half of the typewriters used in Italy in 1933. He shared with his workers the productivity gains by increasing salaries, fringe benefits, and services.

In 1931, he visited the Soviet Union and created an Advertising Department at Olivetti that worked with artists and designers. The creation of an Organization Office followed one year later, when he became general manager, and the project for the first portable typewriter started. His success in business did not diminish his idealism. In the 1930s, he developed an interest in architecture, as well as urban and community planning. He supervised a housing plan for the workers at Ivrea, a small city near Turin, where the Olivetti plant is still located, and a zoning proposal for the adjacent Aosta Valley. In Fascist Italy, patronizing workers at work and at home was in line with the corporative design of the regime. While Olivetti showed distaste for the regime, he joined the National Fascist Party and became a Catholic. During World War II, he participated in the underground anti-fascist and Italian resistance movements, was jailed, and at the end sought refuge in Switzerland. There, he was in close contact with the intellectual emigrees and he was able to further develop his socio-philosophy of the Community Movement. He also had contacts with representatives of Britain's Special Operations Executive. With these, he tried to avoid the Allied invasion of Italy and to obtain a negotiated Italian retreat from the war assuming a mediation of the Holy See and making strong the support that he enjoyed with influential Italian political circles.

During the immediate post-war years, the Olivetti empire expanded rapidly, only to be briefly on the verge of bankruptcy after the acquisition of Underwood Typewriter Company in the late 1950s. During this period, first calculators and then computers replaced the typewriter as a prime production focus. Olivetti shared his time between business pursuits and attempts to practice and spread the utopian ideal of community life. His belief was that people who respect each other and their environment can avoid war and poverty. His utopian idea was similar to that preached by socialists, such as Charles Fourier and Robert Owen, during the previous century.

=== From the Post-World War I period to the years of Fascist consensus ===
In 1919, he collaborated with his father in the editing of "L'Azione Riformista," as evidenced by numerous references from his father, although we are unable to identify articles written by Adriano Olivetti as they were either anonymous or signed with a pseudonym. When, in 1920, Camillo decided to suspend the publication of that Canavese weekly, which he considered too provincial and lacking real influence in politics, Adriano persuaded his father to transfer the publication to him "and his young friends," but it did not go beyond 1920.

We know that he also collaborated with "Tempi Nuovi," the Turin political weekly promoted by his father along with Donato Bachi (who became its director) and other progressives. With the newspaper's first critical and then more marked anti-fascist turn, there was also a political shift for Adriano Olivetti, influenced by the cultural environment of the Polytechnic and his friendship with the Levi family, especially with Gino Levi, his course mate.

In 1924, he earned a degree in chemical engineering from the Polytechnic of Turin and, after a study trip to the United States with Domenico Burzio (Technical Director of Olivetti), where he updated himself on organizational business practices, he joined his father's factory in 1926. At the request of Camillo, he gained initial work experience as a laborer. He became the director of Olivetti in 1932, the year in which he launched the first portable typewriters called MP1 typewriters, and the president in 1938.

Adriano opposed the fascist regime with moments of active militancy. However, from articles in "Tempi Nuovi," at least until 1923, it is known that the editorial team had a relationship of mutual respect with Turin fascism led by Mario Gioda, who, although disappearing in 1924, left many followers in the Turin federation. Adriano's anti-fascism had already been expressed immediately after the discovery of Giacomo Matteotti's body in the demonstration he organized, together with his father, at the Giacosa theater in Ivrea in 1924.

He participated in the liberation of Filippo Turati with Carlo Rosselli, Ferruccio Parri, Sandro Pertini and others. By educational inclination, he was close to the Giustizia e Libertà political movement. Along with the Levi family, Adriano was among the protagonists of the daring escape: initially hosted by the Levis in their home in Turin, Turati then reached Ivrea. He stopped for the night at the home of Giuseppe Pero, an executive at Olivetti, and left the next morning in a car driven by Adriano, which reached Savona, where Pertini awaited them. Together, they sailed to Corsica and then reached France and Paris. How Adriano Olivetti managed not to be involved in the fascist investigation that followed Turati's escape is unclear. Two hypotheses can be formulated: one related to the fortune or superficiality of the investigations, and the other (which can only be hypothesized) involving protections from the Turin "giodiani" circles.

From 1931, the Aosta police (from whom the entrepreneur needed certification of Aryan race membership due to his father's Jewish origins) defined the young Olivetti as subversive. Adriano Olivetti was later appointed General Manager and, alongside assuming responsibilities in the Ivrea factory, demonstrated greater caution toward the regime. He then married Paola Levi, Gino's sister, in a civil ceremony. Paola, intolerant of the provincialism of Ivrea, convinced him to move his residence to Milan. This was one of the cultural turning points for Adriano because in Milan, he could meet the intelligentsia that later brought him closer to architecture, urban planning, psychology, and sociology. He still had problems with the regime when Gino Levi and Paola Levi's brother, Mario (who worked at Olivetti), was stopped at the Swiss border with a car full of Justice and Liberty pamphlets. He managed to escape, but the consequence was that Gino Levi and their father were arrested, remaining in the homeland's prisons for about two months.

During that time, Adriano mobilized and spent a lot of his money to defend his father-in-law and brother-in-law. This was the period when Camillo Olivetti's passport was temporarily withdrawn. However, relations with fascism improved in the thirties. It was mainly the meeting with architects Luigi Figini and Gino Pollini, who were at the forefront of architectural rationalism that was initially supported by Mussolini. The two architects corresponded to the great Le Corbusier, who, for a certain period, was also an admirer of Mussolini during those years defined as the years of consensus. Figini and Pollini joined the fascist party.

Certainly, Adriano was influenced by them; they would be the architects of the new Olivetti and, with Adriano, contributors to the plan for the Aosta Valley (of which Ivrea was part during those years). We do not know with how much conviction, but it is proven that Adriano Olivetti was definitively removed from the central political record in 1937 and requested—and obtained—a membership card from the National Fascist Party (PNF). Not only that; he was also received by Mussolini at Palazzo Venezia, where the entrepreneur from Ivrea presented his plan to Il Duce. In any case, the plan for the Aosta Valley received recognition and was exhibited in a show in Rome. Newspapers covered it, as evidenced by a letter that Camillo wrote to Adriano:

"Mr. Adriano Olivetti Rome, I have seen your articles in La Stampa and Gazzetta del Popolo regarding the plan for the Province of Aosta, and I hope that this work of yours can bring you much glory but few troubles. On Gazzetta del Popolo, I noticed that your name has been omitted. I don't know if the article was written by you (in which case, I warn you not to be too modest) or by others who did not want to mention your name, in which case, I would like to know the reason (…)"

(Letter found in the Olivetti historical archive)

His political affiliations during that period were with Giuseppe Bottai, who always represented a dissenting voice within fascism. Prudent enough not to be expelled like Massimo Rocca, Bottai was still a free spirit representing the other side of fascism, the less totalitarian and more problematic one. However, these qualities did not prevent Bottai from being a staunch promoter of the Manifesto of Race and one of the most fanatical supporters of fascist racial laws. His connection with the regime was of short duration. In architecture, Mussolini's tastes changed: from rationalism, he shifted to a regime architecture intended to echo the splendors of Imperial Rome. In any case, the plan for the Aosta Valley had another exhibition in Rome, and newspapers covered it, as evidenced by a letter that Camillo wrote to Adriano.

Then there was silence, with the war in Africa first, the Spanish Civil War, and then the Second World War. Adriano Olivetti's consensus weakened until it led him to open anti-fascism. Badoglio accused him of portraying Italy in a bad light with the USA. During the war years, he sought refuge in Switzerland, where he maintained contact with the Resistance.

=== Post-war era and involvement in the Community Movement ===
Upon his return from exile with the fall of the regime, he resumed leadership of the company. Alongside his managerial skills that made Olivetti the world's leading office products company, he sought to harmonize industrial development with the assertion of human rights and participatory democracy, both inside and outside the factory.

In 1945, Olivetti published The Political Order of Communities, considered the theoretical basis for a federalist idea of the state, which, in his vision, was based on communities—territorial units that were culturally homogeneous and economically autonomous. He became a supporter of European federalism after meeting Altiero Spinelli during his exile in Switzerland, initiated by Olivetti in 1944 due to his anti-fascist activities.

In 1949, Olivetti converted to Catholicism "due to the conviction of its superior theology." Towards the end of the forties, he was for a period in analysis with Ernst Bernhard.

The ideas advocated in The Political Order of Communities supported the Community Movement, founded by him in the city of Turin in 1948. In 1950, he presented his vision of the primacy of Urban Planning and Planning in politics. Under the influence of business success and his communal ideals, in the fifties, Ivrea gathered an extraordinary number of intellectuals working (some within the company, some within the Community Movement) in different disciplinary fields, pursuing the project of a creative synthesis between technical-scientific culture and humanistic culture.

The movement, attempting to unite the socialist and liberal wings under a single banner socialism gained considerable importance in Italy in the fifties in the fields of economic, social, and political culture. The political initiative aimed to create a socio-technocratic movement of around thirty deputies capable of constituting the balance between the center (dominated by the Christian Democracy) and the left (dominated by the Italian Communist Party).

In the fifties, along with Guido Nadzo, he was one of the leaders of the UNRRA, when there was an attempt to operate organically in urban terms. He became a promoter of a sociological study on the Sassi di Matera and the subsequent realization of the La Martella village La Martella. In 1955, during the second edition of the Compasso d'Oro Award, Adriano Olivetti was awarded the first "Gran Premio Nazionale," a prestigious recognition for his influence on Italian industry and design.

In 1958, Olivetti was elected as a deputy representing "Community." His premature death marked the end of the movement.

Meanwhile, Adriano had remarried in 1950 to Grazia Galletti, several years after divorcing Paola. At that time, he already had three children: Roberto (who would succeed him at the helm of the company), Lidia, and Anna. With Grazia, he had another daughter, Laura. In the same year, he joined the Board of Directors of the National Institute of Urban Planning, which he had joined ten years earlier. In 1937, he had participated in a series of studies on a master plan for the Aosta Valley.

Urban planning was just one of Olivetti's many passions; he also delved into history, philosophy, literature, and art. He personally funded the revival of the Urbanistica magazine. In 1953, he decided to open a calculator factory in Pozzuoli, offering above-average salaries and assistance to workers' families. The productivity at this facility surpassed that of the colleagues in the Ivrea factory.

In 1956, he was elected mayor of Ivrea, and two years later, he obtained two seats in Parliament by running with the Community Movement. His vote was significant for the vote of confidence in the Fanfani government. During his city administration, the fountain dedicated to his father, Camillo, was inaugurated on 29 September 1957. Also in 1957, the National Management Association of New York awarded Olivetti for his international business leadership. In 1959, he was appointed president of the UNRRA-Casas Institute, tasked with overseeing post-war reconstruction in Italy.

=== Death ===
On 27 February 1960, Olivetti took a train from Arona, Piedmont, in the north of Italy, towards Lausanne, Switzerland. A few kilometres after the border between the two countries, he had a heart attack that led to his death, according to a doctor who attended him. The doctor requested an autopsy, however, it was never performed. Author Meryle Secrest published a book in 2019 contending that Olivetti and his chief engineer were both murdered by the CIA. Some reviewers thought the evidence was worth a deeper look. However, others found it far-fetched.
