= The Dry Heart =

1947 novella by Natalia Ginzburg

- Author: Natalia Ginzburg
- Original title: È stato cosi
- Translator: Frances Frenaye
- Language: Italian
- Genre: Literary fiction, psychological thriller
- Publisher: Einaudi, New Directions
- Publication date: 1947
- Pages: 88
- ISBN: 9780811228787

The Dry Heart (Italian: È stato cosi, lit. 'It was like this') is a 1947 novella by Italian author and activist Natalia Ginzburg. The story follows a young woman who kills her husband, exploring their relationship and her motives for the murder. The Dry Heart was translated into English from its original Italian by Frances Frenaye in 1952.

== Publication ==
The Dry Heart is her first novel published under her real name, Natalia Ginzburg, as when she wrote her first novel in 1942, La strada che va in città (transl. The Road to the City), Italian Jews were not allowed to publish books. She published under the pseudonym Alessandra Tornimparte.

The novella was rereleased in 2019 by New Directions publishing, sparking a renewed interest in the book and Ginzburg's fiction.

== Synopsis ==
The narrator, who remains unnamed, opens the story by shooting her husband in the head. She then ruminates on what led her to this decision, beginning when she was 26 and working as a school teacher. There she met Alfredo, a much older man who takes an interest in her and frequently visits her at the boarding school. Alfredo never directly says he loves her, but the narrator interprets his gifts and visits as a sign of romantic interest. After spending the summer at her childhood home, the narrator realizes she is in love with Alfredo. The next school year, she confesses her feelings and although he does not feel the same, he proposes to marry her. The narrator's friend, Francesca, deplores this idea.

After marrying Alfredo, the narrator settles into a reluctant new routine: she quits her job, tolerates her husband's affairs with a previous love, Giovanna, and spends her days at his family home. Alfredo frequently lies to her about his whereabouts, claiming to be with his friend Augusto when he is in fact with Giovanna. After having a baby, Francesca visits, having fallen out with her family. Francesca criticizes the narrator for her new lifestyle and says she will never marry. One day, Alfredo decides he must be alone and begins to move out. While he does so, Francesca happily accompanies the narrator and her daughter on vacation. Augusto joins on account of his implied love for Francesca. There, the baby catches meningitis and dies.

Upon returning home, Alfredo decides to no longer move out. They try for another baby. The narrator meets Giovanna, whom is Alfredo's age, and she expresses regret for her child's passing. After some time, Alfredo says he is going on a trip again, concealing the fact that it will be with Giovanna. Even after confronted with his lie, he does not come clean, prompting the narrator to shoot him. The novella ends as the narrator contemplates what to do next, ultimately deciding she will document her reasons in writing.

== Reception ==
In 1947, Piemonte’s L’Unitá newspaper published a review of The Dry Heart, then Ginzburg's second novel. In the review, Italo Calvino wrote that Ginzburg had an unparalleled ability to write, despite being a woman. He compares her work to other Italian female writers like Grazia Deledda and Caterina Percoto. Calvino ends his positive review by claiming the reader must finish The Dry Heart in one sitting.

After its 2019 rerelease by New Directions, The Dry Heart generally received positive reviews and saw an increase in popularity. Kirkus Reviews praises the novella for feeling modern in its structure and subject matter, despite being written over half a century ago. In a piece for the European Literature Network, The Dry Heart is praised for its compact plot line and prose. The reviewer calls the book "a perfectly managed novella about how a failed relationship ends in tragedy." Merve Emre, writing for Public Books, calls The Dry Heart an "anti-Romantic novella" and praises the book's feminist themes.

In the Los Angeles Review of Books, Victoria Baena discusses the brutality of the murder in The Dry Heart and reflects how Ginzburg continued to discuss themes of failed romantic relationships and domestic life in her later works. The Jewish Book Council published a review on The Dry Heart, praising Ginzburg for making her narrator's otherwise mundane daily life intriguing.
