= Matteo Marangoni =

Italian art historian and composer

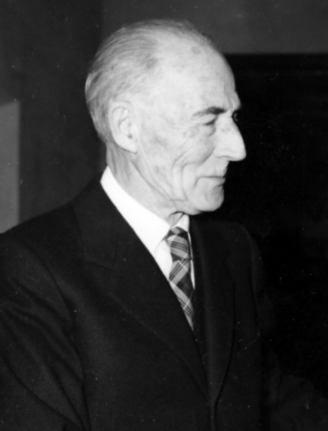
Matteo Marangoni

Matteo Marangoni (12 July 1876 – 1 June 1958) was an Italian art historian, art critic and composer.

Marangoni's art criticism aimed at identifying pure figurative values, in which an artwork's poetic values are identified. His books are positively influenced by the school of Benedetto Croce and Heinrich Wölfflin, clarifying their concepts on the basis of observation and following logic as a science of pure concept.

== Life ==
Born in Florence, Italy, to Maria Augusta Malvisi and her physics-teacher husband Carlo Marangoni, he took his secondary school diploma in 1896 but did not continue with his studies straight away, instead moving to London to indulge his passion for music. There he performed as a pianist and composed short pieces for voice and piano – Barcarola in 1897, Serenata in 1900, Le pastorelle montanine di Franco Sacchetti in 1901, Tre canti di Giacomo Leopardi in 1902 and Gavotta, also in 1902.

He later returned to Florence and attended the Facoltà di scienze, graduating in 1905 in anthropology. He then moved to Paris and back to London as well as travelling in Germany, becoming interested in the figurative arts. On his second return to Italy in 1909 he took an art history course in Bologna and in 1910 married Drusilla Tanzi, with whom he had a son, Andrea. In the same year as his marriage he became a volunteer at the Superintendency of Arts in Florence, later becoming its inspector (1913) and director. He also taught art history at the Collegio della SS. Annunziata on Poggio Imperiale from 1916 to 1925 and was briefly director of the Pinacoteca di Brera (1920) and the Galleria nazionale di Parma (1924).

During this period he became particularly interested in 17th century art, publishing several articles on that era in the "L'Arte", "Bollettino d'arte", "Dedalo", "Rassegna d'arte", "Rivista d'arte" and "Vita d'Arte" arts reviews. In 1925 the University of Palermo commissioned an art history course from him and the following year became a visiting lecturer at the University of Pisa. In 1927 he published Arte barocca (Baroque Art) and Come si guarda un quadro (How to look at a picture), followed in 1933 by Saper vedere (Knowing how to look). From 1938 he taught art history at the University of Milan, returning to Pisa from 1946 until his retirement in 1951.

In 1953 he published Capire la musica (How to understand music), spending his final years in Pisa, where he also died and where a street is named after him. His last work, a monograph on Guercino, was published in the year after his death.

== Works ==
- Il Guercino, Firenze, Fratelli Alinari, 1920
- Il Caravaggio, Firenze, Battistelli, 1922
- La Basilica di S. Lorenzo in Firenze, Firenze, Battistelli, 1922
- La Villa del Poggio Imperiale, Firenze, Fratelli Alinari, 1923
- I Carloni, Firenze, Fratelli Alinari, 1925
- La Galleria Pitti, Milano, Fratelli Treves, 1926
- Arte barocca, Firenze, Vallecchi, 1927
- Come si guarda un quadro, Firenze, Vallecchi, 1927
- Saper vedere, Milano-Roma, Fratelli Treves, Treccani, Tumminelli, 1933
- Capire la musica, Milano, Garzanti, 1953
- Guercino, Milano, Aldo Martello, 1959
- Carteggi (1909–1958), a cura di Luca Barreca, Palermo, Editrice Mediterranea, 2006
