= The Advertisement =

The Advertisement (Italian: L'Inserzione) is a theatre play by Italian writer Natalia Ginzburg, first performed in Great Britain by the National Theatre in 1968.

== Plot summary ==
A three-act play, The Advertisement looks at the relationship between Teresa and Elena, and Teresa's former lover Lorenzo. Responding to an advertisement in a local paper, Elena, a young student, comes to inspect a room that Teresa has put up for rent in her house. The two develop a bond, and Teresa explains her history with Lorenzo, a lover who has left her. But the three-way relationship takes a turn when Lorenzo turns up at the house and subsequently begins an affair with Elena.

== Characters ==
- Teresa
- Elena
- Lorenzo
- Giovanna
- A Boy

== Production history ==
The Advertisement was given its world premiere at the Theatre Royal in Brighton, Great Britain, in a production by the National Theatre, and subsequently transferred to London's Old Vic Theatre, in 1968. The original cast consisted of Joan Plowright (Teresa), Anna Carteret (Elena), Edward Petherbridge (Lorenzo) and Helen Bourne (Gionvanna). Derek Jacobi later took over the role of Lorenzo. At the time of the Old Vic premiere, the BBC broadcast a radio adaptation of it.

== Publication ==
The playtext was published in 1969 by Faber and Faber, in a translation by Henry Reed.
