= Ernst Bernhard =

Jungian psychoanalyst and astrologer

Ernst Bernhard (1896–1965) was a German Jungian psychoanalyst, pediatrician and astrologer. Refused asylum by Britain in 1935, he lived in Rome, Italy from 1936 onwards. Following the fascist Italian racial laws of 1938, Bernhard was sent to the internment camp, Ferramonti di Tarsia, in Calabria where he remained until the liberation of the camp by the Allies in September 1943.

== Works ==
- Mitobiografia, 1969
