= David Lowe (socialist) =

Scottish socialist activist (1867–1947)

David Lowe (1867 – 18 November 1947) was a Scottish socialist activist.

Born in Dundee, Lowe moved to Glasgow in his youth, where he worked closely with Keir Hardie, becoming the first assistant editor of the Labour Leader newspaper. He returned to Dundee in 1888, still working for the newspaper, and becoming the leading figure in the Scottish Labour Party in the city. At the 1892 general election, he was the election agent for James MacDonald's unsuccessful candidacy in Dundee. He subsequently joined the Independent Labour Party, and through that became a founding activist in the Labour Party.

Lowe continued to write in support of the labour movement throughout his life, notably writing Souvenirs of Scottish Labour in 1919, a history of the Scottish Labour Party. He remained a close lifelong friend of Hardie's.

Lowe was an accomplished writer, with many of his works kept at the Mitchell Library in Glasgow. He was an acknowledged expert on Robbie Burns, wrote poetry and plays and a biography of Keir Hardie. Works include 'From Pit to Parliament - the story of the early life of James Keir Hardie', 'A Scots Wanderjahre', 'Sonnets of Sweet Sorrow', 'Gift of the Night and Other Poems', 'Ballad of a Great City', 'A Man of Leisure - a play in three acts'.

David Lowe married Annie Greig and they had two children.
