= Pizzoli =

Pizzoli Pizzuli (Neapolitan)
- Comune
- Comune di Pizzoli
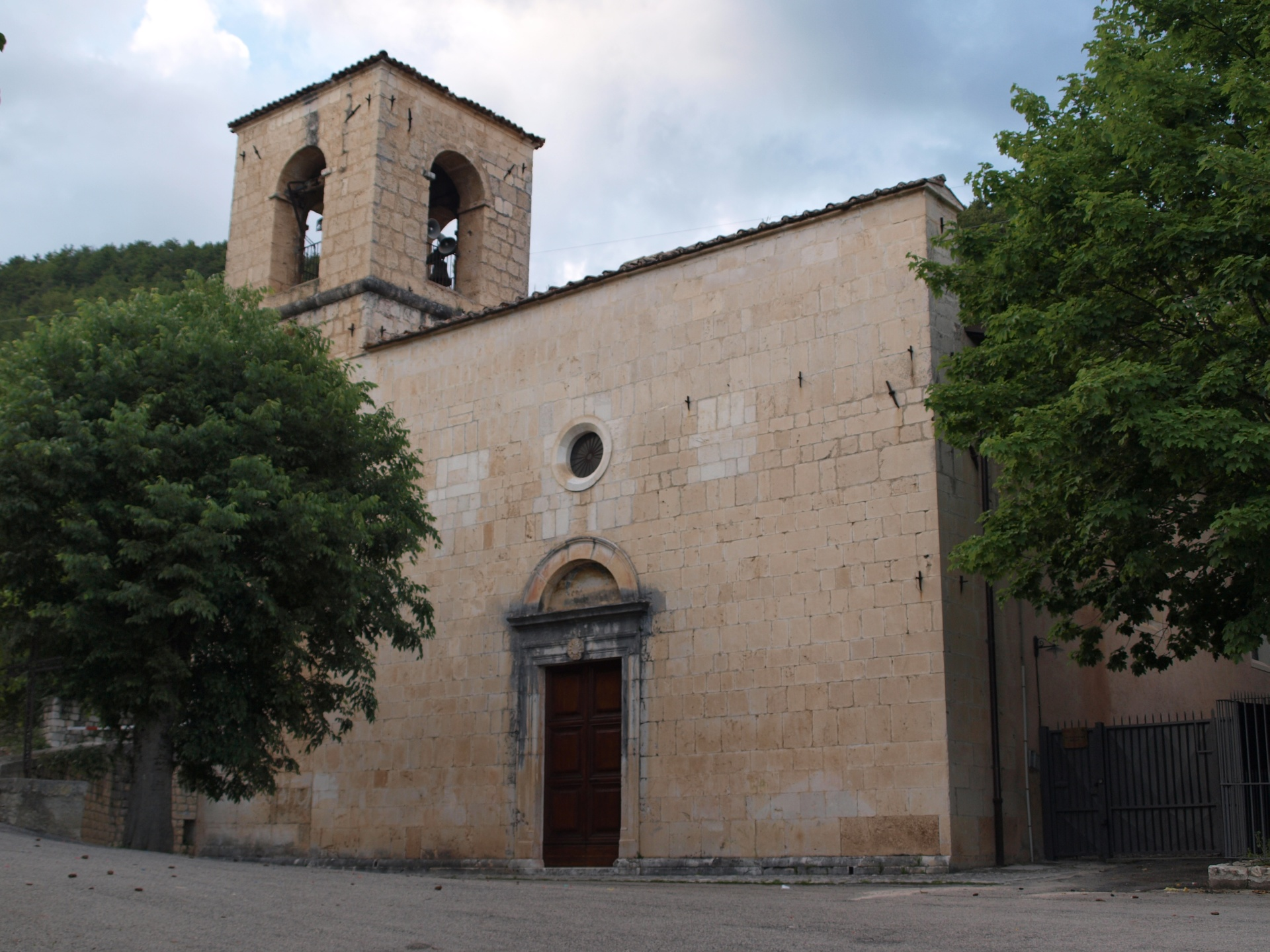
- Church of Santo Stefano Protomartire.

- Location within Italy Location within Abruzzo
- Coordinates: 42°25′59″N 13°18′45″E
- Country: Italy
- Region: Abruzzo
- Province: L'Aquila (AQ)
- Frazioni: Cavallari, Marruci, San Lorenzo, Villa San Pietro

Government
  - Mayor: Giovannino Anastasio

Area
  - Total: 56.44 km^{2} (21.79 sq mi)
- Elevation: 740 m (2,430 ft)

Population (30 November 2017)
  - Total: 4,589
  - Density: 81.31/km^{2} (210.6/sq mi)
- Demonym: Pizzolani
- Time zone: UTC+1 (CET)
  - Summer (DST): UTC+2 (CEST)
- Postal code: 67017
- Dialing code: 0862
- Patron saint: St. Stephen
- Saint day: 26 December
- Website: Official website

Pizzoli (Italian: [ˈpittsoli]; Aquilano: Pizzuli) is a town and comune (municipality) in the province of L'Aquila, in the Abruzzo region of Italy. It is located in the Gran Sasso e Monti della Laga National Park.
