= Lisa Ginzburg =

Italian author, translator and philosopher (born 1965)

Lisa Ginzburg (born 25 October 1966) is an Italian author, translator and philosopher. She currently lives in Paris.

== Biography ==
The daughter of Carlo Ginzburg and Anna Rossi-Doria, she graduated in philosophy at the Sapienza University in Rome and further specialized her studies at the Scuola Normale Superiore in Pisa, Tuscany. At first, she dedicated her studies to French mysticism from the Seventeenth century (particularly worthy of being mentioned is the edition of Jeanne Guyon's A Commentary on the Song of Solomon, with the Italian title of Commento mistico al Cantico dei cantici, Genoa, Marietti, 1997). She also worked as a translator (among others, she translated Alexander Kojève's The Emperor Julian and His Art of Writing, with the Italian title of L'imperatore Giuliano e l'arte della scrittura, Roma, Donzelli, 1998 and William Shakespeare's Love's Labour's Lost, with the Italian title of Pene d'amore perdute, Torino, Einaudi, 2002). Moreover, she contributed to Italian newspapers and magazines, such as Il Messaggero and Domus. She edited, together with Cesare Garboli, È difficile parlare di sé, a multilateral conversation led by Marino Sinibaldi, which was published by Einaudi in 1999 and later translated into German (Es fällt schwer, von sich selbst zu sprechen, aber es ist schön, Berlin, Wagenbach, 2001) and English (It's hard to talk about yourself, Chicago, The University of Chicago Press, 2003).

She published the collection of stories, Colpi d'ala (Feltrinelli, 2006) and Spietati i mansueti (Gaffi, 2016), and the novels Desiderava la bufera (Feltrinelli, 2002), Per amore (Marsilio, 2016). In 2021 her novel Cara pace (Ponte alle Grazie, 2020) was shortlisted for the LXXV edition of the Strega Prize, nominated by Nadia Terranova.

== Works ==
- Mercati: viaggio nell'Italia che vende, Rome, Editori Riuniti, 2001
- Desiderava la bufera, Milan, Feltrinelli, 2002
- Anita: storia di Anita Garibaldi, Rome, E/O, 2005
- Colpi d'ala, Milan, Feltrinelli, 2006
- Malìa Bahia, Rome-Bari, Laterza, 2007
- Per amore, Venice, Marsilio, 2016
- Spietati i mansueti, Rome, Gaffi, 2016
- Buongiorno mezzanotte, torno a casa, Rome, Italo Svevo, 2018
- Pura invenzione. Dodici variazioni su Frankenstein di Mary Shelley, Venice, Marsilio, 2019
- Cara pace, Milan, Ponte alle Grazie, 2020
- Jeanne Moreau. La luce del rigore, Rome, Giulio Perrone, 2021
