= Silvio Tanzi =

Italian composer

Silvio Tanzi (1879 – 29 November 1909) was an Italian composer and music critic. He was born in Sassello and died in Milan.

He was the brother of writer Drusilla Tanzi who was married to Nobel laureate Eugenio Montale.

== In the poetry by Eugenio Montale ==
Eugenio Montale remembered his wife's brother in the poem Your brother died young, thirteenth text of the first book of Xenia :

“Your brother died young; you were

the ruffled girl who looks

at me 'posing' in the oval of a portrait.

He wrote unpublished music, unheard of,

now buried in a trunk or go

to the màcero. Perhaps

someone unwittingly reinvents them, if what is written is written.

I loved him without having known him.

Apart from you, no one remembered it.

I didn't do research: now it's useless.

After you I remained the only one

for whom he existed. But it is possible,

you know, to love a shadow, shadows ourselves. "
