= D. M. Low =

David Morrice Low (1890 – 24 June 1972) was a British academic and biographer of Edward Gibbon.

He was educated at Westminster School and Oriel College, Oxford. He was declared unfit for active service upon the outbreak of the First World War and became an assistant master at Marlborough College. He performed the same role at Westminster School from 1919 to 1921 before serving as Rector of Kelvinside Academy in Glasgow from 1921 to 1929. During the Second World War he worked at the Air Ministry (1941–43). He was lecturer in classics and sub-dean of arts at King's College London from 1945 until 1957.

Low's edition of Edward Gibbon's Journal was published in 1929 and he abridged The History of the Decline and Fall of the Roman Empire for publication in 1960. In 1937 his biography of Gibbon was published. In his review in Isis, Ashley Montagu said it was "at once a work of art and of critical scholarship", and that Low possessed "a beautifully efficient, remarkably fine, and economic style". David P. Jordan of the University of Illinois said in 1971 that it was the "standard modern biography, thoroughly admirable".

He edited a selection of Norman Douglas' writings in 1955. After his death, The Times said Low's "conversation was reminiscent of the most humane aspects of the world of South Wind, a blend of wisdom, humour and wit, with no trace of satire".

== Works ==
- Gibbon's Journal to January 28th. 1763, ed. D. M. Low (London: Chatto & Windus, 1929)
- Edward Gibbon, 1737–1794 (London: Chatto & Windus, 1937).
- Norman Douglas: A Selection from the Works, ed. D. M. Low (London: Chatto & Windus, 1955).
- The Decline and Fall of the Roman Empire: An Abridgement, ed. D. M. Low (London: Chatto & Windus, 1960).
