= Eugenio Tanzi =

Italian psychiatrist

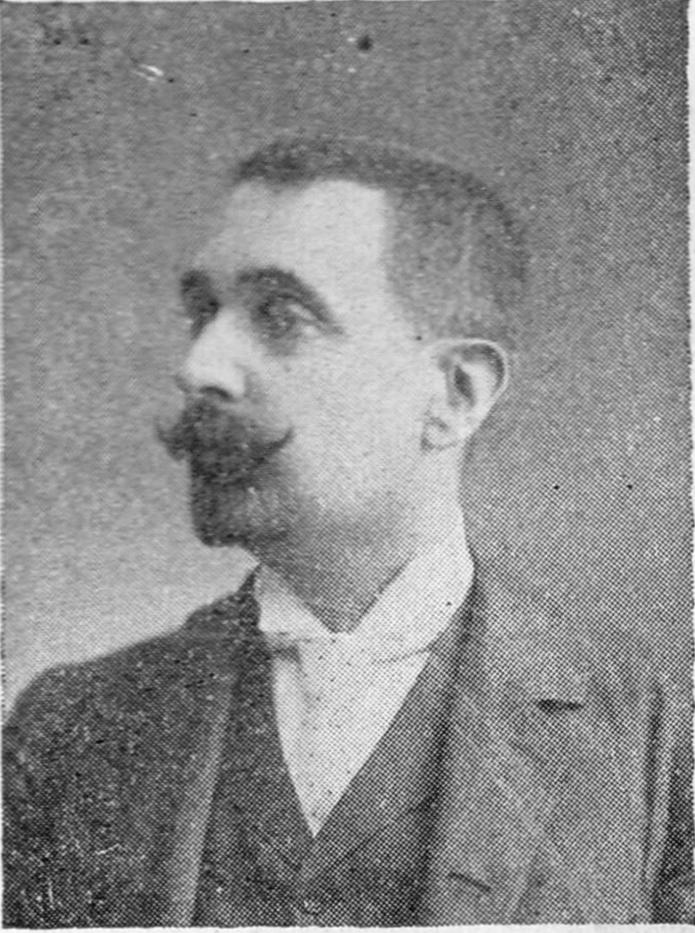
Eugenio Tanzi

Eugenio Tanzi (26 January 1856 – 18 January 1934) was one of the most influential Italian psychiatrists in the late 19th and early 20th centuries.

== Life ==
Born in Trieste, then part of the Austrian Empire, he studied medicine at the University of Padua then at the University of Graz. His Italian nationalism prevented him working in medicine in Trieste and so he instead began his psychiatric training in Reggio Emilia under the guidance of the Bolognese neurologist and psychiatrist Augusto Tamburini, whose school united organisational and scientific skills. Tanzi conformed to this school, taking a biological approach to psychiatry.

In 1893 he became professor of psychiatry at the University of Cagliari and two years later professor of psychiatry at the University of Florence, where he remained for the rest of his career and where he conducted a series of experiments on neurology and neuropsychology. Whilst in Florence he also became one of the first in Europe to support Santiago Ramón y Cajal's neuron theory, destined to play a fundamental role in the development of neuroscience., and became superintendent of the San Salvi asylum.

In 1896 Tanzi, Tamburini and Enrico Morselli founded the Rivista di Patologia Nervosa e Mentale (RPNM), one of the first Italian reviews on neuropsychiatry. Tanzi's own best-known works include a co-study with Riva on paranoia (1884), whilst he co-published the two-volume Trattato delle malattie mentali (Treatise on Mental Maladies) with his former student Ernesto Lugaro in 1904, with the latter remaining a central text for Italian psychiatry until the late 1920s and a long-term influence on psychopathology and psychiatric clinics.

In 1907 he became secretary-general of the Società Italiana di Neurologia and was initiated into the 'Universo' Masonic Lodge in Rome. In 1929 Tanzi, Charles Scott Sherrington and Ivan Pavlov were made honorary members of the British Royal College of Psychiatry. He died in Salò days before his seventieth birthday.

== Works ==
- La paranoia. Contributo alla teoria delle degenerazioni psichiche, con Gaetano Riva, Reggio Emilia, Tipografia di Stefano Calderini e figlio, 1886.
- I neologismi degli alienati in rapporto col delirio cronico, Reggio Emilia, Tipografia di Stefano Calderini e figlio, 1889.
- I progressi della psichiatria, Un nuovo capitolo della chirurgia cerebrale. Rivista sintetica, Firenze, Le Monnier, 1891.
- I fatti e le induzioni nell'odierna istologia del sistema nervoso. Rassegna critica, Reggio Emilia, Tipografia di Stefano Calderini e figlio, 1893.
- Il misticismo nelle religioni, nell'arte e nella pazzia, Firenze, : Tipografia Cooperativa, 1899.
- Una teoria dell'allucinazione, Firenze, Società Tipografica Fiorentina, 1901.
- La legge sui manicomi e sugli alienati, Bologna, Zamorani e Albertazzi, 1903.
- Trattato delle malattie mentali, Fasc. 1–8, Milano, Società Editrice Libraria, 1904.
- Trattato delle malattie mentali, Fasc. 9–20 (fine), Milano, Società Editrice Libraria, 1904.
- Psichiatria forense, Milano, Vallardi, 1911.
- Il caso giudiziario di Tullio Murri. Considerazioni generali e parere psichiatrico, Bologna, Tipografia Succ. Monti e Noè, 1915.

== Bibliography ==
- (in Italian) Vittorio Challiol, Tanzi, Eugenio Enciclopedia Italiana (1937), Istituto dell'Enciclopedia italiana Treccani
- Berlucchi, G. (2002). The Origin of the Term plasticity in the Neurosciences: Ernesto Lugaro and Chemical Synaptic Transmission. Journal for the History of Neurosciences, Vol. XI, 3, pp. 305–309 (5).
- Glickstein, M. (2006). Golgi and Cajal: The neuron doctrine and the 100th anniversary of the 1906 Nobel Prize. Current Biology, Vol. XVI, 5, pp. 147–151.
- Peccarisi, C., Boeri, R., Salmaggi, A. (1994). Eugenio Tanzi and the beginnings of European Neurology. Journal for the History of Neurosciences, Vol. III, 3, pp. 177–185.
- Salomone, G., Arnone, R., Zanchin, G. (1996). The Società Italiana di Neurologia: origins. The Italian Journal of Neurological Sciences, Vol. XVII, 4, pp. 311–319.
- (in Italian) Tanzi, E. (1898). Sulle modificazione morfologiche funzionali dei dendriti delle cellule nervose. Rivista di Patologia Nervosa e Mentale, 3, pp. 337–359.
