= Witch trials in Sweden =

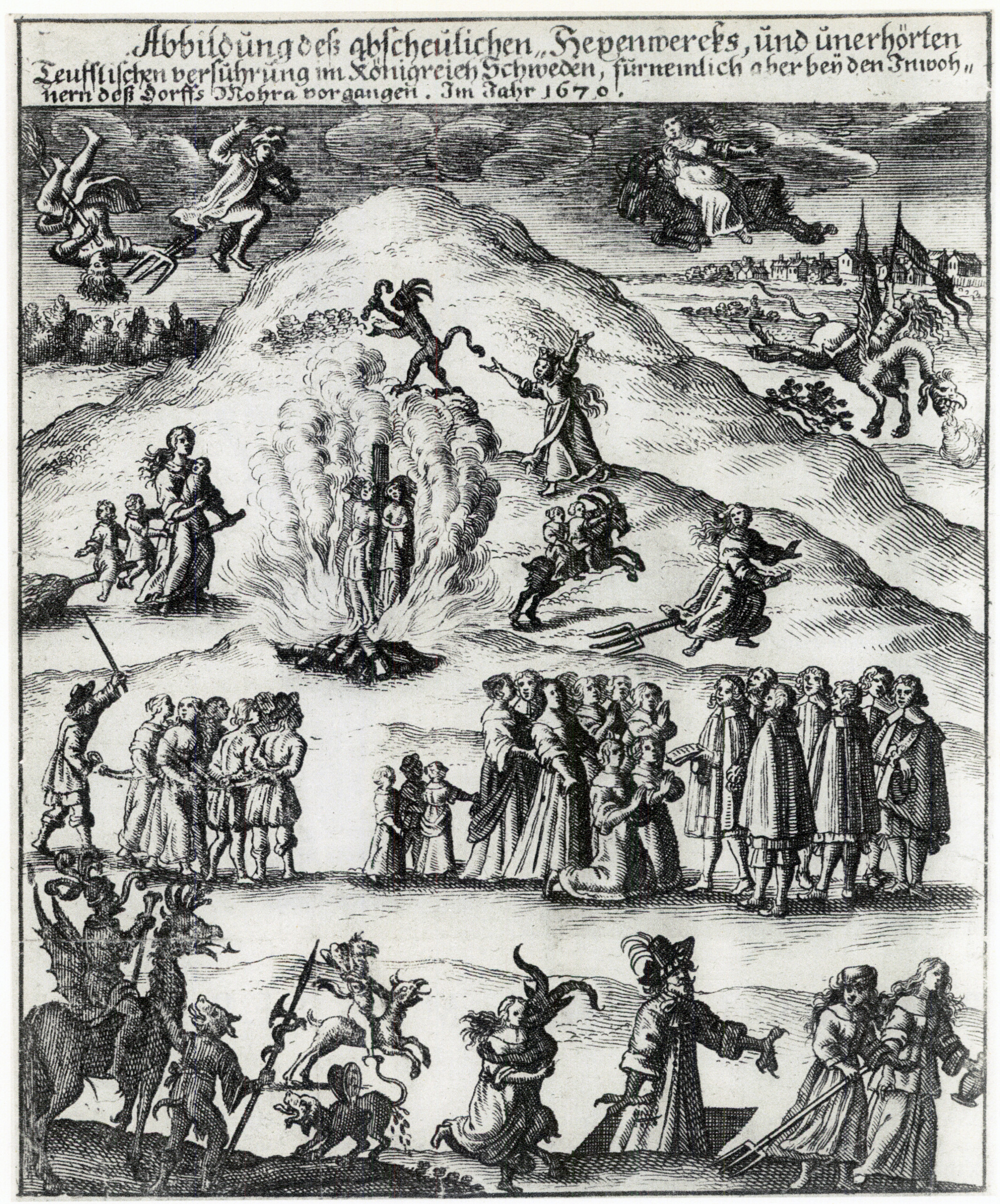
The witch processes in Mora. At the bottom, devils and witches. Above, women and children are being interrogated and are given testimony. A prisoner drives a flock of imprisoned witches and wizards. Around the bonfire where the convicted burn, witches are seen carrying children on brooms, goats and debris, while demons in animal debris tumble into the air. German copper engraving from 1670.

Sweden was a country with few witch trials compared to other countries in Europe. In Sweden, about four hundred people were executed for witchcraft prior to the last case in 1704. Most of these cases (circa 280) occurred during a short but intense period; the eight years between 1668 and 1676, when the witch hysteria called Det stora oväsendet ('The Great Noise' or 'The Great Unrest') took place, causing a large number of witch trials in the country. It is this infamous period of intensive witch hunt that is most well known and explored.

== The first wave: Swedish witch trials before 1668 ==
In the Middle Ages, sorcery was not considered a serious crime. Sorcery was criminalized in Sweden (with Finland) in the County Law of 1350, which stated death penalty for sorcery only if it had been combined with murder (maleficium), but there are no confirmed case that anyone was actually executed for sorcery in Sweden during the Middle Ages.

There are a few sorcery cases where the outcome is unknown (but was probably fines), such as a case from Arboga city's notebook in 1471, when Karin and Birgitta Andersdotter were accused of witchcraft. Another one, the case of Eric Clauesson from 1492, who was executed for consorting with the Pagan god Odin (viewed by the Christian church as a demon), could be categorized as a witch trial, but also as a heresy trial.

This law was valid until 1608.

=== Until 1608 ===
In the 16th century, the law was beginning to be interpreted more strictly. During the period from the Swedish Reformation in 1527 to 1596, there were about 100 witch trials in Sweden, which may have resulted in ten deaths in total. These trials mainly took place in Småland and Götaland.

In 1550, Lasses Birgitta of Öland became the first woman in Sweden confirmed to have been executed for witchcraft. In 1551, king Gustav Vasa ordered those suspected of the murder of his secretary Clemens Hansson by use of poison and sorcery to be arrested, prosecuted, imprisoned and tortured, but it appears his demands were not met. One of these women was offered by the court to swear herself free by a so-called tolvmannaed (literally:"Twelve Men's Oath'). However, the trial did not take place until 1563, when Hansson's heirs brought it to the king's high council. The woman was then offered to go through the previously proposed oath, with the condition that if she could not, she would be sentenced as guilty, this meant she would be sentenced to pay fines "by Sweden's law".

In 1571, the priests of the country were ordered to pay attention to all signs of witchcraft in the communities, and the following year a provision was introduced to exclude those who engaged in witchcraft from the congregation. Several such cases are said to take place in Värmland during this time. In 1575, two women were executed in Fryksdalen, and later in 1607-1610 a series of additional cases were brought up, which was submitted to King Charles IX of Sweden, where torture occurred in several of them.

Bishop Abraham Angermannus' visitation journey through the country in 1596–97, in effect the final stage of the Swedish Reformation, intended to root out anything not in accordance with Protestant practices, resulted in a wave of about 140 witch trials, especially in Götaland; however, they did not result in the death penalty but rather to fines, pillorying, whippings and other disciplinarian punishments.

In 1597, three women in Hälsingland were accused of flying over "mountains and valleys" to Blåkulla where they had intercourse with Satan, which were among the earliest cases were women in Sweden were accused of having attended a witches' Sabbath. Notable cases were those with Brita Pipare and Geske in the capital of Stockholm, which also included descriptions of witchcraft of the kind it was by then becoming the modern one on the continent. However, the old Swedish sorcery law was not made to deal with witchcraft cases in the manner they were performed in the nearby Germany, and death sentences could not be issued in these cases because the law did not allow for death penalty for consorting with the Devil, which illustrate the difficulty for authorities to deal with this new phenomenon.

King Charles IX however, being a Protestant reformer with knowledge of the words of the Bible, where sorcery was condemned by death, was personally in favor of being strict toward sorcery. In 1607, Charles IX condemned a woman to be burned after she was accused of sucking all the power and blood of her son through a magician. The magician was also prosecuted on orders from the king, but there are no known documents to prove how he was prosecuted. It is also the only known accusation of vampirism in the Swedish witch processes.

=== 1608–1668 ===
In 1608, Sweden was given a modern Witchcraft Act. It replaced the old law, where sorcery was only punishable if combined with murder, and introduced the death penalty for all forms of sorcery, based on the Bible's writings: "Thou shalt not suffer a witch to live." This law was the beginning of the real witch hunt in Sweden, and the period of the 1610s did see the first Swedish witch hunt.

In 1611, a woman called Karin of Öckleqvarna was subjected to the water test, by royal command, the result of her prosecution is however lost. The same year, the famous case of Elin i Horsnäs took place, in which the deadly outcome was likely affected by the new laws, as she had been accused but acquitted before. During the 1610s, the first real witch hunt in Sweden resulting in death sentences took place in the Duchy of Östergötland on the order of Princess Maria Elizabeth of Sweden. Lussi from Svarttorp in Hällestad confessed that she had attended the Witche's Sabbath in Blåkulla and had sex with Satan, and seven women were executed in the Finspång witch trial of 1617. There were likely several more who were accused and convicted during the witch hunt of the 1610s, but the number of cases and executions are badly documented as most of the contemporary documentation has been lost. In 1619, two "witches" were imprisoned in Gävle for having intercourse with Satan in Blåkulla.

Other lesser-known early trials where several were convicted at the same time, including those in Ramsele 1634, Norrköping 1617, northern Värmland 1603–07 and Vassunda 1603. Because of the large number of accused people in northern Värmland, it seems to have come close to the same amount of trials as in Östergötland, but because the court ruling is lacking, the consequences of these trials are basically unknown. However, in a preserved document, it is stated that a man named Mats in Olaby was sentenced according to the law of Uppland and Västerås to be burned. In 1633, "Olof Fets' wife" was sentenced to be beheaded and burned in Örebro by Svea Court of Appeal because she confessed that she had been in Blåkulla once and had intercourse with Satan.

The first wave of trials in Sweden, which occurred between the 1590s and 1610s (which was also the most intensive time period in Europe), stopped in the 1620s, and for the following forty years, death penalty for witchcraft was a rare sentence in Sweden. These first witch-trials were few compared to the large hysteria that would come to be in the 1660s and 70s. In 1635 the parliament, whose task it was to confirm the death sentences handed down by the local courts, expressed a relief that there had been very few cases of witch trials reported to them for a period of several years past.

While the witch trials became more common in Sweden in the first half of the 17th century, they seldom resulted in death sentences. Prior to 1668, the most common outcome for someone accused for sorcery in Sweden was for the accused to be released or given a penalty other than death penalty. For example, out of the 14 people (3 men and 11 women) who were charged for sorcery (3 for witchcraft, 7 for harming humans or animals) in the province of Dalarna during 1631–1667, the vast majority received a mild punishment such as banishment or fines. 16 witchcraft trials (5 against men, 11 against women), were held in 1630–1671 according to Frykdal's books of upper district law, most of whom did not result in a death penalty. Indeed, the most serious trial in Dalarna before 1668 is considered to be the case of Håll Karin in 1663, which resulted in banishment from the area instead of death penalty.

Witch trials hardly occurred during Queen Christina's reign. In 1648 the high profiled case of Olof Månsson was commuted from a death sentence to a disciplinarian punishment. In the winter of 1649 the queen ordered the witch trial in the Swedish province of Bremen-Verden in Germany be stopped so it wouldn't develop into a mass trial. However, while rare, the death penalty did occur in witchcraft trials during this time. In 1650, two old women from Umeå had admitted that they had traveled to Blåkulla and used magic tricks to milk other cows and were sentenced to death according to the 1608 law. When the High Court, which gave the sentence for decapitation and later being burned at a bonfire, referred the case to Christina, she approved the death sentence. In 1653, a woman from Lit in Jämtland was also sentenced to death for killing cattle with magic. It is considered the last death sentence for witchcraft in Sweden before 1668. Prior to 1668, a little under a hundred executions for witchcraft are estimated to have occurred in Sweden.

== The "Great Unrest" of 1668–1676 ==
The largest and most famous Swedish witch hunt took off in 1668 during the reign of Charles XI, when the hysteria called Det stora oväsendet (lit. 'the Great Unrest') resulted in almost three hundred executions (more than any period prior), during the eight years until 1676, when they were stopped. They took place mainly on Northern Sweden and in the former Danish province of Bohuslän.

The witch hunt started when Lars Elvius, church pastor in Älvdalen in Dalarna, interrogated the little shepherd girl Gertrud Svensdotter, who pointed out Märet Jonsdotter for having abducted her to the Witches' Sabbath of Satan in Blockula. This expanded in to a large trial in Mora in Dalarna in 1668, where 17 people were sentenced to death for having abducted children to Satan. The children who were supposed victims and witnesses were punished as well, not for having witnessed but of having been to Satan and participated in the Sabbath, albeit by being kidnapped; in Mora, 148 children were sentenced with being whipped or running the gauntlet.

The witch trial of Mora attracted attention and caused a hysteria in the country. The witch hunt of 1668–1676 was endemic to its nature: it spread as rumours by way of mouth from parish to parish rather than being confined to one place. The phenomena of witches abducting children to the Witches' Sabbath of Satan of Blockula (or Blåkulla), where they were exposed to sexual abuse and forced to sell their souls, caused widespread panic among the parents of the nation, and parents of several parishes, alarmed by the rumours among their children, started to demand that the authorities issue investigations in their parishes. In this way, witch trials spread from parish to parish, when more and more parents demanded that their children's stories be investigated.

Eventually, the witch panic spreading around the provinces and the growing number of local witch trials caused the government to form a central national Witchcraft Commission in an attempt to take control of the situation. The rules of the Witchcraft Commission was issued by the king in 1673 and 1674. The 1673 regulation stated that only those accused who confessed willingly and who had played a leading role were legal to execute. The revised rules of 1674 stated that people could be executed even if they had not confessed, but that torture was, from that point on, legal to use to make them confess (torture had been commonly used before but without legal permission). The commission was divided into two departments under the supervision of Governor Carl Larsson Sparre, who preserved to right to confirm all sentences before they could legally be carried out. All the condemned were executed by decapitation, after which their remains were burned at the stake.

The worst phase occurred in 1675, when about 110 were executed in Ångermanland and Gästrikland. In the Torsåker witch trials in Ångermanland, 71 people; of which 65 women (every fifth woman in Torsåkers parish), 2 men and 4 boys, were beheaded and then burned on the stake on June 1, 1675. According to some sources, 9 people were executed already on March 28 and the remaining 62 on June 1, 1675, on a mountain in the border area between Torsåkers, Dals and Ytterlännäs parishes. In June 1675 the hysteria reached the capital of Stockholm in the form of the migrating child witness Gävle Boy, who arrived to the capital from the provincial town of Gävle after having testified in his own mothers witch trial. Eight women were executed during the Katarina witch trials in the Katarina Parish in Stockholm in 1676: Anna Sippel, Britta Sippel, Anna Måndotter, Anna Persdotter Lärka, Maria Jöransdotter, Margareta Matsdotter, Anna Simonsdotter Hack and Malin Matsdotter, the last one of whom was, uniquely, burned alive.

The witch trials of the Katarina Parish in Stockholm were, however, to be the end of the whole Swedish witch hunt. During the proceedings in Stockholm, several members of the Witchcraft Commission, notably Eric Noraeus and Urban Hiärne, had a growing concern over the rights of those accused and the testimonies used to condemn them, particularly as the testimonies were given by children who were merely asked to confirm their former statement rather than to repeat them. On 11 September 1676, one of the child witnesses admitted to have lied in court. This confession was followed by the complete breakdown of all the child witnesses before court, who admitted to having lied and who were instead charged with perjury. As a consequence, the Witchcraft Commission immediately order a stop of the witch hunt nationwide, and started to issue investigation in how the witch hysteria could be effectively stopped.

In 1677, the Witchcraft Commission and the government ordered the clergy nationwide to stop all witch panic by conducting a prayer of gratitude in their pulpits, thanking God that the witches had now been banned forever from the Kingdom. When some of the clergymen protested and insisted that the witches had indeed been guilty and the sorcery real, they were lectured by the Witchcraft Commission and forced to comply. By that act, the great witch hunt known as the Great Noise of 1668-1676 was ended in Sweden and the Witchcraft Commission was dissolved.

== The end ==
While the Witchcraft Act of 1608 was still legally in force, the Svea Court of Appeal was reluctant to confirm death sentences for witchcraft reported to them by local courts after 1676. While witchcraft cases occasionally appeared in the late 17th and early 18th century, they were few and isolated, and guilty verdicts of local courts were normally commuted to lesser punishment or repealed altogether by the high courts.

The death sentences of a witch trial in Vendel in 1687 were all repealed by the Svea Court of Appeal, and the witch trials of Malung in 1708 and Leksand in 1714 both ended in acquittals. In 1711 a Baron Lütsow, and in 1718 the Uppsala student Daniel Salthenius were both sentenced to death for having made a Deal with the Devil, but in both cases the sentenced was commuted to imprisonment.

It is dubious whether the 1693 trial against the Sami shaman Lars Nilsson should be categorized as a witch trial. Similar to Eric Clauesson two centuries prior, he was in actuality executed for Paganism or idolatry, having worshipped a Pagan god. However, the Christian church regarded Pagan gods to be demons and worshipping them to be Satanism, which enabled an execution by use of the still existing witchcraft act. While the witchcraft act was used to enable these executions, they were in fact rather a part of the persecutions of idolatry during the Christianization of the Sámi people.

On 15 June 1704, Anna Eriksdotter was decapitated as the last person executed for witchcraft in Sweden. In 1724, the Södra Ny witch trial of Värmland resulted in several people sentenced guilty of witchcraft, including "Captain Elin", but they were not executed. This witch trial was first handled by the local court. When the high court was made aware of it, they took control over it in order to stop it. They restricted themselves to sentence only those who had themselves confessed. The court referred to them as fools, who confessed themselves guilty because of "insane dreams" influenced by stories about the Great Noise fifty years prior, and sentenced them to be whipped and banished from their parish.

The last witch trial in Sweden took place in Åhl in Dalarna in 1757, where several people were subjected to torture and forced to confess. This trial was conducted by the local church with the approval of the local governor. However, while formally legal, as the Witchcraft Act had never been abolished, witch trials were in practice considered a defunct phenomena in Sweden by this point. When countess Cathérine Charlotte De la Gardie, who visited the province of the witch trial, informed the authorities in the capital that a witch trial was taking place in the province, the central authorities immediately ordered the trial to be stopped, and the accused were freed and given monetary compensation for the torture they had been forced to endure.

In 1779, the death penalty for witchcraft was finally abolished.
