= Brita Zippel =

Swedish alleged witch and victim of the Katarina witch trials (died 1676)

Brita Zippel, also called Britta Sippel (died 29 April 1676) was an alleged Swedish witch, known as "Näslösan", one of the victims of the Katarina witch trials during the great witch hunt known as "Det Stora oväsendet" ("The Great noise") in Sweden between 1668-1676 alongside her sister Anna Zippel.

== Background ==
Brita Zippel was born into a wealthy family. Her father, who was of German descent and a master of ball sports, founded "Lilla Bollhuset", a building for sports for the upper classes. Her two brothers were sports instructors for the gentlemen of the court and the king, Charles XI.

In 1669, at around 30 years old, she married a brick-master named Galle and had two children with him. Brita had a reputation for being temperamental and having poor self-control. Her husband had been advised not to marry her. Her own sister, Anna, told him her sister was a "wicked woman". He was told that Brita was the kind of person who "put her pies under the pot when she cooked", meaning that she used sorcery. Her husband had a promising career when they married, but after about four years, he suffered terribly from syphilis, which confined him to bed and ruined him financially. By 1675, her husband was insane. He had not been listed in his profession since 1673, and his family lived in poverty.

Brita was called "Näslösan" (Noseless), because her husband's disease made him lose his nose. She survived mostly on the charity of her sister, Anna Zippel. Her brothers, the sports instructors of the court, no longer acknowledged either sister because of an argument over an inheritance. Her children were left to beg in the streets. Her lack of self-control caused many arguments, leading neighbors to shun her. Her former membership in a different social class alone would have been cause for suspicion.

Brita Zippel was tried for sorcery three times: in 1668, in 1674, and in 1675. In 1668 the master mariner Cornelius accused her of having cursed his ship, and having Satan throw him off his horse three times. She was acquitted, as he could present no proof and her reputation was yet not so bad. The court fined Cornelius for slander. In 1674, a girl accused her of sorcery, but the court again set her free, as they considered the witness insane. By this time, the period of the Swedish witch trials had begun after the accusation of Märet Jonsdotter. In 1670, churches began to use the "witch-prayer", and in 1675, the real witch frenzy arrived in Stockholm. Brita was naturally the first woman to be talked about as a witch.

== Trial ==
Inspired by the Gävle-Boy, Johan Johansson Griis, some children claimed they had been abducted and taken to Witches' Sabbath of Satan in Blockula by witches, making their parents hysterical. Watch-houses were set up to protect children, and Brita's name became the one most mentioned, together with her sister and her sister's friend Anna Månsdotter. The children claimed the two sisters and Månsdotter attacked them in the watch-houses by night. The parents ran in the directions the children pointed and chopped at the walls with axes in search for the attacking witches. One parent produced hairs—later displayed in court—which he claimed he had cut from Brita. The parents appealed to the authorities, who set up a special witch commission to investigate. Brita reacted to the rumors with rage. She hunted the rumor-spreading children in the streets, slapping them and telling them to go to hell. This did not help her cause.

The commission brought in the children of Brita Zippel and her sister Anna to be questioned. In front of their mothers, they said their mother and aunt often took them to Satan. Brita Zippel reacted by attacking her sister in a rage.

The rumors about Brita Zippel increased. The commission repeatedly brought her in for questioning. When a ship burned in the harbor, people blamed her for the loss of life. Rumors said she visited the gallows at night to steal clothes of the hanged. Children claimed they had seen her playing dice with her sister in Blockula to decide which of them would set fire to the royal palace, and Brita won. When she stayed at home from one of the questionings, the children claimed she was tired after having been whipped by the Devil. When the authorities examined her, they saw a spot on her back. A doctor later examined her and confirmed that she had the fever and that he could not find any mark, but the damage had been done.

Brita Zippel did not defend herself against her children's testimony. Though hostile towards other people, she was very fond of her children, and never blamed them for their accusations. Also, her children more often mentioned their aunt Anna than their mother. They claimed their aunt took them to Satan when their mother was unable, and had to be pressed to confirm the above accusations of their mother. The court pressed Brita's daughter Annika to confirm the accusations that she saw her mother light the ship on fire. She gave her testimony so unwillingly that she tried to accuse the court-member, Frank, and the mayor, Thegnér, of sorcery. When Brita asked her daughter Annika why she had never said anything of this to her, she answered that her aunt had threatened her. Brita then attacked her sister. She also told her daughter that she would gladly die for her. When she was taken to prison, she said: "Now I know what hardship it is to be a parent! I am a terrible sinner, but never have I used sorcery!"

During the trial, she could not control her rage at the accusations. Unlike her sister Anna, famous for a proud and verbal defense, and Anna Månsdotter, who damaged her case by maintaining her dignity, Brita provoked the court. She cursed witnesses, and brought a knife to court when a woman she had quarreled with came to testify. When asked why she carried a knife in her muff, she answered that she would rather be executed guilty of murder than innocently of sorcery.

She admitted she had sinned against the commandments of the bible by working on holidays because of her poverty. The previous cases against her, in 1668 and 1674, were taken up again. The Gävle-boy was taken from prison to confront her.

The court convicted Brita Zippel, her sister Anna, and Anna Månsdotter on the 24th of April, sentencing them to death. They sentenced her with the words: "Brita Zippel can not be acquitted, but shall be decapitated and her body shall well deservedly be burned at the stake for others as warning, and justly so."

== Execution ==
The execution took place in the square of Hötorget, in the city of Stockholm on 29 April 1676. The three condemned women behaved differently. Anna Månsdotter committed suicide before the execution, though her body was still publicly decapitated and burned. Anna Zippel was passive and numb. Brita Zippel, however, did not go to her execution quietly.

All the way to the execution, she shook her shackles, and mocked the audience. She cursed everyone from the Royal House and the judges to the prison guards, the audience, and anyone who had come to watch her execution. She told them all to watch themselves—was she not a witch? Even if the executioner cut off her head and burned her skull and corpse on a stake, she would come back to have her vengeance on them all. If they thought she was afraid, they were sadly mistaken; Satan himself had made her insensitive to all pain. They could do what ever they pleased, burn her, cut her body to pieces, and she would feel nothing, but doubt not that she would have her vengeance—by the aid of Satan. The priest, a member of the witch commission, tried to get her to repent and take communion, but she refused. If truly a witch, she would keep on being so. She would return as a ghost devil of Satan to torment the congregation of Katarina, and she would take on the priest first.

She demanded a drink, which, under an old custom, was a right of the condemned. One of the executioner's helpers rushed forward with a bottle. She took it and drank, and would have finished the whole bottle if the executioner had not signaled, 'enough!' They took the bottle away by force, so the executioner could have his share.

Then, she and her sister were taken up to the platform. The executioner asked his helpers to take her first for the sake of order, as her sister was quiet and passive. He told them to hold her firmly, to preserve his reputation. She kicked and screamed about vengeance, and cursed and fought every step of the way. It finally took four men just to get her up to the platform. On the platform, three men sat on her to hold her down, a fourth pulled her hair to expose her neck, and a fifth struggled to press her head down to get her neck in place. The executioner aimed and struck. The audience cheered at a perfect strike as her head fell to the ground. Her sister was quickly dealt with, and then the corpse of Anna Månsdotter was decapitated. The three heads and bodies were nailed onto ladders and dropped onto the stakes.

The same day Brita was executed, her daughter Annika had gone to the priest and said to him that she had lied, that her mother was not a witch and that she should not be executed, but the priest had told her to be quiet. After the witch-trials were declared false following the investigations of Urban Hjärne and Eric Noraeus, the witnesses were tried for perjury. Annika was whipped, and she died at Christmas 1676, possibly of the whipping, at the age of fifteen.

== See also ==
- Elin i Horsnäs
- Ramsele witch trial
- Märet Jonsdotter
- Malin Matsdotter
