= Anna Zippel =

Swedish woman executed for witchcraft

Anna Zippel, also spelled as Sippel or Sippela (died 29 April 1676), was an alleged Swedish witch, one of the most famous ones of the Katarina witch trials in Stockholm during the Swedish witch mania "Det stora Oväsendet" ("The Great Noise") of 1668–1676; She was called "The Queen of Blockula", and together with her sister Brita Zippel the most famous witch in Swedish history, famed for her proud defense.

Together with her sister, Brita Zippel, and her friend and business partner Anna Månsdotter, she was the first woman in Stockholm to be accused of abducting children to Witches' Sabbath of Satan in Blockula.

== Background ==
Anna Zippel was a wealthy middle-class woman. Her brothers were sports instructors at the royal court, and her husband Bengt Bråk owned several bakeries, properties, and a mill. She sold medicines made by her close friend, the independent and attractive hatmaker, Anna Månsdotter. She supported her impoverished sister Brita Zippel, even though they were not close. Unlike her sister Brita Zippel, she was a respected and dignified woman. She had a place in high society and, according to witnesses, was on friendly terms with the mayor Thegnérs wife, the wife of the city-captain, Margareta Remmer, and madame de la Vallée, wife of the famed architect Jean de la Vallée of the Royal house. Aware that accusations of sorcery were not accepted against members of the upper-classes, Anna would later state this in the trial against her.

Anna was described as a tall, proud woman with elegant posture, and she seems to have been interested in fashion. The children described her as the "Queen of Blåkulla", dressed in expensive clothing, in diamonds, a train, and with her hair in curls. Teenage girls claimed she had dressed them for marriage to the Devil in Hell. It is possible she was accused because of her sister and her friend. Her sister, Brita, had been accused of sorcery twice before, and her friend, Anna Månsdotter was called "Vipp-upp-med-näsan" ("Up-with-the-nose") because of her provocative confidence, disregard of gossip and public opinion, and her business selling medicines to wealthy people. Anna Månsdotter also had taught Anna Zippel's daughters to sew.

== Accused ==
A child pointed her out in the street, screaming "She was the one who took me to the Devil!" before fainting. People claimed her medicine was really magical potions. Her former maid came forth with a litany of claims: Zippel sent her on mysterious missions in the middle of the night, Zippel met with Anna Månsdotter in her room in the night, the Devil filled Zippel's basement with money regularly, the ghost of a dog guarded her garden, and she bathed every time she made medicine. The maid also accused Zippel of asking for the first blood of her menstruation, telling her to smear her body with it and use it to write a name on her forehead. The maid also claimed she had been sick for three years after leaving Zippel's employment. Anna Zippel's husband was also accused to have abducted children to Blåkulla.

When the children of her sister and herself were questioned, they claimed she had taken them to the Sabbath of Satan. Her sister's children were even more eager to point at her than at their mother, saying that she took them to the Devil when their mother was indisposed. Zippel's friend, Anna Månsdotter, was also accused of abducting children, and of scraping the gold of the church bells on her way to Blåkulla. Anna Zippel was considered a very powerful witch. When she was taken to jail, she spat at a man who shouted at her and he fell dead. A caretaker at the jail who looked her in the face died as well.

== Trial ==
Anna Zippel behaved with great dignity during the trial, defending herself with fearlessness and confidence. Fifty witnesses testified against her. She stated that she and her husband had made their wealth with hard work and companionship, and that she and her friend Anna Månsdotter had great skill in making medicine. She said she was proud of the way she treated her children and her servants, and that people had come with these allegations because of jealousy. She said it did not matter how many people testified against her—she was still innocent—and even if all the priests and bishops in the kingdom testified against her, it would not change that fact.

She refused all accusations made against her, her sister, and her friend, calling them accusations made of evil and aggression. When the three women were sentenced to be decapitated and burned at the stake, she replied, "Well! I am still innocent! God forgive you for the verdict you just made!"

== Execution ==
During the execution, Anna seemed to have lost all will to fight. Unlike her sister, Brita Zippel, who fought every step of the way and drew a lot of attention when brought forward, Anna was described as completely numb, as if unaware of what happened. She was taken last. She said nothing, did not listen to the priests and did not even move. The executioner's helpers led her up to the platform as if she were a doll. On the platform, her head was cut off, her corpse was nailed to a ladder, and the ladder dropped on the stake.

== See also ==
- Märet Jonsdotter
- Elin i Horsnäs
- Gävle-Boy
- Malin Matsdotter
