= Ramsele witch trial =

- Part of Early Swedish witch trials
- Date: 1634
- Location: Ramsele in Ångermanland in Norrland in Sweden
- Type: Witch trial
- Cause: Accusations of sorcery and milk theft
- Participants: Local court authorities
- Outcome: One man and four women executed
- Accused: One man and several women

The Ramsele witch trial, which took place in 1634, is one of the few known Swedish witch trials before the great witch mania of 1668–1676.

== Background ==
In the year of 1634 a man and several women were put on trial in the city of Ramsele in Ångermanland in Norrland in Sweden. This was during a period of starvation, and they were accused of having stolen milk from their neighbors.

The man was said to have stabbed a knife in a wall and, uttering "terrible prayers," milked the wall through the knife. It had been claimed that the women had used small animals, hares and undefined creatures to milk cattle in their neighbor's barns. The women were pointed out by Barbro Påvelsdotter from Sandviken, who was the first to be arrested, and confirmed to have been with her to Blockula.

Unfortunately, few records exist about this trial. In 1635, the vicar, Mr Elias, complained about the economic loss he had suffered because of the witches spells, and in 1636, the executioner Håkan of Säbrå received payment for "Having burned one warlock and four witches". It is most likely that they were beheaded before they were burned, as no known witch in Sweden, with the exception of Malin Matsdotter, was burned alive.

The real witch-hunt came to Sweden late, and didn't break out until 1668. It then reached its peak with the Torsåker witch trials. Witch trials were known in Sweden before 1668, but they were few and often ended with an acquittal or a mild sentence, not execution, such as the case of Brita Pipare Stockholm in 1593. This is one of the few known examples of a "mass trial" of sorcery in Sweden before the great witch hunt in the 1670s; before 1668, there are few examples in Sweden of witch trials where more than two people were executed at the same time. Another example is the Finspång witch trial in 1617, where seven women were executed.

== See also ==
- Elin i Horsnäs
- Märet Jonsdotter
