= Elsa Thomasdotter =

Swedish folk healer

Elsa Thomasdotter, known as "Lilla Guden" ("[The] Little God"), was a Swedish cunning woman or folk healer. She was one of the people accused of witchcraft in the Katarina witch trials during the witch hunt known as the Great noise, which took place in Sweden in 1668–1676.

== Early life ==
Elsa Thomasdotter was born in Finland (then a Swedish province) and emigrated to Stockholm as young, where she worked as a maidservant to the noblewoman Helena Fleming (1581–1654) at Östanå Castle. Her age and year of birth is unknown. When she was put on trial in 1676, she was old and blind, and stated before court that she was 99 years old and had been working as a folk healer for 91 years, which was accepted by the court on the assumption that she was simply unable to count.

During a period of many years, she was a successful and respected folk healer in Stockholm, where Finnish people were often successful in this profession because of the common prejudice that Finnish people could master magic. She was known for her herbal medicines, and respectfully referred to as "Lilla Guden" ("[The] Little God").

== Trial ==
In 1676, the Katarina witch trials took place. In April 1676, Brita Sippel was executed for sorcery, and her husband, the mason Jöran Nilsson Galle, was also arrested and imprisoned on charge of sorcery. Galle and his daughter Annika pointed out three folk healers: Helena Olofsdotter, Elsa Thomasdotter and Erik Eriksson, who had treated Galle as physicians on occasion, for witchcraft. They were duly arrested and charged with sorcery in July.

However, the trial against them posed a problem for the Witchcraft Commission. While folk healers were often reported to the authorities because they customarily used spells including the name of God in their treatments, they were normally given light sentences by the judges, who customarily preferred to charge them with superstition rather than witchcraft. The court had assembled to investigate the alleged abduction of children by witches to the witches' sabbath of Satan in Blockula, which was the purpose of the Katarina witch trials, and the accusation against the folk healers for sorcery did not fit the narrative of the rest of the trials. Despite the intense witch hunt going on when the three folk healers were put on trial, no witness stepped forward to accuse them of having abducted children to the witches' sabbath, or of having done anything but good with their spells.

When Elsa Thomasdotter was put on trial, she was reportedly unable to speak Swedish, and an interpreter was appointed to her. Her interpreter were the vicar of the Finnish church. Elsa Thomasdotter was described as confident and acted without any fear before the court. She firmly denied any sort of contact with Satan. She stated that she had originally learned to manufacture herbal medicines by Helena Fleming when she was in her employ, not by Satan. When she became old and blind, she had learned to manufacture a medicine against leg pain, which had become so popular that she had been able to support herself as a folk healer. She offered to show her medicines in court and demonstrate that none of the ingredients were anything but natural. She admitted that she was called "[The] Little God" by grateful patients because she had been abled to cure illnesses when educated doctors had failed, but that this sobriquet was used about her against her will.

She was a popular and respected member of society, and her own parish vicar - who acted as her interpreter - testified in her favor. He knew that she was a folk healer; he was not aware that she used spells which included the name of God in her treatments (as was common for folk healers), but assured the court that she was a pious member of the parish – since she was blind, he regularly visited her in her home for worship service.

== Verdict ==
The Court decided to deal with the three folk healers in accordance with the normal custom when folk healers were accused of sorcery. Elsa Thomasdotter, Helena Olofsdotter and Erik Eriksson admitted to having abused the name of God in their spells during their treatments, stated their regret, asked for mercy and were given a sentence of pillorying, after which they were released.
