= Malin Matsdotter =

Alleged Swedish witch (1613–1676)

Malin Matsdotter or Mattsdotter, also known as Rumpare-Malin (1613 – 5 August 1676) was a Swedish woman accused of being a witch. She is known as one of few people in Sweden confirmed to have been executed by burning for witchcraft, and the only one to be executed by this method during the famous witch hunt Det Stora oväsendet ('The Great Noise') in Sweden during 1668–1676, which ended with her execution.

== Early life ==
According to protocol, Malin Matsdotter was of Finnish heritage: she herself later stated in court protocol that she originally learned her prayers in the Finnish language. She was born in Ostrobothnia in Finland (at the time a part of Sweden) and moved to the capital of Stockholm to work as a maidservant in the 1630s. In 1638 she married Erik Nilsson (1592-1668), who worked in the manufacture of nails and other metal threads, and they had two daughters: Anna Eriksdotter (born 1655) and Maria Eriksdotter (born 1657).

In 1668, her husband was executed for having intercourse with a cow. He had been reported by their 13-year-old daughter Anna, after she and her sister had been brought home after running away to escape being beaten by their father, then by their mother at their father's command. During the beating, Anna reportedly said to her father: "God knows mother beat, and You beat, and I shall no longer remain silent, such a sin You have committed, all the time standing on a chair over our black cow like a rooster over a hen." Malin testified in the trial of her spouse that he had been sleeping with a knife under his pillow and had acted suicidal.

Malin Matsdotter remarried in 1669, this time to Anders Arendtsson. Her daughters left home soon afterward, stating as a reason the frequent arguments between their mother and stepfather. Very little is known about Malin Matsdotter, other than fragments that came forward during her trial, which also amounted to little. Her profession is unknown; she is mentioned to have been active as a midwife at one occasion, but whether that was her regular profession is unknown. Though described as poor, in 1676, she owned her own house in Mariaberget in Stockholm, and she had been hired as a midwife by Anna Zippel (also accused in the same witch trial), but there is no information that she was a professional midwife, and she is not referred to as such in the court protocols. Her house included a sauna, which was a common way for people to clean themselves in this time period, and it is known that she earned a small income by renting out her sauna. In court protocol she is referred to by the sobriquet "Rumpare Malin"; the meaning "Rumpare" is unknown, but it is similar to the term "Rumpoxe", which was a contemporary pejorative used for "stupid"/uneducated people.

Since 1668, a national witch hunt raged through Sweden since the accusation of Märet Jonsdotter by Gertrud Svensdotter in Dalarna, resulting in the establishment of witch commissions around the nation and execution of about 280 people, accused of abducting children to the Witches' Sabbath of Satan in Blockula and often judged upon the testimonies of children. The Swedish witch frenzy reached its peak with the Torsåker witch trials in 1675, and reached the capital of Stockholm the same year with the Gävle-Boy, which led to a witch trial in the congregation of Katarina Church, known as the Katarina witch trials, were children and teenagers of the Katarina Parish started to follow the example of the Gävle Boy by pointing out women for abducting them to Satan. By May 1676, the Katarina witch trial had resulted in the execution of the sisters Brita and Anna Zippel, Maria Jönsdotter, Margareta Matsdotter and Anna Persdotter Lärka, as well as death in prison by suicide of Anna Månsdotter and Karin Johansdotter.

== Trial ==
In July 1676, Malin Matsdotter was reported for witchcraft by her nineteen-year-old daughter Maria Eriksdotter. Her reported stated:

The true daughter of Rumpare Malin, Maria Eriksdotter age nineteen, were called upon and confessed that she had the same night been abducted by Anna Wife of Staffan, who sells beer at Dalarö, to whom she had been lost at games by her mother [...] Last Easter Evening her mother allegedly said to her: My daughter do you wish to follow me and we will make people out of you [...] thereafter she began to take her every night [to Blockula] [...] the second time [she travelled to Blockula] upon a man. Confessed aside that her mother had always had a bad language, cursed and used ugly words, particularly on great holy days.

Malin Matsdotter was questioned and interrogated to tell the truth. She was thoroughly questioned regarding her religious instruction. When asked to recite the Creed, she answered that she could not bother to read and barely knew the Lord's Prayer. Her language difficulties attracted attention when she had difficulty reading the prayers the court instructed her to: she did not know them herself, and even had trouble repeating them when they were read to her. The court noted that she hesitated in a suspicious way when she was to repeat the prayers word by word. The fact that she had trouble reading was in fact uncommon in 17th-century Stockholm: since the Swedish Church Ordinance 1571, every citizen regardless of class or sex was by law required to be able to read, so that they may be able to read the bible. The fact that she seems to have preferred Finnish was not considered strange by the court, as the capital had a great Finnish minority from the nearby province who even had their own congregation; however, what was regarded suspicious for a person accused of consorting with the Devil was, rather, the fact that she had difficulty to read and pronounce words from the holy scripture.

Her daughter Maria Eriksdotter testified that Malin took her and several other children to Satan in Blockula, and that Satan himself, "The Mean One" appeared in court, long, black and with horns, standing by her mother, holding her skirt and whispered in her ear never to confess. Malin was ordered by the court to fall on her knees and pray to be able to confess, and after having obeyed, her daughter stated that she could no longer see the Devil.

10-year-old Matthias Wallendorph and seven-year-old Margreta Jöransdotter both testified to having been abducted by Malin to Blockula, and they supported Maria Eriksdotter in her words that Satan appeared behind Malin and cautioned her not to confess. The married woman Gertrud Mattsdotter testified that Malin had abducted her children to Satan 16 times before losing them in a game to another woman accused of sorcery, Anna Simonsdotter Hack, called Tysk-Annika ('German-Annika'), and that Malin had abducted them 14 times while in prison. The children of Gertrud Mattsdotter testified that they had been beaten by Malin to prevent them from testifying, and Gertrud Mattsdotter testified that she had seen her children endure fits while being supernaturally beaten by Malin from prison, and that she would rather see them die than suffer, and that she would kill Malin herself if she was not executed. Gertrud Mattsdotter's daughter Annika asked Malin if she had not played with Tysk-Annika about who was going to set fire to Count Per's palace, but Malin refused to confirm this. Malin's older daughter Anna Eriksdotter supported her sister's testimony that their mother took them to Satan, but when she stated that she herself had started to abduct children herself, she was also placed under arrest. The court did ask Maria Eriksdotter if she was trying to have her mother executed in order to inherit her house, but she denied it. Malin's husband is not mentioned much during the trial and was never called to testify.

Malin Matsdotter was asked by the court to fall upon her knees and repeat a prayer read to her, but she did not succeed before her 11th attempt, which was given great importance by the court. She had at one point been hired as a midwife by Anna Zippel, who had previously been executed for witchcraft, and she commented that if she had ever taken anyone to Blockula, which she denied, then in that case, she would have learned it from Anna Zippel.

The court was convinced of her guilt by the testimony of her own daughters combined with her lack of religious knowledge and difficulty to read prayers. She commented the testimony of her daughters with the words: "My God, let them go there [Blockula] for ever", and stated that she did not mind dying when her own daughters testified against her. Her daughters were questioned again and stood by their testimonies, as Malin stood by her denial. Such firm denial was often regarded as a sign that the Devil assisted the witch to withstand interrogations. She accused her daughters of a bad lifestyle, and when the court asked her to specify, she answered with such language that her answer was in fact never written down in the court protocols, because they were "offensive to decent ears". She did state that her daughters had committed theft and that they had barely made an attempt to work and support themselves as maidservants before they had gotten bored and returned to her and expected to be supported by her again.

== Execution ==
On 16 July 1676, Malin Matsdotter was judged guilty as charged by a unanimous court on the testimonies of her daughters and sentenced to be executed. The method of execution was the subject of debate in the royal witchcraft commission, who was to decide between three alternatives; the first was the customary execution by decapitation followed by public burning of the corpse; the second was that she would be subjected to torture prior to the first alternative; and the third alternative was that she would be executed by being burned alive. The last alternative was given the majority vote. The clerical commissioner Carolinus stated in his vote that the honor of God should be regarded before the personal pain of Malin and that she should be given a taste of what was awaiting her in Hell after having seduced so many souls to Satan; commissioners Ivar and Noreus motivated their vote by the deterring effect such a method would have upon the public and her accomplices, and commissioner doctor Urban Hjärne suggested that she be tortured with hot iron prior to the execution, which would make her unconscious and unable to feel pain, because her death would otherwise be too cruel, but the suggestion was revoked with the view, expressed by a priest, that the honour of the name of God was more important than Malin's personal experience of pain; the method was also deemed necessary as an example to the public and to her accomplices. She was instead to have a bag of gunpowder secured around her neck to make her death quicker. Because the court was convinced of her guilt, her refusal to admit guilt made her position worse on the eyes of the court. One suggestion was, that at the place of execution, she would be given a last chance to confess her sin; if she did so, she would be decapitated before she was burned.

The method of execution make the case of Malin Matsdotter unique in Sweden. She was the only person of the almost 300 people executed during the great Swedish witch hunt of 1668–76, to be executed by being burned alive instead of by decapitation followed by public burning of the corpse, which was the normal execution for sorcery in Sweden. Though several crimes formally allowed for public burning as method of execution, this actually meant that the condemned be "executed and burned", which meant that they were first executed by decapitation or hanging, after which their corpse was publicly burned: the method of burning someone still alive is only known to have been used in the country a very few times before, and the verdict was therefore controversial. Malin Matsdotter was the last person to be executed by burning in the capital of Stockholm, and the second to last to be executed by burning in Sweden. No other person executed for sorcery in Sweden is confirmed to have been burned alive. Because of this, she has sometimes also been regarded the only one in Sweden to be executed by burning for sorcery altogether. However, though decapitation was the customary method, they were likely at least some cases in the early 17th century where this method may have been used. The method of execution by burning had been debated by the commission in Stockholm previously during the Catharina witch trial of 1675–76 and actually given to an earlier condemned, Anna Lärka, for her refusal to admit guilt, but it was retracted when she finally did so. In the case of Matsdotter, the sentence was to be carried out.

The execution was performed in the square of Hötorget in Stockholm on 5 August 1676. Malin Matsdotter was to be executed alongside Anna "Annika" Simonsdotter Hack, known as "Tysk-Annika", who had also been accused and sentenced to death on the testimony of her own children, but was to be executed the normal way by decapitation before burning. The contrast between the behavior of the two have been noted. Anna Simonsdotter was described as full humility and respect and behaved as was expected by her, and though she did not directly say that she was guilty, she behaved as was expected of her, and "by her remorse, by her psalms, and by falling on her knees and lifting her head and her hands to the sky, confirmed the justice in the verdict and the justice in the world". According to contemporary witnesses, Malin Matsdotter behaved with great dignity and courage during her execution. When asked to take the hand of her daughter to make peace with her before death, she refused. She "did not seem to fear death much, courageously mounting the stake", and even the official execution protocol noted that she "was very tough". She spoke calmly with the executioner, "allowing him to fasten her with iron by her hands and feet", and the bag of gunpowder was placed around her neck to hasten death. She talked back to the priests with her head held high when they pleaded with her to acknowledge her sin, maintaining her innocence. When her daughter cried out and appealed to her to admit her crimes "Malin delivered her daughter in the hands of the Devil and cursed her for eternity". The daughter in question would have been Maria Eriksdotter, as Anna Eriksdotter was herself in arrest as the time. The execution in itself was described:

"But though all of this was both horrifying and pathetic to look upon, those who suffered death did not shed one tear but stood by their standpoint of innocence with an unnatural courage".

Tradition claims that Malin Matsdotter did not scream but died in silence, in accordance with contemporary view that witches felt no pain.

== Aftermath ==
The execution of Malin Matsdotter did in fact signify the end of the Katarina witch trial in Stockholm and the end of the national 1668–76 witch hunt in Sweden. Some of the judges in the commission, notably Urban Hjärne and Eric Noraeus, begun to express skepticism toward the child witnesses and instigate a different interrogation technique against them by asking them to repeat their testimonies rather than to affirm their already given testimonies. This was particularly brought about since the child witnesses had started to accuse people from the upper classes, such as the Captains wife Margareta Staffansdotter Remmer and Maria Sofia De la Gardie. This resulted in the breakdown of one witness, Annika Thomsdotter, in court on 11 September 1676, which snowballed into other witnesses to retract their testimonies and blamed the leading witnesses, the Gävle Boy, Lisbeth Carlsdotter and the Myra Maids to have convinced them to perjure themselves. Seventeen child- and teenage witnesses admitted perjury. This efficiently discontinued the Katarina witch trial. The remaining accused, Margareta Staffansdotter Remmer, Karina Ambjörnsdotter and Margareta Matsdotter Dufva, were freed, and the courts instead prosecuted the witnesses for perjury, leading to both executions and physical punishments.

The leading perjurers, the Gävle Boy, Lisbeth Carlsdotter and the Myra Maids (Annika Hinrichzdotter and Agnis Eskilsdotter), were executed on 20 December 1676. The daughter of Brita Zippel, Annika Zippel, were sentenced to be whipped and died during the punishment. The oldest daughter of Malin Matsdotter, Anna "Annika" Eriksdotter, was herself under arrest after having stated during her testimony against her mother that she had herself begun to follow her example by abducting children to Satan. Imprisoned, she reported that she heard her mother call for her in her dreams, pinch her and ask her to "come as soon as possible" because she had accused her of witch craft. Anna Eriksdotter was, as the other remaining accused, freed from the charge of witch craft, but sentenced to be whipped for perjury. During the whipping, the crowd attacked the guards performing the whipping by throwing stones. Malin's younger daughter Maria Eriksdotter was given an official warning to make amends for her sin of perjury.

Malin Matsdotter was the last person to be executed for witch craft in Stockholm, the last person to be executed by burning in Stockholm, and the second last to be executed by burning in Sweden, next to Lars Nilsson in 1693. In 1677, all the priests of the country were ordered to proclaim in their churches that the witches had now been expelled from the country forever, in order to avoid further witch trials. This ended the great Swedish witch hunt of 1668–76. Though there were accusations after this, few people were executed for sorcery after the year of 1676. The last execution for witchcraft took place 1704 when Anna Eriksdotter was decapitated, the last person to be executed for sorcery in Sweden.

== Legacy ==
Malin Matsdotter is the role model for the novel Djävulens Märke by Magnus Nordin. She is a central figure in the children's book series Jakten på Jack by Martin Olczak.
