= Märet Jonsdotter =

Swedish witch

Märet Jonsdotter (1644 – September 1672) was an alleged Swedish witch. She is one of the best known victims of the great witch hysteria called det stora oväsendet ("The Great Noise"), spanning 1668–1676. Märet was the first to be accused, and her trial unleashed a series of witch hunts that led to the deaths of around 280 people. She was known as "Big Märet" because she had a younger sister also named Märet, in turn known as "Small Märet".

== Background and Accusation ==
In the autumn of 1667, a little shepherd boy in Älvdalen in Dalarna, Mats Nilsson, claimed to have seen a girl lead goats over Eastern Dalälven by walking on the water at Hemmansäng by Åsen. This little boy had tended the herd of sheep with this same girl, they had had a fight, and the girl had beaten the boy up. The girl's name was Gertrud Svensdotter (Svensdotter meaning "daughter of Sven"). She was twelve years old.

Gertrud Svensdotter was then interrogated by the priest, Lars Elvius, who encouraged her to say that she had indeed walked on water, and that she had done so by magic, which had been given to her by the Devil. After long talks with the vicar, Gertrud said that while she lived with her parents in Lillhärdal in Härjedalen, a neighbour's maid had taken her to the Devil. The name of the maid was Märet Jonsdotter.

Gertrud Svendsdotter made a detailed confession to the priest. She claimed that, in 1663, when she was eight, Märet had taken her on a walk. They had passed a sand-pit, and then came to a three-way crossroads, where Märet had cried out: "Thou Devil, come forward!". She claimed that Satan had then appeared in the shape of a vicar. They had dined, and the following night, Märet had come to Gertrud and smeared her body and one of her father's cows with a red oil, after which they had flown away through the chimney and all the way to Satan.

Since then, Gertrud had often visited Blockula, milked cattle with familiars, smeared her feet with oil to walk on water and taken children to Blockula, where their names had been written in a book with black pages. The reason she had admitted this was that she had met an angel in Blockula, a man in white, who had told her to confess, or else a hunger epidemic would sweep over the kingdom.

Gertrud's confession came after the shepherd boy Erik Eriksson (15 years old) had reported that he had had a vision in the woods where he was sucked up in the air and saw Gertrud sit in Blockula with the children she had taken, among them his little sister, and that he had heard an angel and a devil discuss how many people they had in their respective kingdoms, and that Gertrud had taken many to the kingdom of the devil. Erik was only to give his testimony once, but he was given credit by the priest of having revealed the whole affair.

The confession of Gertrud was the starting point of the famous "Mora witch trials" and, in the long term, the Swedish witch trials, and the first victim was Märet Jonsdotter. Gertrud also pointed out seven others, and the witch trial started in September 1668. This was the beginning of the real witch hunt in Sweden, a country where witch trials had previously been a rarity.

== The witch trial ==
Märet Jonsdotter was called to court to answer to the accusations. She was urged to confess and to name her accomplices. Märet denied everything. Witnesses were called forward.

The father of Gertrud, Sven Hwass, was one of the witnesses. He claimed that Märet had made him sick and exhausted by using him as a riding horse on her visits to Blockula. Märet had been a maid at his farm and acted as a mother for Gertrud after the death of his wife, and he had the intention to marry her, but he had been discouraged when, during a trip with her to Dalarna, he had been attacked and beaten up by another of her suitors; his rival was the son of an ensign. Märet had then left his household. It was after this incident that Gertrud had been sent away to live with her grandmother's sister in Dalarna.

Märet had a mark on the little finger of her left hand, which was thought to be the Devil's mark. But the only thing they could make her admit were some harmless practices from folklore. She admitted that she had the practice of "reading in salt"; when a cow was sick, she gave it salt which she had moved facing the sun in her hand, and read a verse, which she read up in court: "Jesus our lord travelled mountains and far, he cured shots and magical shots, shots of water and all that is shot between sky and earth. God's worlds and amen." ("Shots" was referring to sickness.) That was all she was prepared to admit.

Gertrud and another girl, Anna Olofsdotter, were then called in to give testimony. Anna Olofsdotter also identified Märet in a confrontation. The girls told Märet that they had confessed because they had come to realise their sins, and that she should do the same, but Märet answered their testimony with questions; if she had truly been in Blockula, then why did she not know about it herself? Why would this be hidden from her? In the end, Märet asked Gertrud to leave – she did not wish to look upon her anymore.

Next, the siblings of Märet (her little sister Small Märet, sixteen years old, and her brothers Oluf, fourteen years old, and Joen, ten years old), were called to give testimony. Small Märet said that her older sister had taken her to Blockula riding backwards on a cow where her name had been written in the book of the Devil with the blood of her left little finger. Big Märet had had sex with Satan, and so did Small Märet after her ninth birthday. The two sisters milked with familiars and rode cows to slaughter to Blockula every Christmas and Easter. Her little brothers said almost the same thing, except that it was their father Jon who had taken them, and that their big sister would never admit anything.

At the testimony of her little siblings, Märet Jonsdotter told them that they had forsaken God and were heading for a dark road, and crossed herself. Her little sister and brothers cried and embraced her and pleaded with her to confess to save her soul, as did her mother, the only one in the family who was blameless. Märet denied everything, said that she had no idea what they were talking about, and asked God to forgive them.

Märet's siblings continued their confession by saying that they had not got even halfway to Trondheim, and pointed out a woman in the audience, Karin i Äggen, called "Widow Karin", who was to have rested with them in the cathedral in Trondheim on the way. They continued to point out Karin Biörsdotter, Oluf Biörsson, Brita Jonsdotter, Per Nils Anna and Märet Persdotter. At the end of the day, ten people were accused.

== Blåkulla ==
The story about the children's stay in the Witches' Sabbath in Blåkulla (Bluehill) spread rapidly, and everywhere, children started to talk about it and make up stories. Their confessions were very similar to the first ones that were made by the children in this trial, and were to be a standard for the following witch trials of 1668–1676.

In Blåkulla, people partied as if at a wedding; they drank, ate, danced and had sex by the light of candles that were placed in vaginas while Satan sat under the table and laughed so that the whole room shook and the fire of hell poured up from a hole in the floor, where you could see the tormented souls in hell. You danced with your backs towards each other, as well as doing everything else backwards, married several people at the same time, and had sex with them and with Satan himself, and with his devils and demons, whose penises were cold and whose sperm was made of water and gave birth to frogs that were swept up from the floor with a broom and were made into butter. When you woke up afterwards, your body ached, the food you had eaten had vanished and made you hungry and the gifts you had received had turned to woodchip.

An interesting phenomenon was that the children, except from Satan and his demons, also claimed to have seen angels in Blåkulla. Next door to Satan's dining room was the angels' chamber, decorated with benches as if in a church, and completely white from floor to ceiling, from where God himself, dressed in a grey cloak and with a grey beard ("Just a Mr Olof in Mo", as the children said) cried to them: "Come here, you are my children". The angels had the claws of birds instead of hands and feet, and they were dressed in surplices of white linen and tight pants, and they pulled the Devil's food away from the children's hands, cried tears as big as peas, and asked them to confess so the witches could be exterminated and send the message that one should not have to work on Thursdays, nor use shirts with frilled sleeves, and not have to sell tobacco above its fairest price.

The children's situation was, after all, dubious; they were not only victims of the witches which had kidnapped them. They had also sworn themselves to the Devil, eaten his food and had sex. To claim angelic help was believed to be a way for the children to point out that they had been innocent victims, and mention of "The White Angels of Blåkulla" was very popular in the children's testimonies. The court was never very interested in the angels; they asked the children, if the angels really did try to stop them from eating Satan's food, why did they not stop them from doing worse, such as having sex with the demons?

== Verdict ==
On 1 April 1669, Märet Jonsdotter and Widow Karin were judged guilty against their own words. There was a problem however. Swedish law forbade the execution of anyone who had not confessed their crime, no matter if they were judged guilty or not. Neither of them was willing to admit any guilt, and continued to plead innocent, just as they had done from the day they were accused. This put the court in a dilemma. The use of torture was not applicable in this case. The two women were not aware of the law, and the court therefore decided upon a plan to solve the legal predicament and get them to confess and thereby make it possible to execute them.

The priests were to persuade them to confess by using religious arguments; the priests should tell them that they were to be executed whether they confessed or not. But if they confessed, they would receive holy communion, and thereby go straight to heaven. They were to be taken to the place of execution believing this, given the communion, and the execution would thereafter be conducted. If they continued to deny all, however, there would be no choice but to take them back to jail.

This whole plan was put into effect and conducted just as described. At the place of execution, Märet and Karin were told that they could confess and receive communion, or deny all. Both chose to say no to communion and deny the charges. The frustrated authorities then had no choice but to escort Märet Jonsdotter and Karin back to prison. Gertrud Svensdotter and the siblings of Märet were flogged and then released. The remaining people accused were acquitted, but the hysteria was hard to stop and more were soon put on trial. Soon, 23 people were put on trial for abducting of children to Satan, and on 19 May 1669, eight people (seven women and one man) were executed as result of the process against Märet Jonsdotter.

== Execution and the Mora witch trial ==
However, this first witch trial had started a mass hysteria. The stories spread across the parishes, and increased when the priests made the verdicts public by announcing them in church as a warning. In March 1669, the trial against Märet had resulted in a hysteria which caused the Mora witch trial, which has been made famous in history because it was given much attention on the continent where it was illustrated and published; sixty people were put on trial, and fourteen of them (one man, thirteen women) were executed by decapitation the same year. On the continent, the Mora witches were illustrated to have been burned alive, but the illustrations were made in Germany, where witches were often burned alive at the stake in contrast to Sweden, where witches were decapitated before burning. In 1670, the so-called "witch-prayer" was read in the churches, and in 1671, fifty-six people stood accused of abduction of children to Satan and witchcraft in Lillhärdal. Three of them confessed and were executed. It is not known what happened to the rest. The children started to talk about how the witches had taken them to the place of executions to be decapitated, and the witch trials now ended in this part of the country.

Throughout this time, Märet Jonsdotter remained in prison, exposed to continued religious persuasion from the priests to confess her sin. During four years imprisonment and attempts to brainwash her, she continued to declare her innocence and refused to confess.

On 16 April 1672, despite her constant denial, Svea Hovrätt declared Märet guilty of sorcery due to all the incriminating testimonies, and the devil's mark on her finger, and sentenced her to be decapitated and burned. The court declared that: "Her mere denial can not help her nor free her from the life sentence"; the same year, the court had noticed that several people accused had become aware that they would escape a death sentence if they maintained their innocence, and therefore, one of the eight people executed for witchcraft in Ovanåker in 1672 had been executed without a confession. From 1674, it was declared no longer necessary to have a confession in the case of witchcraft.

She was judged together with thirty-four people; of them, her younger sister Small Märet, Kerstin Halvarsdotter, Påls Märet (or Phåls-Malin Biörsdotter) and Gertrud Olofsdotter received a death sentence. Of the condemned, Märet Jonsdotter and Pål Märet were the only ones who were executed without having confessed; the rest all admitted guilt. They were all executed together, except Kerstin, who was pregnant, on an unknown date sometime before 25 September 1672. There is not much known about this final execution.

Widow Karin, however, was released. Of the many people who were put on trial for sorcery in Härjedalen in 1668–72, seven people were executed. Gertrud Svensdotter was to witness the execution of the condemned in Mora on 19 May 1669. In 1670, she was called upon by the priest to recall her story for his guest in the vicarage. She married in 1673 to Lars Mattson (21), another of the witnesses of the witch trial. She died of unknown causes in 1675, buried one week after having given birth to a son, who also died.

The witch hysteria continued to rage through the country until the execution of Malin Matsdotter in Stockholm in 1676. In 1677, to avoid any further witch trials, the government ordered the priests to declare, through the churches, that all witches had now been expelled from the country forever.

== See also ==
- Elin i Horsnäs
- Torsåker witch trials
- Gävle-Boy
- Brita Zippel
- Anna Zippel
