= Viktoria Wallén =

Swedish playwright and screenwriter

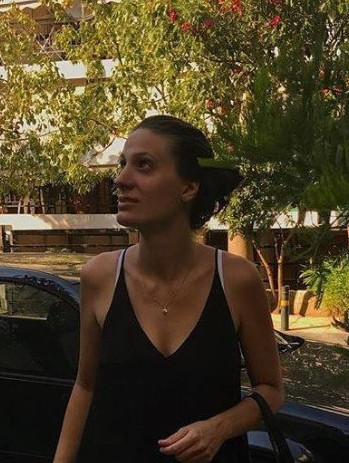
- Born: 1986 (age 39–40); Stockholm, Sweden
- Education: Uppsala university
- Occupations: Playwright; screenwriter

Viktoria Wallén is a Swedish playwright and screenwriter.

Her one-act play Anna was staged at the Teaterverket theatre, Stockholm, Sweden during the spring season of 2022. Anna, a magical realist play, takes place in a fictionalized 17th century Sweden during the period of witch-hunts also known as the Great noise. The title character Anna expresses present-day values, and consequently faces charges of witchcraft.

== Works ==
- Anna (2021).
