= Torsåker witch trials =

Largest witch trials in Swedish history

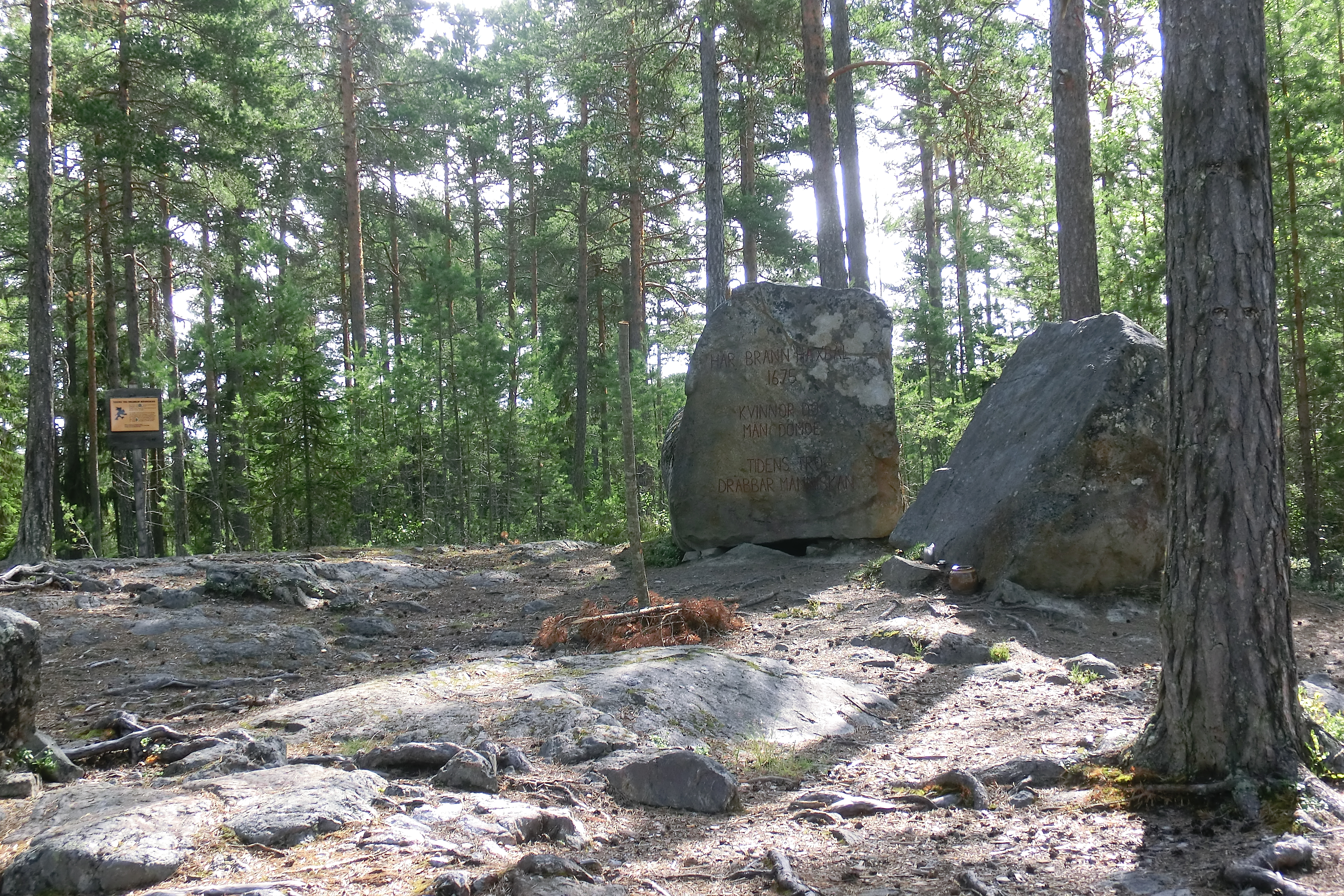
A memorial stone for the Torsåker witch trials of 1675.

The Torsåker witch trials took place in 1675 in Torsåker parish in Sweden and were the largest witch trials in Swedish history. In a single day 71 people (65 women and 6 men) were beheaded and then burned.

== Background ==
The witch trial reached Torsåker as a result and a consequence of the great wave of witch hysteria known as stora oväsendet, which had begun to flourish over Sweden after the trial caused by Gertrud Svensdotter against Märet Jonsdotter in Dalarna in 1668. Sweden did not have separation of church and state, causing state-employed Lutheran priests to abide by government instructions.

The Lutheran clergy were ordered to use their sermons to inform their congregations of the crimes committed. Thus, the rumour of the witches spread over the country, where witch-hunts had earlier been a rarity. Hornæus was ordered to perform an investigation by order of the special commission which had been created to deal with the suddenly erupted witch panic.

The trials began when Johannes Wattrangius of Torsåker parish told Laurentius Christophori Hornæus of Ytterlännäs parish to investigate witchcraft in his parish. Ytterlännäs and Torsåker were both in the Diocese of Härnösand of the Lutheran Church of Sweden. Hornæus was zealous in his work — by the time his task was complete, 71 people had been beheaded and burned. 65 of these were women, which was roughly one fifth of all women in the region.

== Trial ==
The priest had two boys stand at the door of the church to identify the witches by an invisible mark on their forehead as they went in. On one occasion, one of these boys pointed at the wife of the priest himself, Britta Rufina. People gasped, but she, as she told her grandson who wrote down the story, then slapped the boy, and he quickly apologized when he saw who he had pointed at, and said he had been blinded by the sun.

Hornæus was a priest with a terrifying reputation. The witnesses of the witch trial were mostly children, as the main accusations of the witches was that they had abducted children on the sabbath of Satan, and Hornæus had several methods to get them to give the testimony he wanted. He whipped them, he bathed children in the ice cold water of a hole in the ice in the lakes in winter, he put them in an oven, showed them fuel and pretended that he would light the fire in the oven and boil them.

The best source for the trial is an account written by Jöns Hornæus, a grandson of the priest, who wrote down the story in 1735 after it was dictated by his grandmother, Laurentius Hornæus' wife Britta Rufina. She was quoted as saying: "I remember some of these witnesses, who by these methods were in lack of health for the rest of their lives". He adds that children were still, sixty years afterwards, afraid to go near the house where his grandfather lived.

On 15 October 1674, the witch trial of Torsåker opened. About one hundred people, of both sexes, were accused by the children. Even though this was the biggest witch trial in the country, the original documents of the trial provide little information of bad quality. The documents of 1674 simply summarize that the trial was very similar to the other trials and was very typical in every way, except for the uncommonly large number of victims. This would mean that the prisoners were accused of abducting children to the sabbath of Satan in Blockula.

Out of the one hundred people accused, it is unclear how many were convicted and not executed. Jöns Hornæus claims many of those convicted escaped, and that some of the women were not executed because of pregnancy. The prisoners were kept in several different places in the village. They were given almost no food but were allowed to receive food from their relatives.

== Execution ==
After the last sermon in the church of Torsåker, the prisoners, 71 people (65 women and 6 men) were led to the place of execution. Jöns Hornæus describes the execution in his book, where he wrote down the exact words of his grandmother, the eyewitness Britta Rufina, and she describes it like this, after a speech in the church:

Then they began to understand what would happen. Cries to heaven rose of vengeance over those who caused their innocent deaths, but no cries and no tears would help. Parents, men and brothers held a fence of pikes. (By which she meant that the men of the village, the family members of the prisoners, surrounded the prisoners with weapons) They were driven, seventy one of them, of which only two could sing a psalm, which they repeated when they walked as soon as it ended. Many fainted on the way out of weakness and death wish, and those were carried by their families up until the place of execution, which was in the middle in the parish, half a mile from all the three churches, and called "The Mountain of the Stake."

On the mountain, the prisoners were decapitated away from the stakes, so as not to drown the wood in blood and make it hard to light, and when they were dead, their families took off their clothes and lifted their bodies on the stakes, which were lit and burned until they went out by themselves. The families of the executed then went home, according to Britta Rufina, without showing any emotions, as if they were completely numbed.

== Aftermath ==
The Torsåker executions had, even at the time they occurred, dubious legitimacy. Neither the commission or any local courts had the rights to conduct any executions. They were expected to report their sentences to the higher court, which was to confirm them before the sentences could be carried out. The high court normally only confirmed a minority of the death sentences. In the case of Torsåker, the local court commission did not report the sentences to the high court, but executed the prisoners directly without confirmation of the sentences from their superiors, and the execution was therefore not lawful. The commission was also called from Torsåker to the capital to answer for their actions. They were defended by the local authorities in Torsåker, but there were to be no more executions in Torsåker.

The witch-hunt in the country continued; after the Torsåker witch trial, it reached the capital, where it lasted until 1676 and ended with the execution of Malin Matsdotter during the Katarina witch trials in Stockholm, after which the authorities proved that the child witnesses were lying and it had been a mistake. In 1677, all the priests in the country were ordered to tell their congregations in the churches that the witches had now been expelled from the country forever to avoid further witch trials. In Torsåker, the boys who had pointed at the women at the church, the so-called "visgossarna" (the tale boys), were found with their throats cut.

== Memorial stone ==
In 1975, a memorial stone was erected in Torsåker in honor of the victims of Torsåker witch trials.
