= Kyöpelinvuori =

Finnish mythical land

Kyöpelinvuori (Finnish pronunciation: [ˈkyø̯pelinˌʋuo̯ri], from kyöpeli (obsolete word for ‘ghost’), and vuori ‘mountain’), in Finnish mythology, is the place which dead women haunt. It is rumored that women who die virgins gather there after death. Similar stories of paradise mountains for pious virgins have also been known in Catholic Central Europe and Russia. It corresponds to Blockula (in modern Swedish Blåkulla) of Swedish mythology.

Due to Christian influence, Kyöpelinvuori has been associated with beliefs in the witch sabbath.

According to the National Land Survey of Finland, there is a total number of 32 Kyöpelinvuori hills in Finland.
