= Katarina witch trials =

Witch trial in Sweden

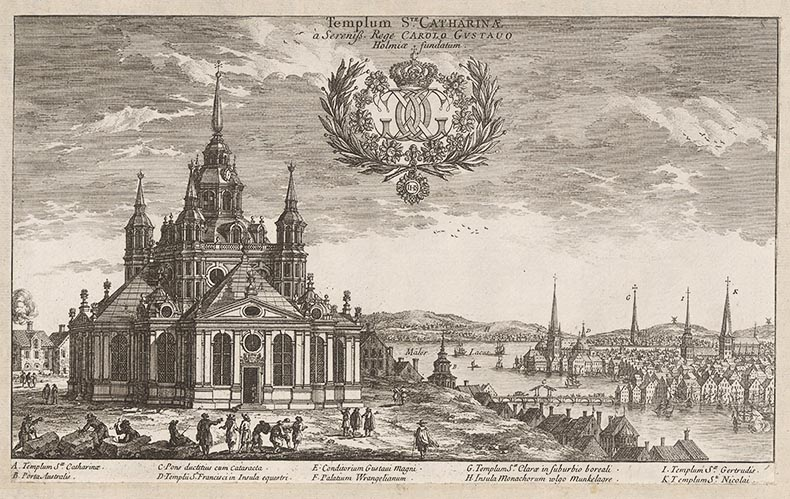
Katarina Church at the time of the witch trials.

The Katarina witch trials took place in the Katarina Parish in the capital of Stockholm in Sweden in 1676. It was a part of the big witch hunt known as the Great noise, which took place in Sweden between the years 1668 and 1676, and it also illustrated the end of it.

Almost all of the accusers, the accused and the witnesses associated with the trials lived in the Katarina Parish area. The Katarina witch trials resulted in the execution of eight people accused of having abducted children to the Witches' Sabbath, and the suicide in prison of one more. More people were charged before being acquitted. The trials ended when the child witnesses were exposed as liars under dramatic circumstances, which resulted in the end of not only the Katarina witch trials but also the entire national Great noise witch hunt.

== Background ==
The Mora witch trials in 1668, where 17 people were sentenced to death for having abducted children to Satan, caused a nationwide witch panic. The phenomena of witches abducting children to the Witches' Sabbath of Satan of Blockula, where they were exposed to sexual abuse and forced to sell their souls, caused widespread panic among the parents of the nation, and parents of several parishes, alarmed by the rumours among their children, started to demand that the authorities issue investigations in their parishes. In this way, witch trials spread from parish to parish, when more and more parents demanded that their children's stories be investigated.

Eventually, the witch panic spreading around the provinces and the growing number of local witch trials caused the government to form a central national Witchcraft Commission in an attempt to take control of the situation. In 1670, the authorities gave order that a special Witches' Prayer was to be held in the churches in order to calm the senses, and this prayer was held also in Katarina.

== The trials ==
In 1675, the twelve year old Gävle Boy arrived to the Katarina Parish in Stockholm to live with a hawker relative, after his mother had fallen victim to the Gävle witch trial. The Gävle Boy entertained the children in the block with stories about the Witches' Sabbath of Satan, where he claimed to have attended several times, having been abducted by witches.

After this, several children started to claim, that they had also been abducted by witches to the Witches' Sabbath. The rumours among the children of abductions to Satan concerned parents in the block, who arranged so called "wake cottages", where children were gathered in the house of the hawker, where they were guarded, to prevent them from being abducted by witches during the night. Among the children and the people engaged to guard them in the wake cottages were the Gävle Boy himself, Lisbeth Carlsdotter, the Myra maids, Kerstin Jacobsdotter, Lisbet Wellendorf and Melcher Olsson, who were all later to be known as the child witnesses.

During the nights in the wake cottage, the children, when asked about the identity of the witches abducting them, started to name Britta Sippel, Anna Sippel and Anna Månsdotter as witches. Finally, 48 concerned parents of the Katarina Parish petitioned the authorities, demanding an investigation in order to protect their children from being abducted by witches. On 11 April 1676, the witch trial started with the first interrogation, of the accused cap maker Anna Månsdotter.

=== First trials ===
Anna Månsdotter had visited one of the wake cottages, expressed concern over the rumours and asked whom the children had pointed out as witches, and cried when she was given the reply that she herself had been accused by the children. Anna Månsdotter was an acquaintance of Britta Sippel, who had a rumour for sorcery since several years back, and who had also been mentioned by the children in the wake cottage. Britta Sippel was the sister of the baker's wife Anna Sippel, who also manufactured herbal medicines, which was sold by Anna Månsdotter. All three denied the accusations, and the trials against them took a long time.

Anna Månsdotter, Brita Sippel and Anna Sippel were all executed together on 29 April 1676. They were executed by decapitation, after which their corpses were publicly burnt at the stake, which was the customary method of execution.

The husband of Britta Sippel, Jöran Nilsson Galle, was also arrested and accused, though his trial was postponed.

=== Second trials ===
After the first executions, two young maidservants, Margareta Matsdotter and Maria Jöransdotter, voluntarily reported themselves to the authorities for witchcraft. It has been speculated that Margareta Matsdotter and Maria Jöransdotter were suicidal and saw an opportunity to commit suicide by using the authorities to execute them, which was to reason to why they cooperated despite being fully sane. That they had reported themselves supposedly took the child witnesses by surprise, since the children had not named Margareta Matsdotter and Maria Jöransdotter. In their confusion, the child witnesses first gave contradictory statements. Margareta Matsdotter and Maria Jöransdotter however assured the authorities that they were guilty, and adjusted their own confessions so as to fit in with the statements given by the children. Their trials went very swiftly because of their cooperation, and they were judged guilty.

Margareta Matsdotter pointed out her employer Agnis Johansdotter, and Maria Jöransdotter the blacksmith's wife Karin Johansdotter, as the older women who had introduced them in to witchcraft. The trial of Agnis Johansdotter was postponed to a later date, and Karin Johansdotter committed suicide in prison. Next, Margareta Matsdotter and Maria Jöransdotter together pointed out Anna Persdotter as their accomplice. Anna Persdotter absolutely refused to confess, and was therefore sentenced to be burnt alive. Her sentence was reduced to customary decapitation when Margareta Matsdotter and Maria Jöransdotter convinced her to confess. Margareta Matsdotter, Maria Jöransdotter and Anna Persdotter were the only people in the Katarina witch trials who explicitly confessed themselves guilty of witchcraft. They were executed by decapitation on 12 May 1676.

At this point in time, the imprisoned Jöran Nilsson Galle, himself accused of witchcraft, and his daughter, who was one of the wake cottage child witnesses, pointed out three folk healers, the women Helena Olofsdotter and Elsa Thomasdotter and the man Erik Eriksson, for witchcraft. Galle had been their patient on occasion. However, the trials against them was a problem for the judges, since these charges did not fit the crimes investigated during the Katarina witch trials. They were not accused for having abducted children to Satan in Blockula, but simply for sorcery because they were folk healers. Folk healers were often reported, because they often abused God's name in spells, but authorities normally did not execute this category of people, and therefore decided to deal with them as they normally did with folk healers: they confessed to have abused the name of God, stated their regret, and was sentenced to pillorying. A young housewife, Elisabet Eriksdotter, was also accused of child abduction to Satan around this time, but for undocumented reasons, the judges did not find the accusations believable in her case and acquitted her.

=== Third trials ===
In the third trial, Anna Simonsdotter Hack and Malin Matsdotter were put on trial for having abducted children to Satan in Blockula. Hack had been accused by the children in the wake cottages, and Matsdotter by her own daughters.

Anna Simonsdotter Hack never explicitly confessed guilty of sorcery. However, she repeatedly stated during her imprisonment that she deserved to die due to the sins she had committed in life and that she was willing to do so. The judges interpreted this as her confession of sorcery.

Malin Matsdotter on the other hand explicitly refused to plead guilty and denied everything she was accused of from the moment of her arrest until the moment she was executed. As with Anna Persdotter, the judges sentenced her to be burnt alive due to her refusal to confess, but, in contrast to the case of Anna Persdotter, Malin Marsdotter's sentence was carried out. Her execution became infamous as the only case in which a "witch" was executed by being burnt alive at the stake in Sweden during the witch hunt.

=== Fourth trials ===
The trials against the hawker's wife Karin Ambjörnsdotter, the maidservant Margareta Matsdotter known as "The Dove", and the official's wife Margareta Remmer followed. All three had been accused by the child witnesses of the wake cottages, particularly Lisbeth Carlsdotter and the Myra maids, and were charged with having abducted children to Satan. Karin Ambjörnsdotter lost her composure, blasphemed before court, and was defended by her husband. Margareta Matsdotter "The Dove" was a poor young maidservant who had been accused because her suitor, a tailor, had given her a silk dress, a gift which had made people assume she used sorcery. She was subjected to torture and confessed, but retracted her testimony as soon as the torture ended. Both Karin Ambjörnsdotter and "The Dove" was sentenced to death.

== The turning point ==
The trial against the City Captain's (essentially the equivalent of the chief of the city police) wife Margareta Staffansdotter Remmer was a turning point. Remmer, being married to a city official, belonged to a higher social class: she was fiercely supported by her husband, and defended herself well in court. Remmer was accused of having abducted the children of Peder Gråå, and it was revealed that Peder Gråå had in fact previously been charged with smuggling by Remmer's husband.

In parallel, the child witnesses started to name the king's aunt Maria Euphrosyne of Zweibrücken and countess Maria Sofia De la Gardie as witches, allegations that could not possibly lead to charges, since the women were of too high of a class to be charged with such a crime. This resulted in doubt among the members of the Witchcraft Commission about the credibility of the child witnesses. Several members of the Witchcraft Commission, notably Eric Noraeus and Urban Hjärne, had a growing concern over the rights of those accused and the testimonies used to condemn them, particularly as the testimonies were given by children who were merely asked to confirm their former statement rather than to repeat them.

== The 11 September ==
The court decided to interrogate the child witnesses by asking them to repeat their testimonies in court each time, rather than just affirm their previous testimonies. The new tactic caused problems for several of the child witnesses, who were not able to repeat their testimonies consistently.

On 11 September 1676, one of the child witnesses admitted to have lied in court and committed perjury. This confession was followed by the complete breakdown by 17 of the child witnesses before court, who admitted to having lied, coached by other witnesses. Seventeen child witnesses admitted in court that they had been lying all along, pressed to testify falsely by other children or teenagers. The court was finally able to identify six main witnesses: the Gävle Boy, Lisbet Carlsdotter, the Myra maids (Agnis Eskilsdotter and Annika Henriksdotter), Maria Nilsdotter and Mikael Jakobsson, as the ring leaders among the child perjurers, who had coached other children to lie.

The 11 September court session caused the Witchcraft Commission to dissolve the entire witch trial. All those being in prison at the time of the 11 September were acquitted and released. This included two women (Karin Ambjörnsdotter and Margareta Matsdotter "The Dove") who had been sentenced to death at the time, and awaiting their execution, as well as Margareta Remmer, Jöran Nilsson Galle, Agnis Johansdotter and Karin Fontelius (the last of whom, Fontelius, was actually an accused of the witch trial in Gävle, whose case had been transferred to the capital). The whole witch trial was discontinued, and the authorities instead focused on prosecuting the witnesses for perjury.

== Aftermath ==
Many of the witnesses of the Katarina witch trials were prosecuted for perjury when the witch trial was dissolved. They were arrested by the soldiers of the city watch, under command of the city captain, whose wife Margareta Remmer had recently been accused of sorcery during the Katarina witch trials and who expressed herself adamant to see them be punished.

The main child witnesses: the Gävle Boy, Lisbet Carlsdotter, Maria Nilsdotter and one of the Myra maids (Agnis Eskilsdotter) were executed for perjury. Other witnesses were sentenced to lesser punishments such as being whipped and sentenced to the work house. The remaining myra maid, Annika Henriksdotter, was whipped and sentenced to the work house. The same sentence was given to the two daughters of Malin Matsdotter; Anna Eriksdotter and Maria Eriksdotter, who had testified against their mother; and to Annika Persdotter, who had testified against both her mother Brita Sippel, her father Jöran Sippel and her aunt Anna Sippel; she was whipped and died in the work house from the injuries she received from the whipping. According to the reports of the Witchcraft Commission, the public punishments of the perjuries caused all the remaining child witnesses to suddenly stop talking about witches.

In 1677, the Witchcraft Commission and the government ordered the clergy nationwide to stop all witch panic by conducting a prayer of gratitude in their pulpits, thanking God that the witches had now been banned forever from the Kingdom. When some of the clergymen protested and insisted that the witches had indeed been guilty and the sorcery real, they were lectured by the Witchcraft Commission and forced to comply. By that act, the great witch hunt known as the Great Noise of 1668–1676 was ended in Sweden and the Witchcraft Commission was dissolved.

== The accused ==
Eight people were executed during the Katarina witch trials, and one committed suicide in prison. After 11 September 1676, when the child witnesses admitted to have committed perjury, the entire witch trial was discontinued, which resulted in the acquittal of the remaining prisoners.

1. Britta Sippel "Näslösan" ("Noseless"), mason's wife, executed 29 April 1676.
2. Anna Sippel, milner's wife, executed 29 April 1676.
3. Anna Månsdotter "Vipp-upp-med-näsan" ("Upp-with-the-nose"), capmaker, executed 29 April 1676.
4. Karin Johansdotter, "Smeds-Karin" ("Black Smith's Karin") blacksmiths' wife, committed suicide in prison.
5. Maria Jöransdotter, "Ängsjöpigan" ("The Ängsjö Maid"), maidservant, executed 12 May 1676.
6. Margareta Matsdotter, maidservant, executed 12 May 1676.
7. Anna Persdotter, gunner's wife, executed 12 May 1676.
8. Malin Matsdotter "Rumpare-Malin", executed 5 August 1676.
9. Anna Simonsdotter Hack, "Tysk-Annika" ("German-Anna"), tailor's wife, executed 5 August 1676.
10. Elsa Thomasdotter, "Lilla Guden" ("[The] Little God"), folk healer, sentenced to pillorying.
11. Helena Olofsdotter, "Sjumans-Elin" ("Seven-men's-Elin"), folk healer, sentenced to pillorying.
12. Erik Eriksson, folk healer, sentenced to pillorying.
13. Elisabet Eriksdotter, acquitted.
14. Karin Fontelius, vicar's wife, acquitted after 11 September 1676.
15. Margareta Staffansdotter Remmer, city captain's wife, acquitted after 11 September 1676.
16. Karin Ambjörnsdotter, hawker's wife, sentenced to death but acquitted after 11 September 1676.
17. Margareta Matsdotter, "Dufvan" ("The Dove"), maidservant, sentenced to death but acquitted after 11 September 1676.
18. Jöran Nilsson Galle, "Näslösken" ("[The] Noseless [man]"), stonemason, acquitted after 11 September 1676.
19. Agnis Johansdotter, ”Göstas Finska” ("Gösta's Finn [-ish woman]"), day laborer's wife, acquitted after 11 September 1676.
