= Anna Eriksdotter =

Swedish woman executed for witchcraft

Anna Eriksdotter or Anna Ersdotter (1624 – 15 June 1704) called Sotpackan (English: 'soot witch'), was a Swedish woman who was executed for witchcraft. She was the last person to be executed for witchcraft in Sweden.

== Life ==
Anna Eriksdotter was from Bollnäs. She moved to Lista with her husband, who was a soldier, in 1680. She was rumored to have a pact with Satan for decades before she was put on trial because of her claimed ability to heal blood wounds and her good hand with animals, which gave her the sobriquet 'Sotpackan'. She was employed as a domestic servant of the parish vicar, but he fired her when he heard about the gossip about her. She was poor, and it appears that she was essentially begging, since it is described as normal for her to always ask for a gift of something when she left after visiting the villagers.

One morning when the vicar was going to the church to give a sermon, seeds were observed laying on the road to the church, and when he arrived, he was allegedly unable to speak. The rumour was, that Anna had cast a spell on the vicar, making him unable to hold the sermon, as a revenge after he fired her.

=== Witch trial ===
In 1704, Anna Eriksdotter was arrested and imprisoned in Eskilstuna on the charge of witchcraft. She was accused of having cast a spell on the villager Nils Jonsson, causing him to experience loss of sight, speech and hearing. Nils Jonsson claimed that her motive was a conflict between them caused by his refusal to give her tobacco on a Sunday visit she had made to him. She was refused tobacco but shared dinner with him and was given a sausage, a cake and some wool when she left.

Some days later, he had been standing talking with the widow Karin when he suddenly felt a whiff of wind, despite the fact that there had been no wind that day, and the next moment, half of his face had gone numb, liquid flowed from his right eye and his mouth went twisted. Anna had been sent for and asked to remove her spell and give him back the use of his ability to see and speak. She agreed to do so, and told him that he would awake the next morning recovered. The next morning, his ability to see and speak was indeed restored, but not his hearing, as he had forgotten to ask her for that. Several witnesses, among them Karin, confirmed his statement.

Anna Eriksdotter herself freely confirmed the whole story without any torture being put to use. She claimed that she had performed some spells because Nils Jonsson had acted "Somewhat disgusting" towards her and because he had refused to give her tobacco, and that she had done so with the help of Satan. She also confessed to having put a curse on the vicar as vengeance after he fired her. As a witch, she had created wolves by use of magic and ordered them to attack the neighbour's sheep years previous when Jonsson's wife's first husband was still alive, by blowing a horn together with Satan. She stated that she had been in the service of Satan since her childhood, when her mother had smeared a calf with ointment and flew with her on it through the chimney to Blockula, and that her father, brother and two sisters had also been "tainted by the same sin".

However, as she became old and nearer to death, she had come to regret her service of Satan because of her fear of the hell which awaited her after death, and she stated that she would be satisfied regardless if she was pardoned or executed. During her imprisonment, she was described as remorseful and "very devout in her prayers and invocations".

The local court judged her as guilty of sorcery on her confession and sentenced her to death in accordance with contemporary law. The national high court recommended the king to spare her the death penalty and give her some lesser punishment because she was "old and confused [...] speek of things which cannot be anything but illusions" and was full of "mad imaginations", but the monarch confirmed the death sentence. Anna Eriksdotter was executed by decapitation in Eskilstuna on 15 June 1704. She was the last person to be executed for sorcery in Sweden.

== Aftermath ==
Few people had been executed for this crime since Malin Matsdotter in 1676, and Anna Eriksdotter was to be the last one. Guilty verdicts for witchcrafts did occur however, even if they did not result in the death penalty. In 1724, several women in Södra Ny socken, Värmland who confessed to have abducted children to Satan was sentenced to be whipped, which was the last time anyone was judged guilty of sorcery in Sweden. In 1757, the last witch trial occurred Ål in Dalarna, where thirteen women and five men were accused of child abduction to Satan, but the witch trial was stopped when Catherine Charlotte De la Gardie made it known in the capital that a witch trial was taking place in the provinces. Formally, the law of witchcraft remained until it was abolished in 1779.
