= Laurentius Christophori Hornæus =

Swedish witch hunter (1645–1719)

Laurentius Christophori Hornaeus or also known as Lars Christophri Hornæus (1645 – April 27, 1719), was a priest of the Church of Sweden. He was the parish vicar of Torsåker and Ytterlännäs, Sweden, and known for his role during the Torsåker witch trials.

== Life ==
He was born as Lars Christoffersson in Härnösand in 1645. In this time period Sweden, it was common for students and priests to use the Latinized form of their names, and their birthplace was sometimes added as a family name. Hornaeus most likely is the Latinized version of Härnösand. Lars started his theological studies in the 1660s, and in 1667 he and his brother Petrus were both studying together at the University of Uppsala.

In 1668 a witch panic spread around Sweden, and in 1674 the witch panic reached Torsåker. Laurentius Christophri Hornaeus presided at the Torsåker witch trials, which became the largest witch trial in Sweden's history.

Laurentius died on April 27, 1719, in Nordanåker, Ytterlännäs parish. He was buried under the old church in Ytterlännäs where a hatch in the floor between the altar and the door to the sacristy leads to his still preserved grave. Lars Larsson Hornaeus took over his father's pastorate in 1719 and led the congregation until his death in 1751.
