= Captain Elin =

Swedish cottager and witchcraft defendant

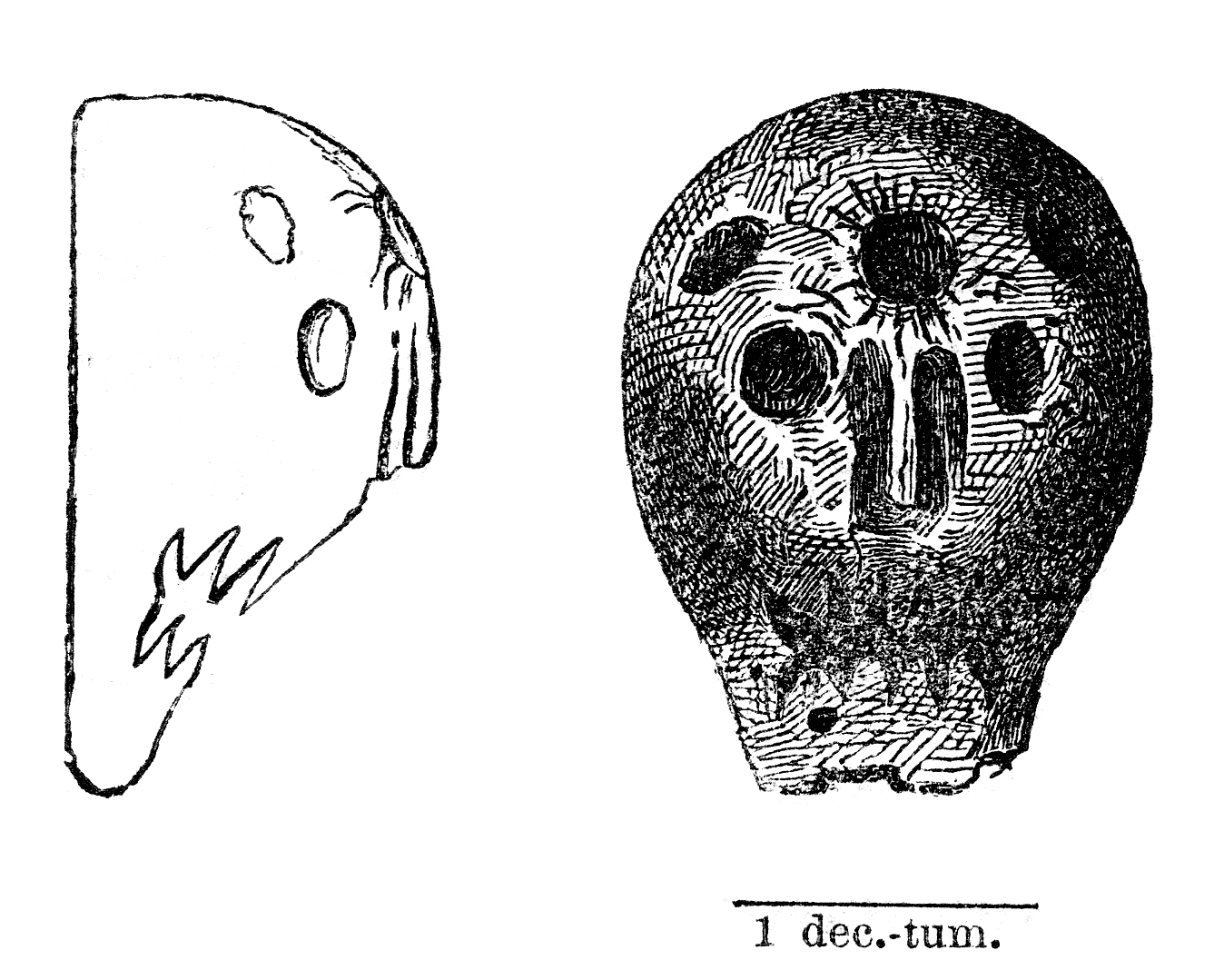
Illustration from Wärend och Wirdarne: "The idol of Captain Elin the Troll Woman, preserved at the Göta Court of Appeal"

Elin Ericksdotter (c.1660 – after 1724), known as Elin of Mofikerud or Captain Elin, was a Swedish tenant farmer and cunning woman (folk healer) who was charged with witchcraft. Elin was one of the central figures among the accused in the protracted Södra Ny witch trials – Sweden's second to last witch trials.

== Biography ==
Elin Ericksdotter of Kopparviken from Mofikerud is said to have been around 60 years old in 1720. She is described as destitute and was professionally active as a wise woman (folk healer). She was unpopular and was believed to bring misfortune because of her engagement in what was perceived as magical practices.

In 1720, she was accused by the cottager girl Brita Persdotter of Lillängen of being one of the women Brita had seen participating in a witches' sabbath at Blåkulla. Brita pointed to Elin as the leader of the witches who took people to Blåkulla. Elin, as the alleged leader of the witches, was referred to as Captain Elin.

Brita's story was typical: she claimed that Elin came to her bedroom through the chimney on Easter night. Elin had placed a wooden log in Brita's bed to appear as her during her absence and then smeared a stick with oil from a horn and, after reciting a magical formula, flew with her into the air, where the stick turned into a hare. Along the way, as they flew with other witches, they met the Devil, who cut Brita's finger and snipped a lock of her hair. The witches then followed him to Ny parish church, where the Devil conducted a black mass and gave them the sacrament, which was his body and blood instead of Christ's. The company then flew to a farm outside Karlstad, which turned out to be Blåkulla, where Satan's wife, "a small person dressed in long gray linen," was also present. On their way home, the witches scraped metal from church bells, milked cows illicitly, and placed misfortune-bringing items under their neighbors' thresholds. Upon returning, Brita became ill, hungry, and overcome with guilt, leading her to confess.

Unlike most of her co-accused, Elin admitted guilt and maintained her confession. Initially, she denied the charges, but after "persuasion" from the district judge, the bailiff, and attending priests, she confessed. She claimed that three years earlier, Satan had visited her while she was alone at home, as her husband was away. He asked why she was living in poverty and took her to beautiful houses, showing her splendid gifts he promised to give her. She also received food and drink. Upon returning, she was given an ointment horn, felt hungry despite all she had eaten, and had since visited Blåkulla on Maundy Thursday, Good Friday, and Easter night. She was imprisoned for four years before a sentence was finally passed. In 1724, she was sentenced to flogging and banishment.

== Legacy ==
Elin of Mofikerud, under the name Captain Elin, became a well-known figure in Swedish folklore. According to Ebbe Schön, she became "the central figure in a remarkable number of witch legends told in Sweden during the 19th century". Numerous broadside ballads about Captain Elin were published between 1815 and 1853.

=== Captain Elin's magical artifacts ===
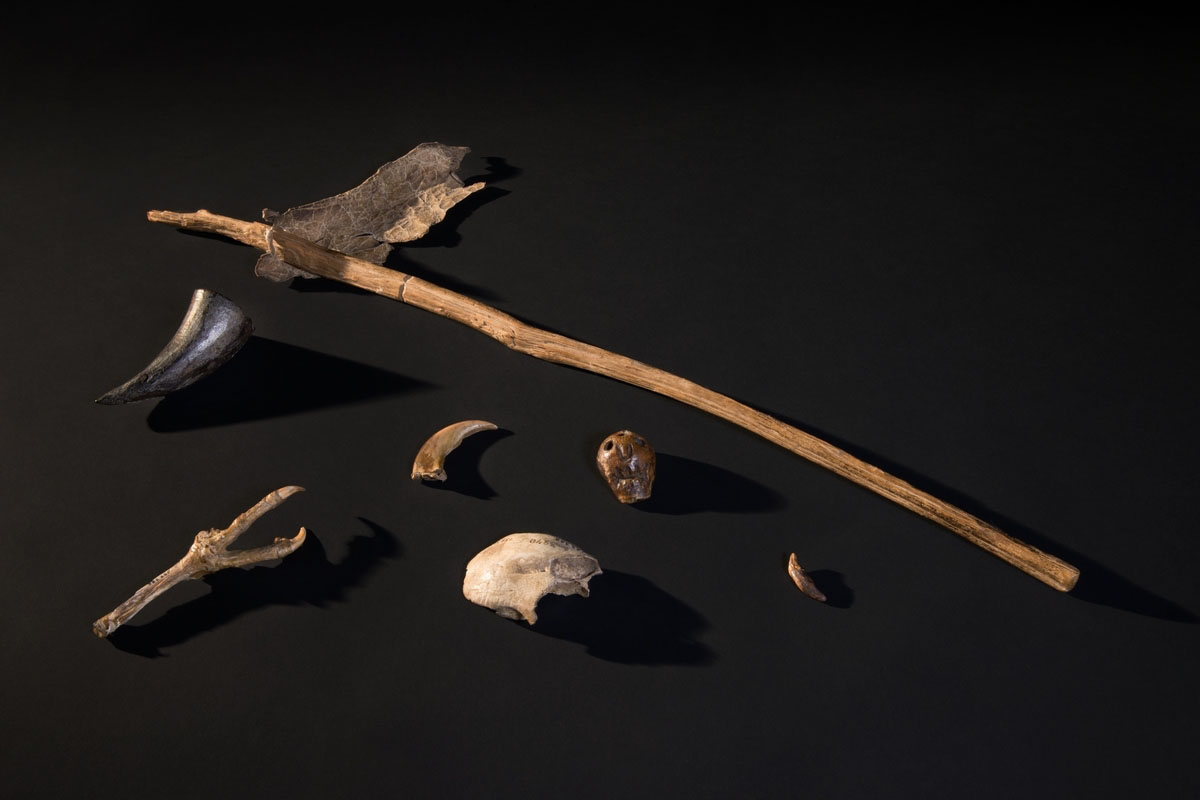
"Captain Elin's magical artifacts", which include a milk hare, a cow horn, a chicken claw, a skull, a bear claw, a piece of bone, and possibly a tooth.

A collection of items referred to as "Captain Elin's magical artifacts" was long stored at the Göta Court of Appeal in Jönköping but was transferred in 1864 to the Swedish History Museum and in 1926 to the Nordic Museum. According to tradition, these belonged to Captain Elin, though they likely originated from several separate witch trials.

It is believed that the skull attributed to "Captain Elin" actually belonged to another person, Anna Maria Adamsdotter (born circa 1680), who was of Romanisael (Traveler) heritage. Her case, also involving witchcraft, was handled by the Göta Court of Appeal. The skull matches descriptions and is likely one of the oldest objects connected to Romani history worldwide.
