= Gävle Boy =

Executed Swedish child (1663–1676)

Johan Johansson (1663 – November 1676), usually known as the Gävle Boy, was a young Swedish boy remembered for being a witness in witch trials and for bearing substantial responsibility for the Katarina witch trials in 1676.

== Background ==
Johan was the son of a shoemaker Johan Davidsson (d. 1672) in the city of Gävle in Gästrikland. He came to live with relatives in Stockholm in 1675 at the age of twelve, after having orphaned himself by having his widowed mother Karin Nilsdotter Griis executed, claiming she had abducted him to the sabbath of Satan in Blockula (Blåkulla) where she had molested him sexually.

== Inspiring a witch hunt ==
In Stockholm, he became known as the crown witness from Gävle and everyone wanted to hear about his visits to Blockula. He told them many stories about the sabbath of Satan, each more fantastic and exciting than the last, and gathered more and more people around him, including adults, and was soon a real celebrity and regarded as an expert on witches and sorcery. When people asked him if he had seen anything suspicious in Stockholm, he hinted that he had. He became regarded as an expert on witches and abductions to Blockula; adults consulted him, and he could faint and pretend to be attacked by witches publicly.

Soon, other children and teenagers, inspired by his stories, began to claim that they had been abducted and taken to Satan too, and the parents in the congregation of Catharina (Katarina) became worried. A witch-hysteria broke out, and the parents began to gather their children in houses where they could watch over them and protect them from being abducted. After one of these nights, when they thought themselves to have been attacked by the witches, the priest of the congregation gave the mayor a petition signed by the parents, imploring the authorities to investigate to protect their children.

== Before the court ==
During the proceedings, the Gävle Boy and other children were interrogated. When the Gävle Boy was questioned, he suddenly changed his testimony; it was not the witch Brita Zippel who had abducted him and the two teenage maids of Myra, Annika and Agnes but himself. During his mother's execution, "her spirit" fell over him, and he had thereafter been a witch, and was able to transform himself into Brita Zippel and take children to Blockula himself. He was then sentenced to be decapitated and burned as a witch, though this sentence seems to have been meant as a way to keep him away; the secular authorities did not wish for a witch trial in Stockholm.

== Followers ==
But now a special witch commission was created to examine and try witches, and many women were tried and executed on the strength of the testimonies of children who claimed to have been abducted and taken to Satan by them. The Gävle Boy had started all this, and the children were now led by the teenage girls Lisbeth Carlsdotter and the maids of Myra, Annika and Agnes. During all this, the Gävle Boy was asked by the court if the Devil was upset and he testified that he was.

During all these events, the Gävle Boy was described as triumphant; he was not afraid, not even when he was sentenced to death, but seemed happy to be the center of attention. He was not insane or stupid; rather he was intelligent, but he was most likely a mythomaniac.

== Exposure ==
After the execution of Malin Matsdotter, however, the judges began to change their means of interrogation: until this point, they had written down the children's testimony during the first interrogation, and during the trial simply asked them to confirm it. Now, they instead asked the children to repeat their testimony, and they were horrified when they discovered that all of the testimonies changed each time, including the Gävle Boy's. During these trials, the children, forced to repeat their testimonies, broke down under the new pressure. When one of the accused witches, Margareta Remmer, who had challenged the social order by, as a poor orphan, marrying the wealthy Captain Remmer, asked the testifying girl: "Think, girl, was that really what you saw? This is a question of my life", the girl broke down.

Lisbeth Carlsdotter and the Maids of Myra had behaved in a manner which undermined their credibility in the eyes of the authorities; during an execution, Lisbeth Carlsdotter was overheard by many witnesses saying to the Maids of Myra: "If it were up to me, there would soon be only three women left in this city!" During a trial, she said: "Even the counts know who Lisbeth Carlsdotter is - who the hell are you?", and during one testimony, she made the mistake of trying to accuse the Countess De la Gardie, Princess Maria Eufrosyne of Pfalz, aunt of the King and wife of the Lord High Chancellor Magnus Gabriel De la Gardie, and her sister-in-law countess Maria Sofia De la Gardie, of witchcraft. Accusations of that sort against such people could never be accepted, and the result was the destruction of her credibility as a witness.

Many of the witnesses began to say that they had been told what to say by the Gävle Boy, by Lisbeth Carlsdotter and by the Maids of Myra.

== Aftermath ==
This was the end of the witch trials throughout all Sweden; in 1677, the government ordered the priests in the country to end all accusations of sorcery by declaring that the country was henceforth and forever purged from witches. The rest of the accused witches in Stockholm were set free, and the judges decided that the child-witnesses should be whipped and the leading witnesses, the teenaged maids of Myra, should be executed for false testimony. The Gävle Boy, all the time in prison awaiting execution, should still be executed, no longer for sorcery, but for false testimony.

The Gävle boy was executed by hanging at the age of thirteen in November 1676, followed by Lisbeth Carlsdotter and the maids of Myra on December 20, 1676.

== See also ==
- Leicester boy
- Gertrud Svensdotter
- Abigail Williams
