= Urban Hjärne =

Swedish chemist

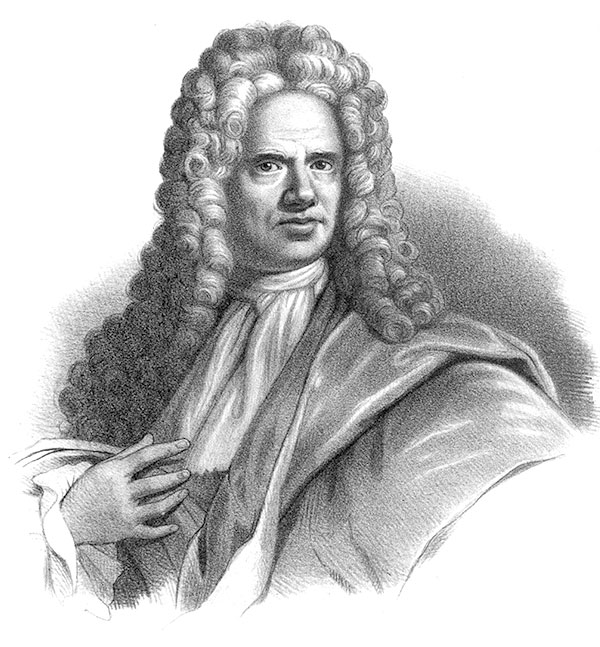
Urban Hjärne

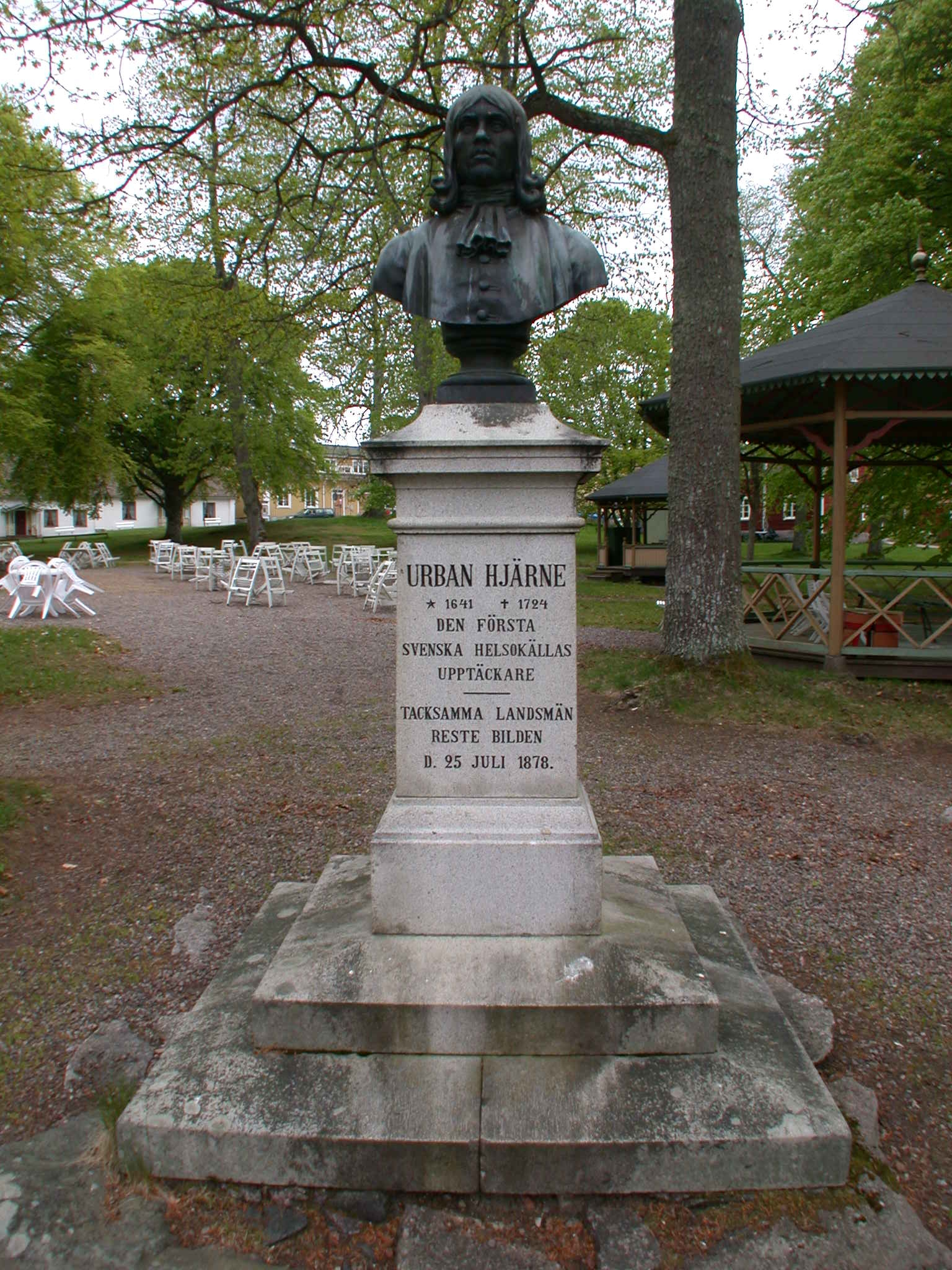
Urban Hjärne bust

Urban Hjärne (20 December 1641 – 10 March 1724) was a Swedish chemist, geologist, physician and writer.

== Biography ==
He was born at Skworitz near Nyenschantz in Swedish Ingria. He was the son of vicar Erlandus Jonæ Hiærne (1596–1654) and Christina Tomasdotter Schmidt (1615–1682).

He was admitted in 1655 to the high school gymnasium in Dorpat. He went to Arva, where he studied until 1657. He entered Uppsala University in 1658. He began his medical education at Uppsala in 1661. For several years he visited Northern Europe's leading research center for medicine. He travelled to the Netherlands, England and France. In 1670, he became a doctor of medicine at Angers, France. In 1674 he settled as a physician in Stockholm where his practice primarily served the aristocracy.

In 1669 he was elected a Fellow of the Royal Society. He was appointed first physician to the King Charles XI of Sweden in 1684 and was ennobled in 1689. He became assessor of the Board of Mines (Bergskollegium) in 1675. He became head of the Laboratorium Chemicum in 1683.

He was also the author of Stratonice, sometimes claimed to be the first Swedish novel, a partly autobiographical romance of seduction begun in 1665 and published in several parts, completed in 1668.

In Sweden, Urban Hjärne is also known for his fight against witch trials. He was a member of the Witchcraft Commission in the Katarina witch trials during the Great noise in 1676, and is remembered as one of the members of the commission who started to feel scepticism toward witchraft and doubt the child witnesses, leading to the witnesses to be exposed as liars and the dissolution of the Katarina witch trials, the Witchcraft Commission, and ultimately the entire witch hunt.

== Personal life ==
He built a research library of 3,500 books, one of the largest in Sweden. He married three times: first Maria Svahn, then Catharina Elisabeth Bergenhielm, and finally Elisabeth Carlsdotter. He died in Stockholm in 1724 and was buried at Bromma Church.

== Other sources ==
- "Library and Archive". Royal Society.
