= Elin i Horsnäs =

Alleged Swedish witch

Elin i Horsnäs (died after 28 September 1611) was an alleged Swedish witch, the most famous witch in Sweden before the great witch-mania of 1668–1676, and one of few witches in Sweden to be executed before 1668. Her trial is also the most documented trial of sorcery in Sweden before 1668.

== First accusations ==
Elin was a widow who lived in Småland in the beginning of the 17th century. She had long been considered a witch, and there were many stories about her. In 1591, a woman, Maretta Laressa, argued with her and called her a witch, and Elin slapped her in front of several witnesses; Maretta died shortly after.

She was accused of sorcery for the first time in 1599 or 1601. The executioner Håkan put her through the ordeal by water together with two other women, whose names are unknown. She passed the test, sank and was acquitted, but the other two women were convicted and executed. It is believed that she bribed Håkan, and in view of the later events, it is seen as likely that she bribed him with sexual favours. She was set free, but although acquitted from the charges, the suspicions continued.

== Håkan the witch hunter ==
The real witch-hunt was not to break out in Sweden until 1668, but Småland was a bit of an exception, and it is believed that in the beginning of the 17th century there were several, though badly documented, witch trials in Småland that included both the ordeal by water and torture. The reason for this is considered to be the executioner Håkan, who was the official executioner of Jönköping between 1588 and 1638; he claimed to be an expert on this subject. It seems that he was educated abroad, learning about the ordeals by water, the devil's mark and the torture used in witch trials in other countries. In the first year of his employment, a woman who was set free from charges of sorcery, was threatened that if she was ever accused again, Håkan would expose her to the ordeal by water; two years later, he performed this test on two women in Jönköping - possibly the first time this method was used in Sweden - and in 1594, he was highly recommended for having exposed a woman called "German-billa" and making her admit to sorcery.

This was during the period when the country didn't have a witch-law; when the first real witch trials occurred in Sweden in the 1590s, they were uncertain about how to handle them, as the old medieval law about sorcery considered it a very small crime, a crime which had nothing to do with the Devil and which was only punishable if it led to someone's death. These first trials are badly documented, but few of them led to a death sentence - most of those accused before 1608, such as Kristin of Hultaby in 1604 and Karin Månsdotter in 1605, were either cleared of the charges, or, if judged guilty, whipped rather than executed. But in 1608, Sweden passed a law about witchcraft founded on the Bible which made sorcery punishable by death, and it was after this law was passed that Elin once again was accused and put on trial.

== Second accusation ==
In 1611, Elin was put on trial in Sunnerbo, and Håkan was called upon to expose this famous witch, ten years after their first encounter. It is not known how old Elin was, but in 1611, her mother was still alive, her sister was engaged to be married and her son was in his teens (probably his younger teens, as he was considered as a child), so she could not have been an old woman.

She was then remarried to Oluffz. She was accused of a long list of charges; she had practised love-magic on the fiancee of her sister, Simon Thuresson, when he contemplated breaking off the engagement; she had murdered both her first husband Niels Pedersson and Maretta Laressa by use of magic; she had made cattle sick by sorcery and then taken money to make them healthy again, and she had used enchanted hares to suck milk out of other people's cattle and bring it to her. She had had an argument with her former father-in-law, (the father of her first husband), in which he accused her of having murdered his son for the inheritance, and made her former brother-in-law sick when he tried to make peace between them. Witnesses claimed that during a wedding, her son had told the other boys that one of the birds in the sky above them was his mother, and that bird had come to him every time he called upon it.

The court had received so many accusations and complaints against Elin from her neighbours during the years that they were tired of it and finally decided to accept the accusations and put her on trial once more.

== The witch trial ==
Elin denied the charges. Unlike other married women, she did not have her husband speak for her, but conducted her own defense. It was permitted for married women to be absent from court and have their husbands speak for them instead, which often had very good results, but apparently, Elin's husband was not allowed to defend her, possibly because the charges were so unusually many.

The bailiff of Sunnberbo had asked for the assistance of Håkan from the governor in Jönköping, and he arrived with permission to perform the ordeal by water. The court was allowed to judge her, but not to execute her without approval from the higher court. The sheriff told Håkan, "If you find Elin not guilty, you will leave her be. You will receive payment all the same." Håkan answered him, "If I am not allowed to deal with her as I do with those of her kind, then by the devil I will have her on the water."

When Håkan observed her, in secret "to avoid her evil eye", he claimed she had the Devil's mark under her right breast. He had asked to observe her without her knowing it, before she was told that he had been hired to perform the investigation, and he claimed that he saw the mark under her breast despite the fact that she was fully clothed at the occasion. This is regarded as a strong indication that he had seen her naked before, and that he had helped her to pass the test during the first trial because he had been bribed with sexual favors; had she known he was there, she could have revealed this.

When some women were hired to examine her, they found he was right; the women claimed that they had never seen any woman with a mark like that before, and that they certainly did not have such a mark on their breasts.

She was again exposed to the ordeal by water, and this time, she did not pass; when she was brought up from the water, she immediately said that if she had just been able to prepare herself, she knew a way to pass the test and would have passed it. Håkan ordered her head to be shaved, as was done in Germany with witches, and was then allowed to torture her. She never admitted being a witch despite the torture, but eventually she admitted to having used arsenic to murder her first husband. It was said that she gave this admission without having been asked.

Elin was sentenced to death by decapitation on 28 September 1611 and she was beheaded "after the unanimous cry" from the church, the court and all the public. The exact date and the method of the execution does not seem to have been documented.

Master Håkan continued with his persecution of witches until his death in 1638; he handled the trials of Britta Arfvidsdotter in 1616 and Ingeborg Boggesdotter in 1618, who were both executed for sorcery in 1619. In 1615, the judge of the trial against Elin was questioned by the authorities, as it was questioned whether the trial had been proper, which has made the trial of Elin perhaps most well documented witch trial in Sweden outside of the period of the great witch hunt of 1668-1676.
