= Blockula =

Devil's secret island in Swedish legend

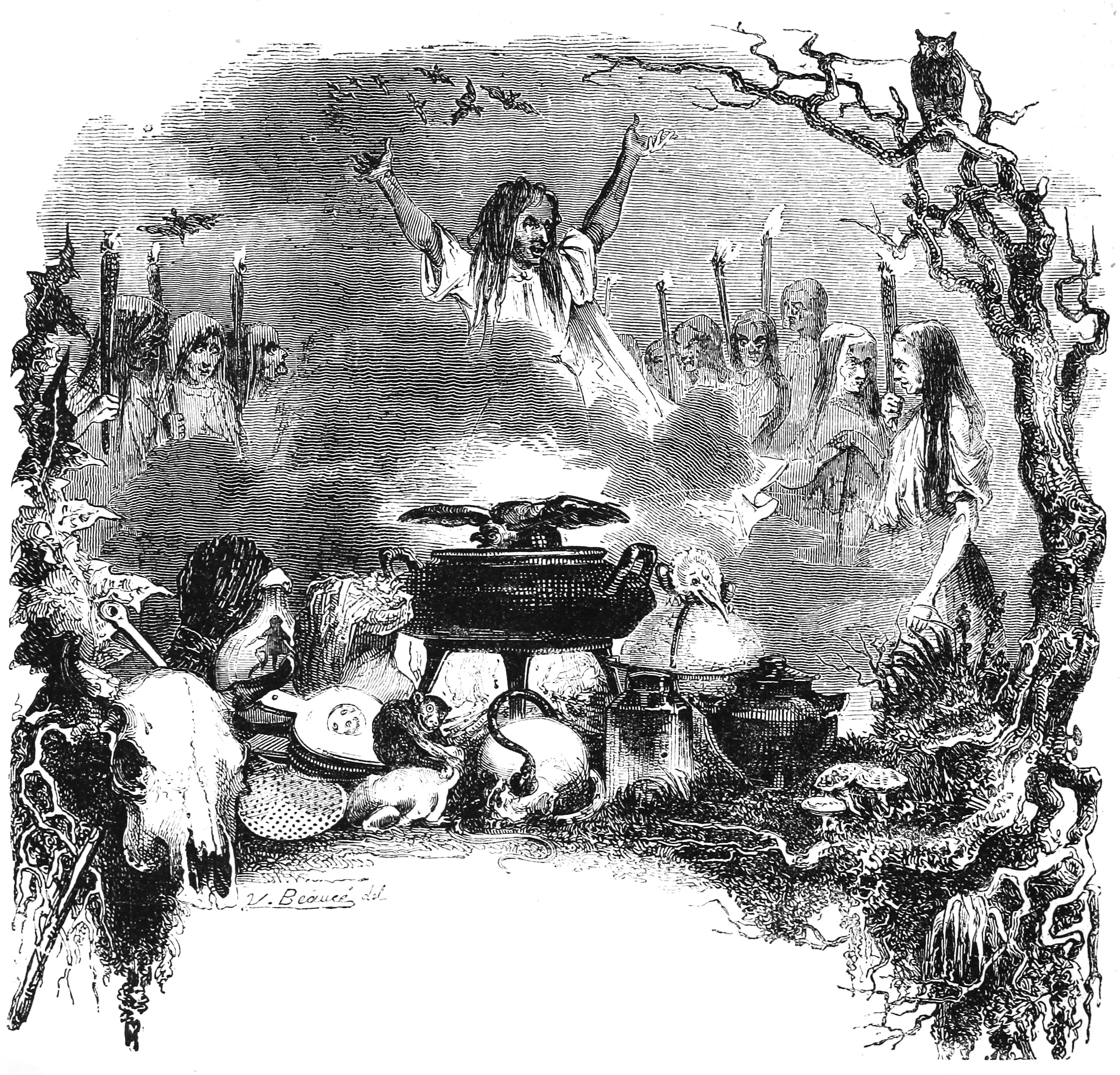
Blockula in the Dictionnaire Infernal

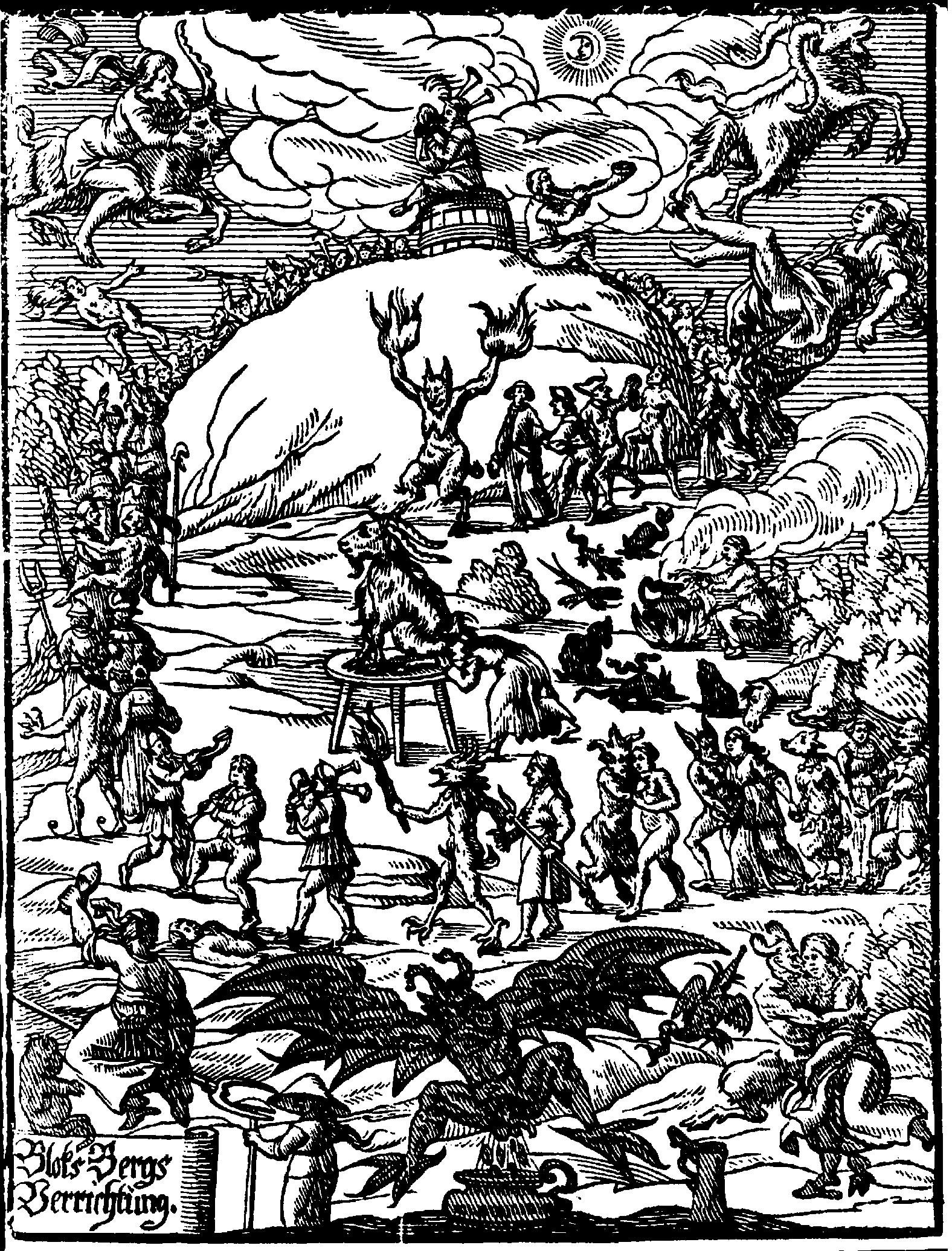
Witches' Sabbath at the Blocksberg, Johannes Praetorius, Leipzig, 1668

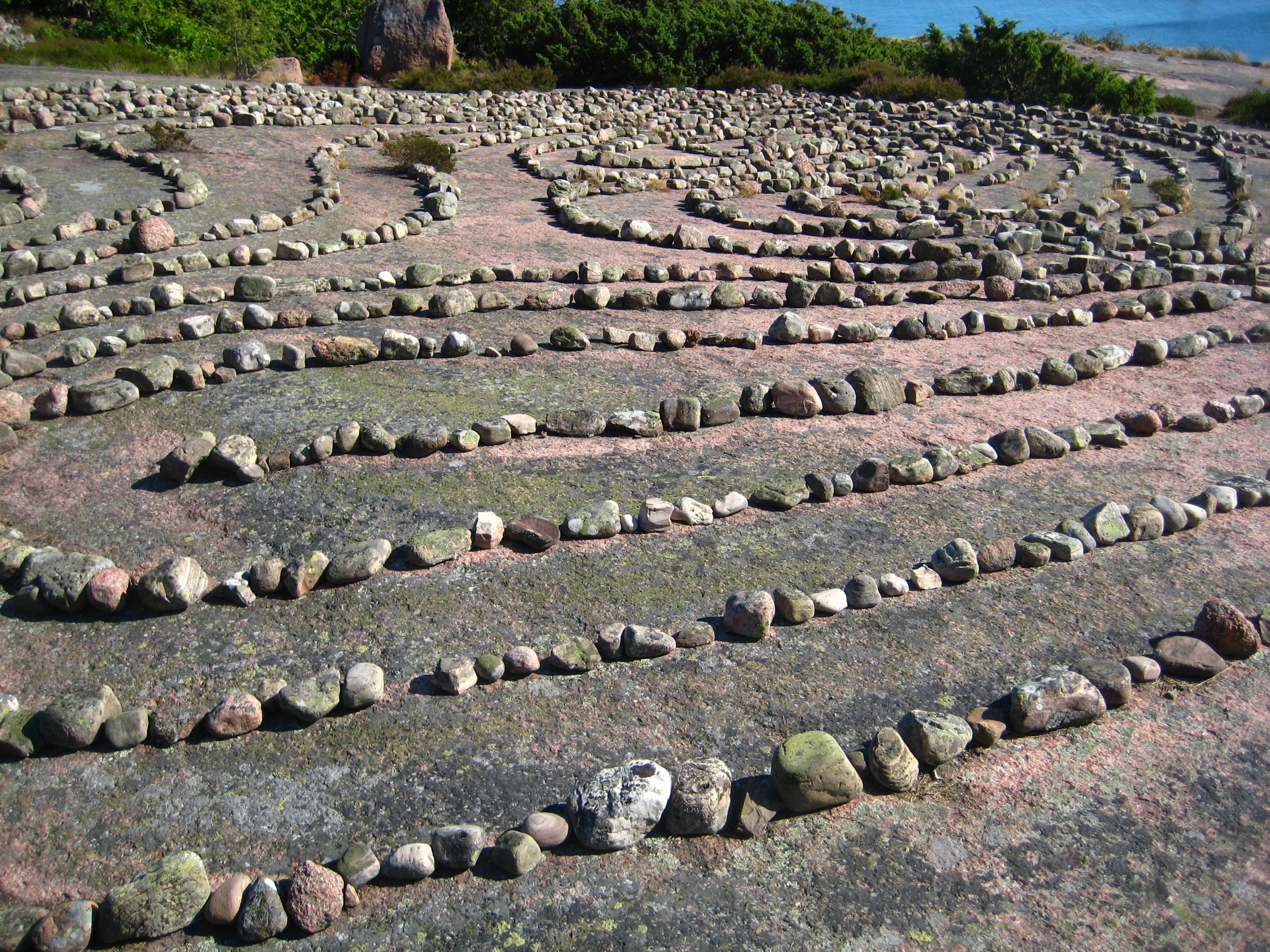
Detail of the stone labyrinth on the Swedish islet of Blå Jungfrun

Blockula (Swedish: Blåkulla, lit. 'blue hill') was a legendary island where the Devil held his Earthly court during a witches' Sabbath. It was described as containing a massive meadow with no visible end, and a large house where the Devil would stay.

Referencing Blockula nights, witches described the Devil as appearing, "in a gray Coat, and red and blue Stockings: He had a red Beard, a high-crown’d Hat, with Linnen of divers Colours, wrapt about it, and long Garters upon his Stockings."

Blockula plays a major part in the witch-hunts described in Joseph Glanvill's 1682 work Sadducismus Triumphatus, which detailed the Mora witch trials in an Appendix entitled: "True Account of What Happen’d in the Kingdom of Sweden In the Years 1669, 1670, and upwards: In Relation to some Persons that were accused for Witches; and Tryed and Executed By the King's Command."

Blockula is originally the same place as the island Blå Jungfrun, which was in old days called Blåkulla, and since medieval days rumored to be a place where the witches gathered. The perhaps first time Blockula was mentioned in a witch trial by an alleged witch was in 1597, but in reality, it was not until the Swedish witch mania of 1668–1676 that the place had any real importance in the persecution of witches.

== Preparation and travel ==
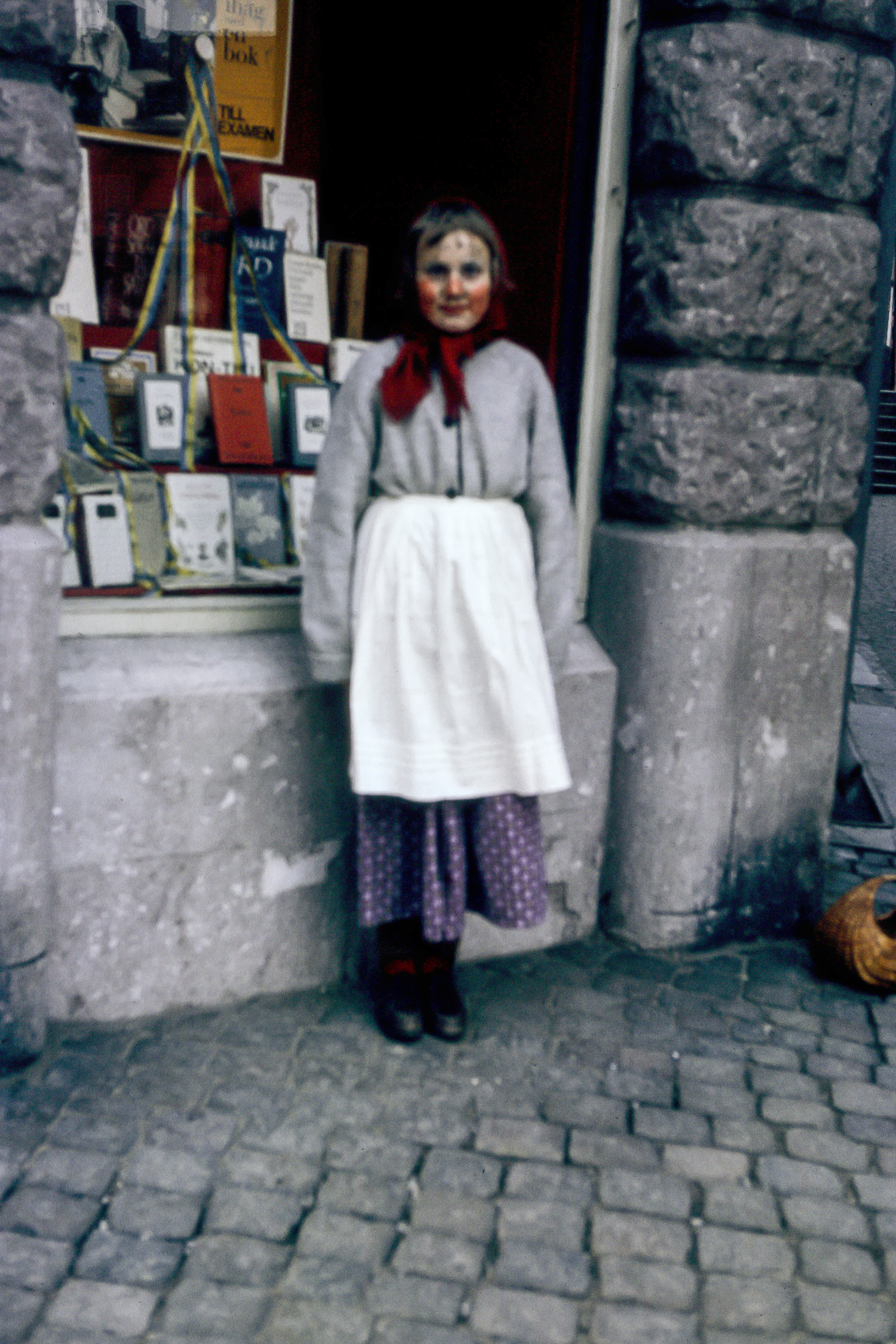
A girl dressed up as an Easter witch

Blockula could only be reached by magical flight, wherein witches and the taken children would ride fence-posts, spits, beasts (such as horses or goats) or even the bodies of sleeping men; one example claims that when room was lacking, a spit would be placed into the back-side of a goat, to increase the riding area. Children would be convinced to perform the ride after being given "a Shirt, a Coat and a Doublet, which was either Red or Blew", and being asked if they wanted to attend a faraway feast; if they did not accept the invitation they would be forcibly brought along, regardless.

== Island structure and ceremonies ==
They unanimously confessed, that Blockula is situated in a delicate large Meadow, whereof you can see no end. The place or House they met at, had before it a Gate painted with divers colours; through this Gate they went into a little Meadow distinct from the other, where the Beasts went, that they used to ride on : But the Men whom they made use of in their Journey, stood in the House by the Gate in a slumbering Posture, sleeping against the Wall.

The events of the night were started by having each witch cut their finger to sign the Devil's book in blood, and undergoing a mock baptism in which they swear their soul to the Devil.

In a huge large Room of this House they said, there stood a very long Table, at which the Witches did sit down : And that hard by this Room was another Chamber, where there were very lovely and delicate Beds.

The Devil's most esteemed witches would sit closest to him, at the head of the table, whereas the children would stand by the door. Some children, however, are recorded as claiming the existence of "a white Angel" stationed near the door, reminding them to keep the Lord's Commandments and occasionally attempting to block children's entrance into the room.

The Diet they did use to have there, was, they said, Broth with Colworts and Bacon in it, Oatmeal, Bread spread with Butter, Milk, and Cheese. And they added, that sometimes it tasted very well, and sometimes very ill.

After the meal, festivities included dancing, but would commonly descend into cursing, fighting, and other vulgarities. Certain parts of the house and field, however, were devoted to more specific ceremonies.

Those of Elfdale confessed, That the Devil used to play upon an Harp before them, and afterwards to go with them that he liked best, into a Chamber, where he committed Venerous Acts with them; and this indeed all confessed, That he had carnal knowledge of them, and that the Devil had Sons and Daughters by them, which he did Marry together, and they did couple together, and brought forth Toads and Serpents.

If he hath a mind to be merry with them, he lets them all ride upon Spits before him; takes afterwards the Spits and beats them black and blew, and then laughs at them. And he bids them believe, that the day of Judgment will come speedily, and therefore sets them on work to build a great House of Stone, promising, that in that House he will preserve them from God's fury, and cause them to enjoy the greatest delights and pleasures : But while they work exceeding hard at it, there falls a great part of the Wall down again, whereby some of the Witches are commonly hurt, which makes him laugh, but presently he cures them again.

They said, they had seen sometimes a very great Devil like a Dragon, with Fire found about him, and bound with an Iron Chain; and the Devil that converses with them tells them, that if they confess any thing, he will let that great Devil loose upon them, whereby all Swedeland shall come into great danger.

An island church is also mentioned, but with no other information about appearance or purpose.

== Aftermath and effects ==
Blockula was written to be harmful and physically damaging to the children taken.

After this usage the Children are exceeding weak; and if any be carried over Night, they cannot recover themselves the next day; and they often fall into fits, the coming of which they know by an extraordinary paleness that seizes on the Children, and if a Fit comes upon them, they lean on their Mother's Arms, who sit up with them sometimes all Night; and when they observe the Paleness coming, shake the Children, but to no purpose.

They observe farther, That their Childrens Breasts grow cold at such times; and they take sometimes a burning Candle and stick it in their Hair, which yet is not burnt by it. They Swoon upon this paleness, which Swoon lasteth sometime half an Hour, sometimes an Hour, sometimes two Hours, and when the Children come to themselves again, they mourn and lament, and groan most miserably, and beg exceedingly to be eased.

== Modern traditions ==
In Sweden and Finland, to commemorate the travel of witches to Blåkulla, children dress as witches, old women and old men on Easter and go door-to-door for treats similar to the trick-or-treating tradition of halloween. The children sometimes present hand-made cards and other greetings. In the Stockholm rave and club scene, Blockula, who take inspiration from the Blockula mythologies, is one of the biggest organizers of youth rave culture.

== See also ==
- Akelarre (witchcraft)
- The Brocken
- Domen, Norway
- Kyöpelinvuori
- Märet Jonsdotter
- Mora witch trial
- Witches of Benevento
- Bald Mountain (folklore)
