= Protests against early modern witch trials =

Throughout the era of the European witch trials in the Early Modern period, from the 15th to the 18th century, there were protests against both the belief in witches and the trials. Even those protestors who believed in witchcraft were typically skeptical about its actual occurrence.

== Forms of protest ==
=== Legal ===
Various objections to the witch hunts were raised on the basis of their abuses of the law. Andrea Alciato (1515) and Johann Weyer (1563) both objected that torture could lead to false confessions. Johann Georg Gödelmann (1591) objected to legal abuses and improper methods of trial, while Friedrich Spee (1631) argued that there was no empirical evidence for allegations of witchcraft, even self-confessed. In 1635 the Roman Inquisition acknowledged that "the Inquisition has found scarcely one trial conducted legally". In the middle of the 17th century, the difficulty in proving witchcraft according to legal process contributed to the councilors of Rothenburg ob der Tauber (German), following advice to treat witchcraft cases with caution. In 1652 jurist Georg Christoph Walther advised the Rothenburg council in the case of two women accused of witchcraft, insisting that unless the women could be found guilty by proper due legal procedure they should be released without punishment.

=== Ethical ===
Anton Praetorius (1598) and Johann Matthäus Meyfart (1635) objected to the witch hunts on the basis of the cruelty with which they were carried out.

In Catalonia, in January 1619, the Jesuit Pere Gil delivered a document to the Spanish viceroy to Catalonia Francisco Fernández de la Cueva, 7th Duke of Alburquerque against the witch hunt. Following the arrest of Caterina Freixa on 8 November 1619, between 1619 and 1622, a widespread debate opened between supporters of hunting and its opponents after fourteen prestigious Catalan jurists linked to Generalitat de Catalunya (among them Joan Pere Fontanella) signed a document in defence of Caterina Freixa's innocence to try to avoid her death sentence, marking the beginning of the end of witch hunt in Catalonia.

=== Theological ===
Martin LeFranc (1440) objected that witchcraft could not take place in reality due to the sovereignty of God, and that even witches who confessed to witchcraft were being deceived by illusions of the devil. LeFranc blamed the clergy for permitting such beliefs to flourish. Antonino, Archbishop of Florence (1384–1459), insisted that common beliefs concerning witches were mere foolishness, and required those who held such beliefs to make confession and repent of them. Ulrich Müller, writing as "Molitoris" (1489), believed in witchcraft but opposed common beliefs on the subject on the basis of the theological arguments of the Canon Episcopi. Gianfrancesco Ponzinibio (1520) extended this argument to deny the reality of all diabolical witchcraft. Reginald Scot (1584) put forward similar arguments and cited John Calvin numerous times. Cornelius Loos (1592) claimed that belief in witchcraft was mere superstition.

=== Skeptical ===
Skeptical protests took a number of forms; scientific, medical, or attribution of alleged sorcery to fraud.

Some medical practitioners insisted that the apparent evidence for witchcraft had medical causes, rather than supernatural. The physician Symphorien Champier (c.1500) believed that many reports of alleged witchcraft could be explained by means of medical conditions. Bishop Antonio Venegas de Figueroa (1540) cautioned against confusing witchcraft with mental illness. When French surgeon Pierre Pigray (1589) was asked by the Parliament to examine several people accused of being witches, he dismissed the allegations on the basis that the accused were deluded and in need of medical care. Physician Johannes Weyer (1563) argued that women accused of being witches were suffering from an imbalance of the humors, resulting from the devil's interference, and viewed their beliefs as imaginary. Weyer's approach has been considered a precursor to modern psychiatric methods.

Accusations of witchcraft, especially by traveling witchfinders, were sometimes opposed by locals whose skepticism of profiteering witchfinders was stronger than their belief in witches. In 1460 a Frenchman named Asseline (also known as Jehan de la Case) was assaulted by "Master Jehan" with a spear. Asseline had angered Jehan (a witchfinder) by opposing his claims that two of Asseline's relatives were witches. In a later fight Asseline struck Jehan fatally with a halberd. Local people, skeptical of Jehan's claims, successfully petitioned the king to have Asseline pardoned, insisting that Jehan had been a fraud.

Skeptical objections were raised in a range of ways. Samuel de Cassini (c. 1505) objected to witchcraft on logical grounds. Andrea Alciato was skeptical of allegations of witchcraft, which he said was more easily believed by theologians than jurors. Heinrich Cornelius Agrippa (1519) believed that witchcraft was merely superstitious delusion. Montaigne (1580) objected to witchcraft on the basis of skepticism concerning the trustworthiness of the senses. The skeptic Samuel Harsnett (1599) rejected all belief in witches.

== See also ==
- Christina Rauscher
