= Histoire de l'Inquisition en France =

1829 book by Étienne-Léon de Lamothe-Langon

Histoire de l'Inquisition en France is a book about witch trials in the early modern period published in 1829 by Étienne-Léon de Lamothe-Langon (1786–1864), supposedly on the basis of his unprecedented access to Church archives in Toulouse, granted by one Bishop Antoine Pascal Hyacinthe Sermet. It is now regarded as a forgery.

The dramatic and blood curdling accounts of Histoire were incorporated as a primary source into many other volumes, notably Joseph Hansen's (1862–1943) German Quellen und Untersuchungen zur Geschichte des Hexenwahns und der Hexenverfolgung im Mittelalter ("Sources and investigations regarding the history of the witch craze and the witch hunts in the Middle Ages"), which in turn became the source for many other works. Ultimately, Lamothe-Langon's work became the sole or principal primary source for a substantial part of twentieth century popular and historical beliefs about the Inquisition, witchcraft, torture, and jurisprudence in the Middle Ages.

In the early 1970s, the historians Norman Cohn and Richard Kieckhefer independently discovered that the Histoire was a fabrication; Lamothe-Langon's archive did not exist, he did not have the paleographic skills to read books of that age, several major events he described could not have occurred, and his book was full of anachronisms.

Prior to fabricating the Histoire, Lamothe-Langon had been an author of gothic horror novels. Subsequently, he went on to forge several autobiographies of French historical figures.
