= Anna Simonsdotter Hack =

Anna "Annika" Simonsdotter Hack (1621 – 5 August 1676), known as "Tysk-Annika" ("German-Annika"), was a Swedish businesswoman. She was one of the people accused of witchcraft in the Katarina witch trials during the witch hunt known as the Great noise, which took place in Sweden in 1668–1676.

== Life ==
Anna Simonsdotter Hack was born in Anklam in Western Pomerania in Germany to the stonemason Simon Hake (1605–1672) and Anna Koltzow. She emigrated to Sweden with her father sometime before 1637. She was married twice and had three children, two sons and one daughter. She was widowed and married in her second marriage to the tailor Johan Gunnarsson, who were three years older than her eldest son. Simonsdotter Hack was a businesswoman in her own right, and made and sold her own beer commercially in her own sales shop. She has somewhat of a bad reputation because of the loud family arguments often overheard from her home which appears to took place primarily between herself and her children.

During the Katarina witch trials in 1676, she was accused of having abducted children to Witches' Sabbath in Blockula. On 28 April 1676, Simonsdotter Hack was charged and imprisoned. The Court noticed as an aggravating circumstance that there were a lot of loud arguments in her home, and that she was known to use a bad language during them.

=== Trial ===
During her trial, several child witnesses claimed to have been abducted by her to Blockula. She was also accused to have abducted her own children to Blockula. Adult kin of the children claimed to have been abducted were summoned. The priest Pontinus testified that she had taught his and his brother's children satanic prayers in Blockula. She was claimed to have taught the children prayers from black and red books, one of them beginning with "Watch over us Satan..."

Her own priest Bergius, however, testified that he had never seen anything to indicate that she was a witch and that she had performed all religious obligations of a good Christian. Her landlady and her maidservant were questioned, but none of them had anything worse to say about her than the fact that she did often scold her children. Her own family was summoned by the court to testify. Her husband testified in her favor and stated that he had never seen anything to indicate that his wife had practiced sorcery. Her children did not themselwes claim that she had taken them to Blockula, but other wittnesses claimed so, and her children were therefore summoned to testify. Her son Påål admitted that his mother had yelled at him and called him a brat of Satan; he acknowledged that the rumours that he had been abducted to Blockula were true, but he never claimed that it was his mother who had taken him there, and claimed that he could not identify the witch who had abducted him. Her daughter Catharina did not confirm the allegations that she had been abducted by her mother to Blockula; she did, however, testify that when she visited her mother in prison, her mother had told her that she deserved to be burned alive for her sins.

Simonsdotter Hack herself never admitted herself guilty of the allegations. She never claimed that she had visited the Witches' Sabbath, or that she had taken children there. However, while she never explicitly confessed her guilt, she behaved in the manner of a regretful sinner to such a degree during her imprisonment that the Witchcraft Commission took her behaviour as an admission of guilt.

The Witchcraft Commission took the testimony of her children very seriously, despite the fact that they never confirmed the allegations against their mother. Her son had admitted that his mother cursed and he had admitted that he had been taken to Blockula, even if he never claimed his mother had been responsible. Her daughter had testified that her mother had confessed to her in prison that she was a sinner who deserved to be burned alive for her sins. Anna Simonsdotter Hack herself acknowledged that she said this, but that it had only been because of the anxiety she experienced during her imprisonment. However, her penitent and regretful behaviour was interpreted as an indirect confession of guilt.

=== Sentence and execution ===
Simonsdotter Hack was sentenced guilty as charged. Her behaviour of humble regret before the court made a favorable impression on the Witchcraft Commission, who gave her a milder verdict then Malin Matsdotter, who had been trialed at the same time: Malin Matsdotter was sentenced to be burned alive, while Anna Simonsdotter Hack were given the customary sentence for witchcraft, which was to be decapitated prior to burning.

They were executed side by side on 4 August 1676. Anna Simonsdotter was described as full humility and respect on her execution: and though she did not directly say that she was guilty, she behaved as was expected of her, and "by her remorse, by her psalms, and by falling on her knees and lifting her head and her hands to the sky, confirmed the justice in the verdict and the justice in the world".

She and Malin Matsdotter were the last two people to be executed during the Katarina witch trials. After them, Dufvans Margareta and Karin Ambjörnsdotter did receive a death sentence, but the sentence were never carried out. On 11 September, the child witnesses were exposed as perjurers during the trial against Margareta Remmer, which resulted in the entire Katarina witch trials being dissolved. The witnesses were arrested for perjury, and all prisoners accused of witchcraft were freed.
