= The Witches (Hans Baldung) =

Woodcut by artist Hans Baldung

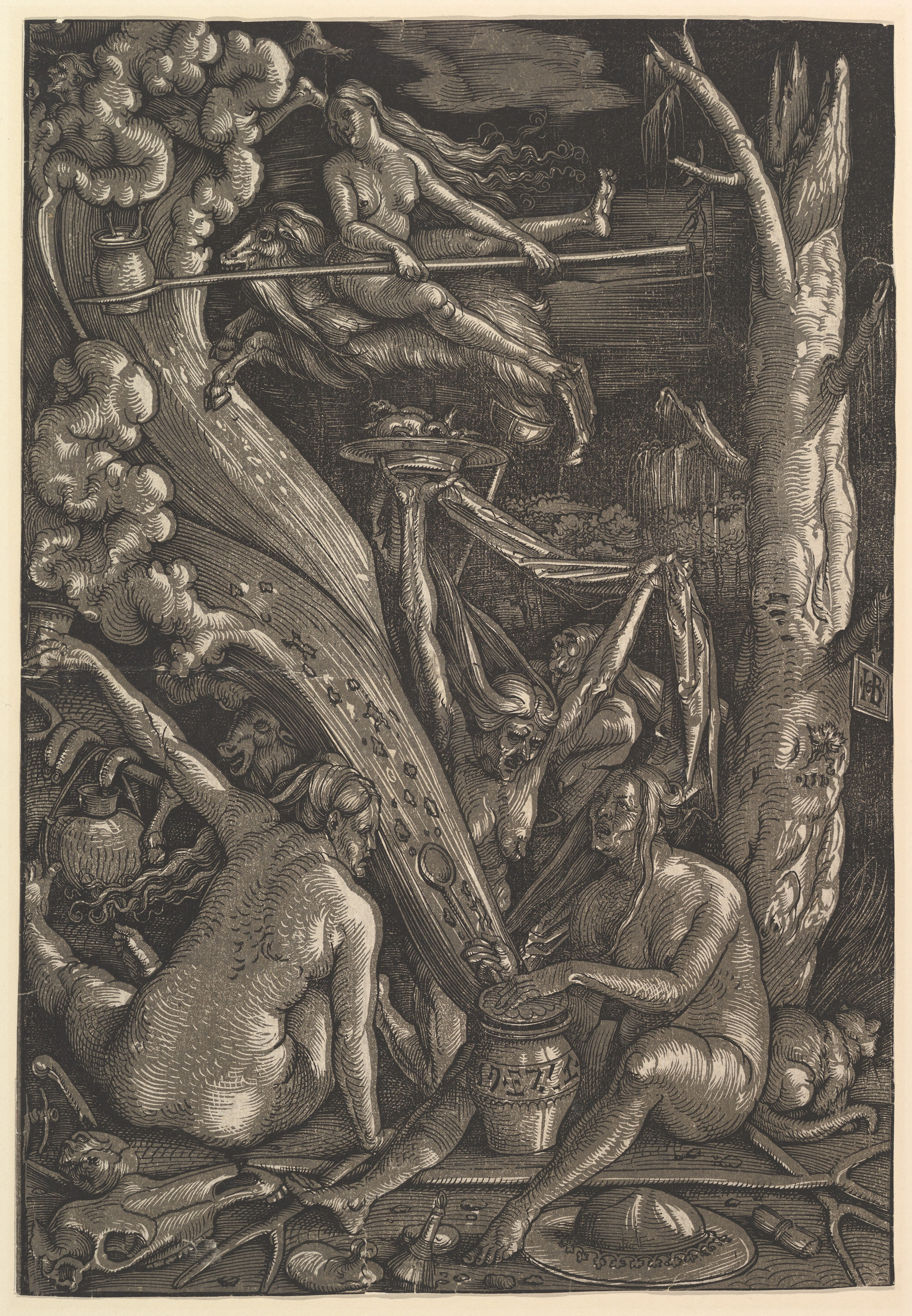
- Artist: Hans Baldung
- Year: 1510
- Medium: chiaroscuro woodcut
- Dimensions: 38.9 cm × 27 cm (15.3 in × 11 in)

The Witches (formerly titled The Witches' Sabbath) is a chiaroscuro woodcut by German Renaissance artist Hans Baldung. This woodcut depicts witches preparing to travel to a Witches' Sabbath by using flying ointment. This is the first woodcut produced by Baldung after leaving the studio of his mentor, Albrecht Dürer, and one of the first Renaissance images to depict both witches that fly and a Witches' Sabbath.

Surrounded by human bones and animal familiars, a group of witches engage in naked revelry as they soar through the air and prepare food for the Sabbath. The image also contains references to a blasphemy of mass and the witches' libidinous nature.

== Historical context ==
This print was created in the city of Strasbourg, where Hans Baldung was working. This is the first print made by Baldung after becoming a master craftsman and leaving Dürer's workshop, as well as the first to feature his initials. These initials can be seen hanging on a tree limb to the center-right edge of the print.

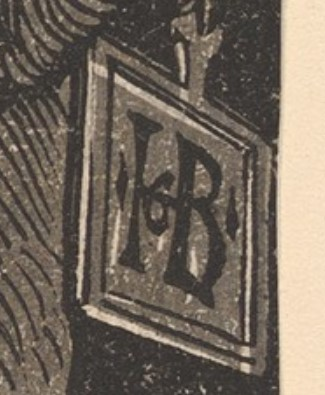
Hans Baldung's monogram, "HB."

The chiaroscuro woodcut was a printmaking technique where a color woodblock was used to add tone to the printed image. It was invented earlier in 1508 and had already seen success in the prints of Lucas Cranach the Elder and Hans Burgkmair. This new technology allowed for Baldung's scene to be set at night. This print was made from two woodblocks, one key block for black lines and a color block. There are two versions of The Witches, one printed with an orange tone-block and another with a gray-tone block.

Baldung and his mentor Albrecht Dürer created several images throughout their careers that dealt with this theme of witches. Notable works include Dürer's The Four Witches (1497) and Witch Riding Backwards On A Goat (1500), as well as Baldung's New Year's Greeting with Three Witches (1514) and The Bewitched Groom (1544). It is unknown if the 1506 drawing Hexensabbat by Albrecht Altdorfer influenced Baldung's print.

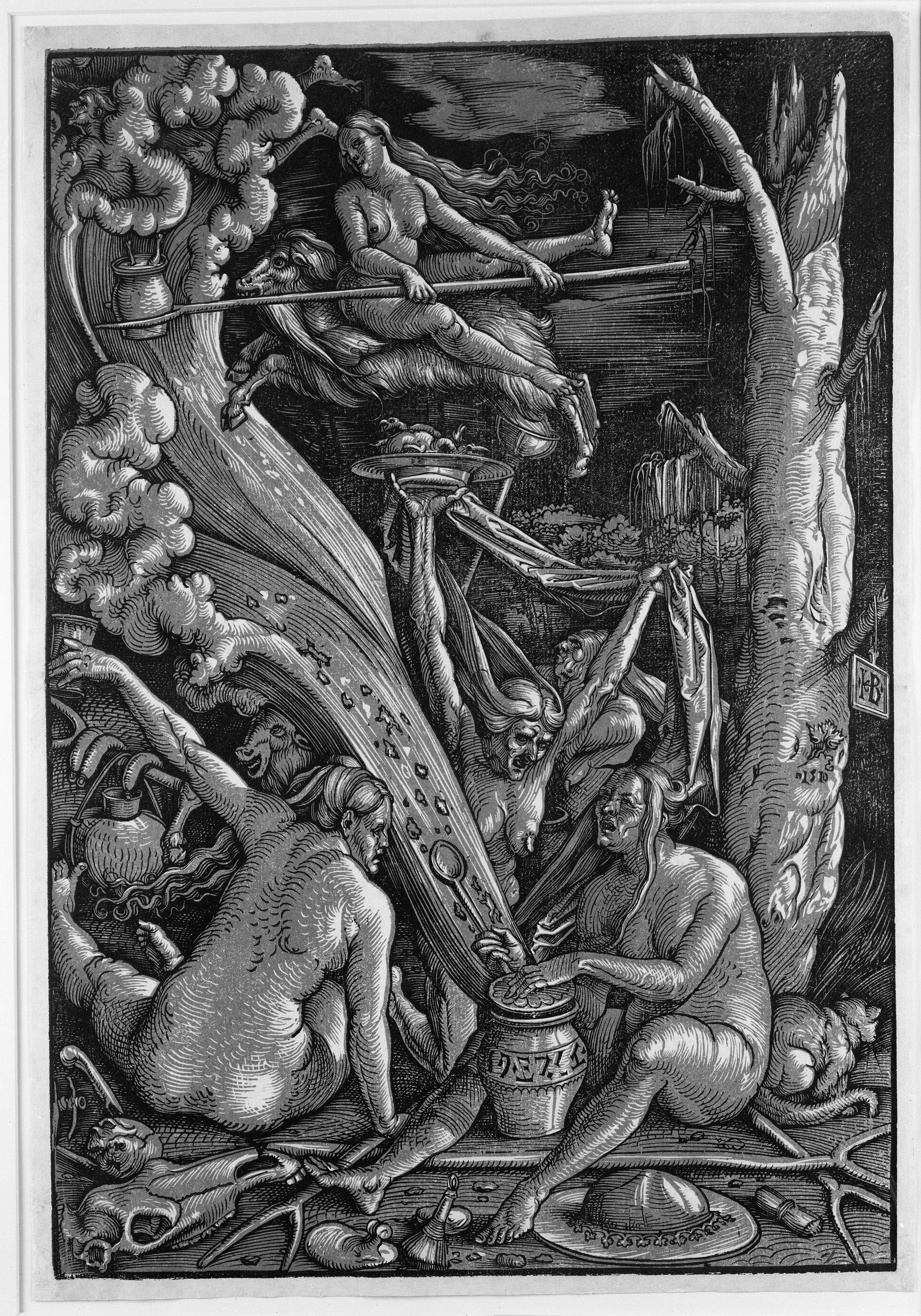
The gray-toned print.

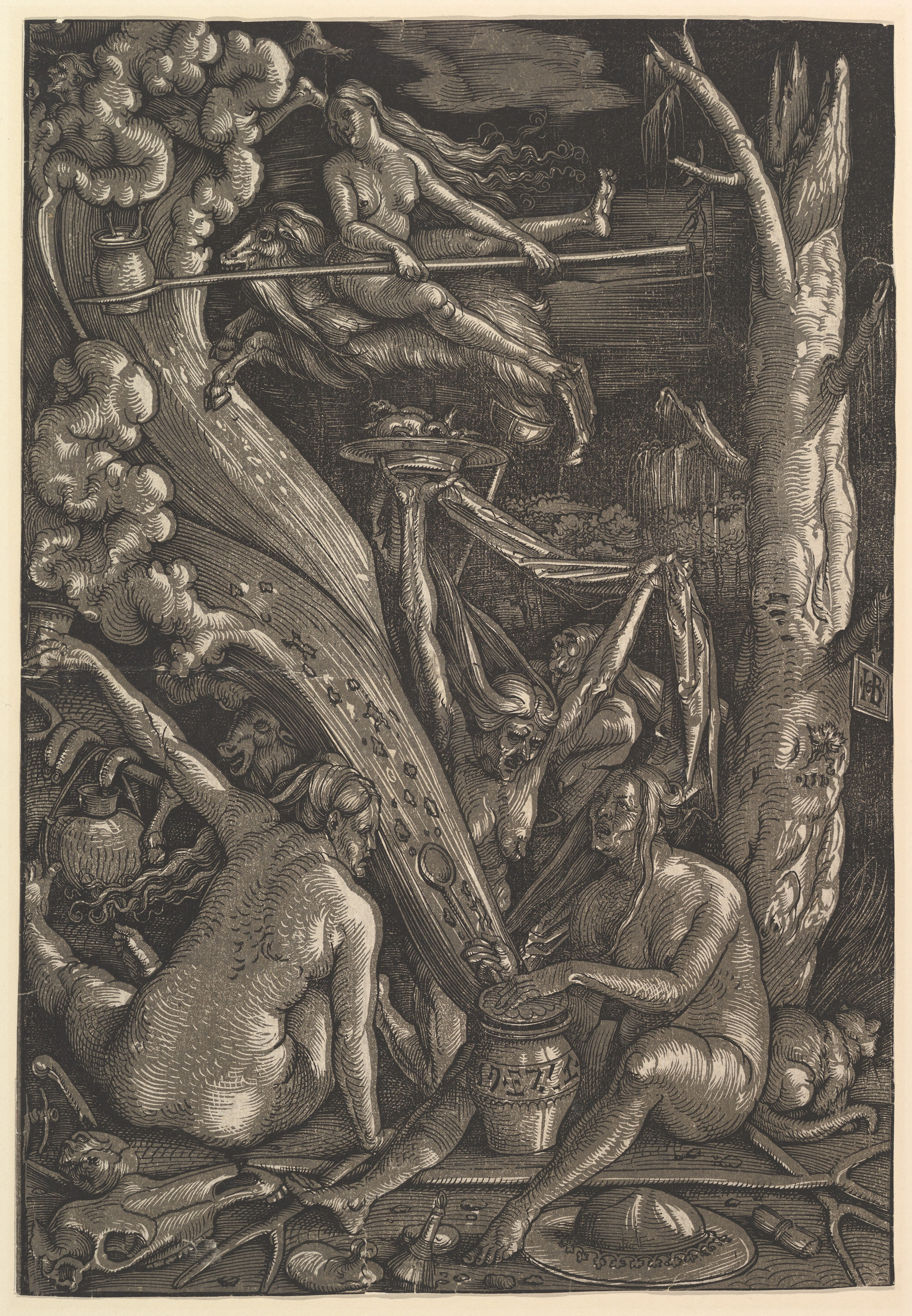
The orange-toned print.

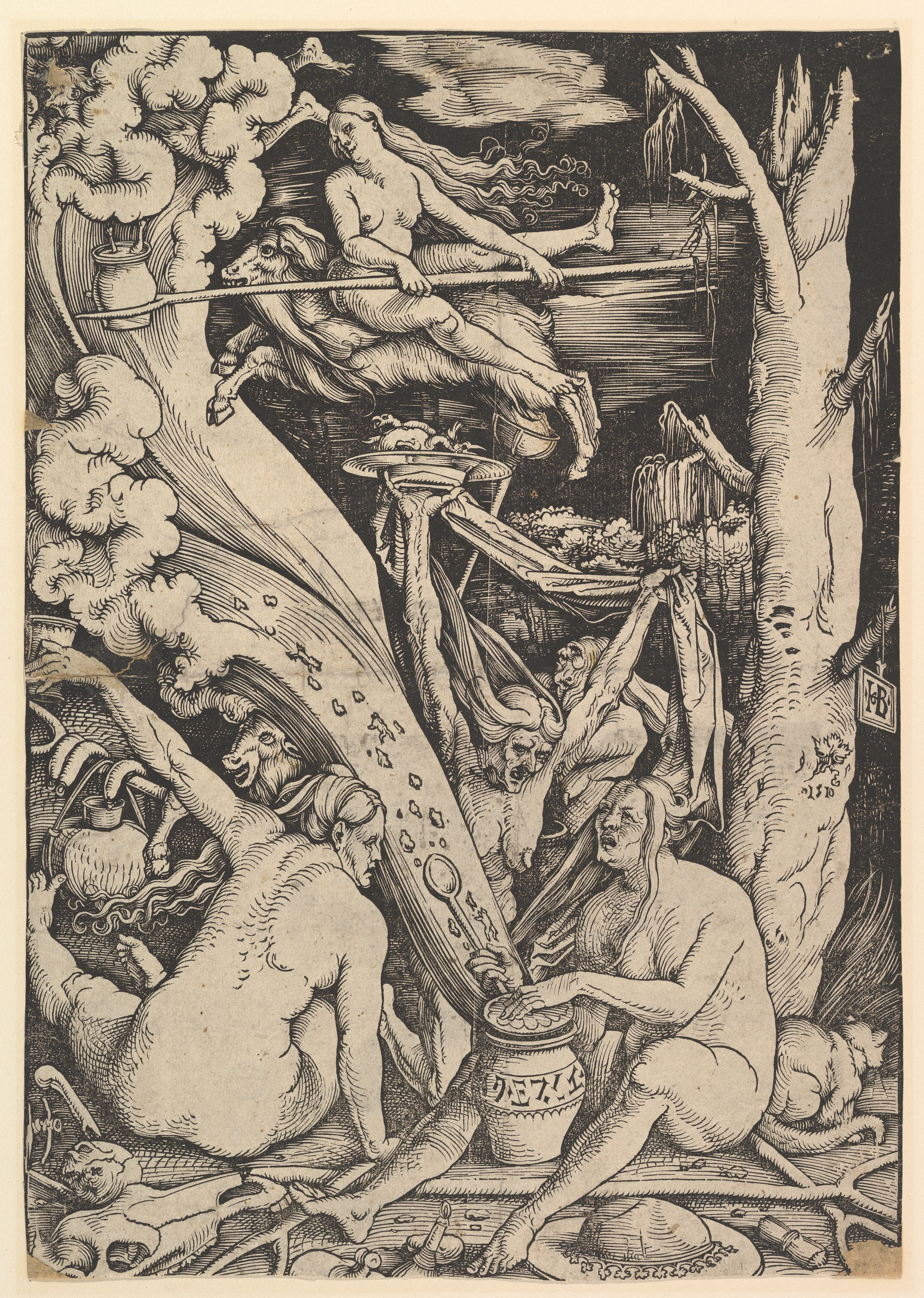
The key image without a color block.

== Subject matter ==
=== Witches' Sabbath ===
A Witches' Sabbath (also called Witches' Sabbat) was an event where witches would assemble to worship the devil. This image is an inversion of the Christian Mass. Rather than receive the body and blood of Christ, participants instead offered up human flesh to Satan. The Sabbath contains elements of bestiality and adultery. The devil, in the form of an animal or a human, would copulate with all of the witches at the Sabbath. It was also thought that the witches would perform these sexual acts in front of their children. The children would also be given to the devil, presumably as a sacrifice. Several of Baldung's other works that involve witches or witch-like figures do feature children.

The witches in Baldung's image are not actually at a Sabbath, but are preparing a flying potion that will allow them to travel to the Sabbath, a larger gathering of witches. There is a lack of feasting and dancing as a group, essential elements of a Sabbath. The pot containing a flying potion and uneaten food also suggest they are carrying food to a larger gathering.

At the time of the image's creation in 1510, the Sabbath was largely considered a fictional idea and not widely considered to be a legitimate threat. Most peasants did not know about it, and even among theologians and witch hunters, the Sabbath did not necessarily play a large role in demonology. Although the Sabbath was first mentioned in the Malleus Maleficarum and would later become an essential component of many witch trials, in Strasbourg at this time the legitimacy of the Sabbath's existence was in dispute.

=== Witches' flight ===
In this image by Baldung, the witches are using an unguent contained in a jar that will be used for flight.

Early witch hunters did not believe it possible for witches to fly or levitate. The idea of witches' flight, sometimes referred to as "transvection," was officially denounced by the Canon Episcopi, a resource for canon law in the medieval ages that explicitly stated how Satan and witchcraft functioned. Witches' flight was also dismissed as fantasy by Alphonso de Spina in Fortalicium Fidei, Gianfrancesco Ponzinibio in Tractatus de Lamiis, Jean Bodin in De la demonomanie de les sorciers, and in the speeches of preacher Johann Geiler von Kaisersberg.

Although originally considered an impossibility, witches' flight was essential to making the Witches' Sabbath and the subsequent witch hunts possible. Sabbaths were generally thought to take place far away from where witches lived. Therefore, in order to attend a Sabbath, witches needed to be able to cross large distances in a short amount of time. Witch hunters needed a way to circumvent the Cannon Episcopi and popularize the idea of witches' flight as feasible in order to better prosecute and convict people of being witches. The Malleus Maleficarum provided biblical evidence for flight as a power of Satan, citing Matthew 4:8 where Satan lifts Jesus onto a mountain top to tempt him into submitting to the devil. The Malleus also mentions how in Daniel 14:33-36, an angel flew Habakkuk to Babylon from Judea in only a few minutes, carrying the prophet by his hair. The devil, as a fallen angel, would still have the ability to fly. Therefore, flight was a power witches would be able to use due to their connection with the devil.

Witches' flight was later used in witch trials, specifically to discredit the husband's testimony. The husband could testify that he had spent the entire night in bed at his wife's side, but witches' flight made it possible for the supposed witch to leave while the husband shut his eyes, fly away to attend the sabbath, and then come back before the husband awoke.

== Description of imagery ==
=== Maleficia and the Malleus Maleficarum ===
Maleficia were unexplained events that were attributed to witchcraft. According to Jane Schuyler, Baldung's image suggests two instances of maleficia: the bones suggest a murder and the insects and toads in the jar vapors suggest a biblical plague. The Malleus Maleficarum states that witches are able to create storms and plagues with the help of Satan, citing the punishments inflicted on Job and the Pharaoh's magicians in the time of Moses who were able to recreate three of God's plagues.

The witches in this image are designed to mock the Christian Mass and the Eucharist. The witch sitting on the left side of the image holds a chalice in her hand. In a Catholic Mass, this chalice would be filled with sacramental wine which was then transformed into the Blood of Christ. The middle witch holds aloft the paten, a plate which would hold the sacramental bread. This bread would be converted to the Body of Christ during the miracle of transubstantiation. The plate instead holds two chickens. The witch in the middle also holds a dirty cloth above her head, referencing both the corporal and altar cloth a priest would use to display the monstrance.

On the upper-left of the image, to the left of the witch flying on a goat, there is a figure obscured by the vapors coming out of the unguent jar. It's not possible to determine the identity or sex of this individual as only their legs and feet can be seen sticking out of the vapors. There is a bishop's hat on the ground, suggesting that it may belong to the obscured figure. If true, then this bishop would be the only male in this image, excluding the animals.

Various bones surround the witches, including a human skull and a horse's skull. The bones suggest cannibalism and infanticide, both referenced in Question XI of the first part of the Malleus Maleficarum. In it, the supposed witch confesses that witches kill infants in a way that suggests overlaying or natural causes. Afterwards the infant's bodies are dug up so that they can be boiled in a cauldron. A partially hidden cauldron can be seen behind the middle witch. The accused witch also mentioned that the boiled solids can be made into an unguent that assists in pleasure and transportation specifically.

=== Lust ===
Witchcraft was believed to specifically come from carnal lust. The Malleus maleficarum specifies that in women this carnal lust is "insatiable."

The Malleus Maleficarum also connects the lust of these witches to Eve, saying that Eve seduced Adam in the creation of original sin. Two of the witches sitting on the ground have their legs spread out, and the witch riding a goat poses in such a way that the pitchfork emerges from between her legs, suggesting a phallus.

The unrestrained, flowing hair of the witches is also a sex symbol. According to the Malleus Maleficarum, loose hair would draw the devil's fascination and distract men during worship. Long hair could also hide witch's marks or charms, to this end inquisitors would often order that a suspected witch's body be shaved of all hair preceding a trial.

Church inquisitors recognized the goat as a form the devil may take, so it's possible that the goat in this image may be the devil in animal form. The flying witch's backward posture on indicates she is not in control of the goat, or where he is going.

However, Jane Schuyler believes the multiple goats and a cat suggest that the goat is not a devil, but instead that these are animal familiars. The cat is on the right by the base of the tree, and has its back turned to the viewer. The second goat, to the center-left behind the seated witches, bleats and uses one leg to grab a pitchfork holding sausages and a cooking pot.

== Conflicting interpretations ==
Scholars are in dispute on whether these witches are meant to be interpreted as humorous exaggeration of witch hunters' beliefs or a startling depiction meant to frighten Baldung's audience.

Art historian Jane Schyler asserts that The Witches illustrates the beliefs of church inquisitors, and that its imagery is directly informed by the writings of the Malleus Maleficarum. Baldung, who had an attorney for a father and a professor for a brother, likely had access to the Malleaus maleficarum through his family members.

Margaret Sullivan, also an art historian, asserts that Baldung's image was not necessarily intended to accurately depict official witch-hunting ideas. Witches were almost unknown by the public at large before the year 1500. Sullivan points out that in early 1500s Germany witch trials and executions were actually relatively uncommon. Baldung and Dürer were both involved in humanist circles in Strasbourg, and humanists mostly considered witchcraft as "'lusting,' a matter that was more amusing than serious." Baldung being a humanist, the witches' appearance could be a reference to classical mythology. It's plausible that Baldung was inspired to create this by the publication of Lucan's De Bello Civili in Strasbourg the year before, which features the witch Erichtho. The witches' nakedness also served as an artistic opportunity for Baldung to show his prowess in anatomy by depicting a female nude.
