= Osculum infame =

Witch's supposed ritual greeting upon meeting with the Devil

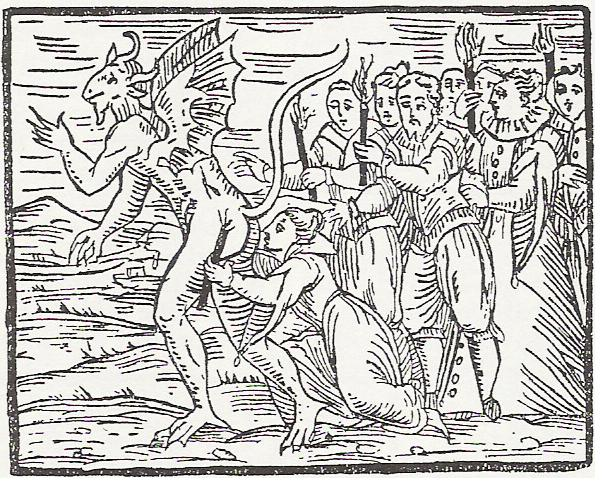
The osculum infame illustrated in Francesco Maria Guazzo's Compendium maleficarum of 1608

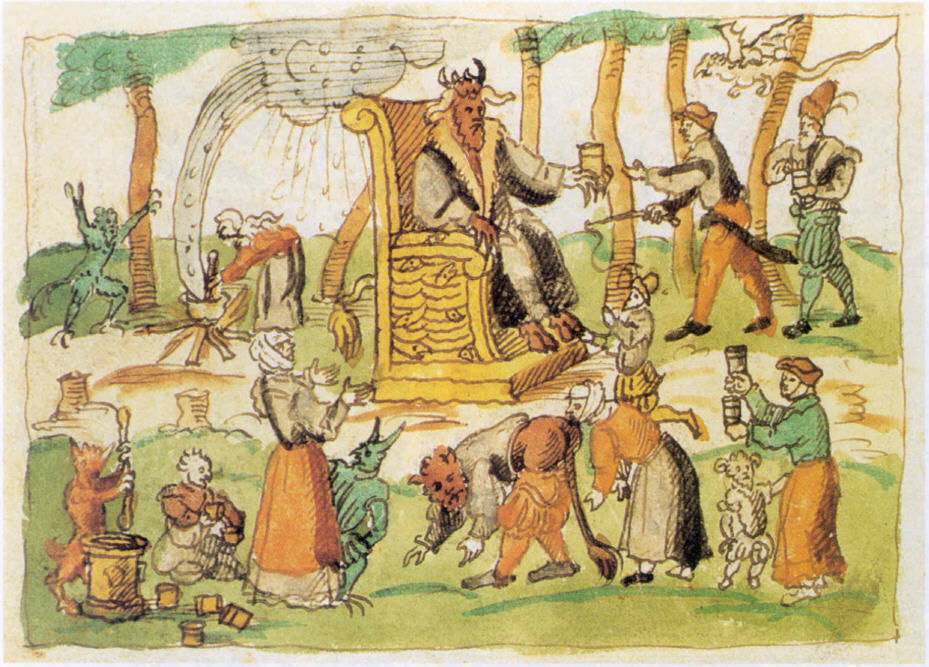
Sixteenth-century Swiss depiction of the Witches' Sabbath from the chronicles of Johann Jakob Wick. Note witch performing the osculum infame, not upon Satan himself (enthroned above), but upon one of his attendant demons who has lowered his trunk hose for the purpose.

Osculum infame is a witch's supposed ritual greeting upon meeting with the Devil. The name means the 'shameful kiss' or 'kiss of shame', since it involved kissing the devil's anus, his "other" mouth. According to folklore, it was this kiss that allowed the Devil to seduce women.

== Kiss of shame ==
During the era of witch-hunting, many believed that witches worshipped the Devil and paid him homage by kissing his posterior. The osculum infame is mentioned in nearly every single recorded account of a Witches' Sabbath and in confessions – most of which were extracted under torture. Although most common in Europe, no illustrations of it exist in the publications of English persecutions, possibly as torture was not regularly employed in the questioning of those accused. It was called the kiss of shame because it was generally regarded as an act of degradation.

According to the allegations, witches would give the kiss of shame at the beginning of the sabbat, after the Devil had read the names of his followers. They would approach him by crawling or walking backwards, turn, bow and kiss his posterior. It was believed that this kiss was required for a new witch to be initiated, and the kiss was followed by feasting.

Sometimes witches kissed not only the Devil's fundament, but lower-ranking demons' as well.

Generally considered to be an act of homage, or respect, the North Berwick witch trials of Scotland in the 16th century held that the kiss was an act of penance issued from the Devil. Reported in Newes from Scotland, declaring the damnable Life of Doctor Fian (1592) by W. Wright:

...and seeing that they tarried over long, hee at their coming enjoyned them all to a pennance, which was, that they should kisse his buttockes, in sign of duety to him, which being put over the pulpit bare, every one did as he had enjoyned them.

The pamphlet provided the first descriptions of the osculum infame to the English population. Belief held that the Devil demanded the kiss of shame in forms other than human, including rams, black cats, and toads. Errores Haereticorum, a medieval tract, claims that the Cathars took their name "from the term cat, whose posterior they kiss, in whose form Satan appears to them." The role could also be reversed whereby the witch was the recipient of the kiss.

== See also ==
- Anilingus
- Kiss of peace
- Witchcraft
