= Margareta Remmer =

Swedish official's wife who was accused of witchcraft

Margareta Remmer, was a Swedish official's wife. She was one of the people accused of witchcraft in the Katarina witch trials during the witch hunt known as the Great noise, which took place in Sweden in 1668–1676. During her trial, the child witnesses were exposed for committing perjury, which resulted in the entire Katarina witch trials being dissolved, and consequently in the entire Great noise witch hunt ending.

== Life ==
Margareta Remmer was born Margareta Staffandotter. She married Jakob Remmer, a Captain of the Royal City Guard in Stockholm, which functioned as the equivalent of the City Police.

During the Katarina witch trials in 1676, she was accused of having abducted children to Witches' Sabbath in Blockula. Remmer was implicated in witchcraft during previous trials in the Katarina witch trials, when her name was mentioned a number of times. Anna Zippel first mentioned Remmer during her trial, when she named her acquaintances to illustrate that she had influential friends. Remmer herself admitted a connection to Brita Zippel when she acknowledged that she had gifted the poor Brita Zippel bread on several occasions. The expert witness Lisbet Carlsdotter spread a story that she had seen three witches on top of the Brunkebergsåsen: Margareta Remmer, Anna Simonsdotter Hack and Karin Ambjörnsdotter – the other two of whom had been convicted for witchcraft.

During May and June, the condemned Anna Simonsdotter Hack testified that she had seen Remmer at the witches' sabbath with children around her. Remmer replied to Hack: "May God show you mercy when you lie on my like that". Remmer was now arrested and placed in prison awaiting her trial. During the trial against Malin Matsdotter in July, Malin's daughter Annika Eriksdotter testified to have seen not only her mother, but also Remmer at the witches' sabbath.

=== Trial ===
The trial of Margareta Remmer was opened by the Witchcraft Commission on 6 September 1676. A number of witnesses testified against her. The accusations against her were the same as those against the previous people accused. Both children and teenagers accused her of having abducted them to the witches' sabbath in Blockula. Adult witnesses accused her of having abducted their children to the witches' sabbath.

Her main accuser was Rittmaster Peder Gråå. Gråå was an enemy of her husband, who previously had Gråå charged and convicted of smuggling. Peder Gråå and his wife now accused Remmer's wife of having abducted their children to Blockula. These accusations were quickly adopted by several other children, who accused her of the same as Gråå. Since Margareta Remmer was the wife of a wealthy man, several wittnesses described her as being dressed in elegant fashion during her visit at the witches' sabbath.

Among her accusers were Lisbeth Carlsdotter and one of the two Myra maids, Annika Henriksdotter: Lisbeth Carlsdotter and Annika Henriksdotter were expert witnesses who had testified against many of the accused and participated in the witch rumours spread during the trials.

Margareta Remmer made a good impression before the court. The fact that she cried before court made a good impression since, according to contemporary demonology, a witch could not cry, and with words and gestures assured the court of her innocence "so poignant that she could make a stone cry". She behaved with humble respect before the court but defended herself with calm dignity and eloquence. She pointed out that those who testified against her where not acquainted with her, and that those who were – her friends and family members – could testify that the allegations were unfounded.

Her husband Jakob Remmer was enraged at the accusations against his wife and defended her not only before the court but also outside of it. He reportedly threatened the expert witness Lisbeth Carlsdotter with a cane outside of the court room, assured that if he had believed that his wife was a witch he would have torn his house down and burned her himself. Peder Broméen noted that Jakob Remmer had said that he wished the Devil would take the all the child witnesses.

During the trial of Margareta Remmer, the Witchcraft Commission started to question the reliability of the child witnesses. After the trial against Dufvans Margareta, the Commission had decided to question the child witnesses more carefully, and this was enforced during the Remmer trial. The Commission decided to scrutinize the testimonies and the protocol. The court started to ask the child witnesses to repeat their testimonies, rather than to confirm their previous written testimony. The children were subjected to harder pressure than before, and their testimonies more strictly scrutinized. This caused many children to waver in their testimonies.

The maid of Remmer testified that Lisbeth Carlsdotter and Annika Henriksdotter had attacked Remmer in the stairs outside of the court room and that the mother of Lisbeth had said that she had other women decapitated before. Several witnesses confirmed this testimony. One witness testified that several children had talked about taking back their testimonies, and that Lisbeth Carlsdotter had threatened one of them, struck one of them on her nose and said: "You damn bitch, should I take back my words that would cost me life and honor, my name is known among both gentlemen and counts, but Devil knows who you are".

The Commission started to experience doubt when informed that the witnesses, who testified against someone accused of having sinned against God, themselves swore so much. One of the Commissioners, the priest Eric Noraeus, pointed out that Lisbeth Carlsdotter had been heard swearing twenty times in a row.

=== 11 September ===
On 11 September 1676, several child witnesses broke down under the increasing pressure from the new interrogation method of the court and started to confess that they had committed perjury against not only Remmer but also against the previous suspects. Even Lisbeth Carlsdotter and the Gävle Boy eventually confessed perjury.

The breakthrough started with the interrogation of the Hans Kristiernsson, 13 years old, and Annika Thomasdotter, 15 years old, daughter of a corporal of the city guard. They both claimed that Remmer had taken them to Blockula, but their testimonies could not be verified against each other, which resulted in intense pressure from the court. Annika Thomasdotter finally broke down and stated that all children who denied that they had been at the witches' sabbath were pressured by the Myra maids who bullied them until they said that they had been, and she added:

"Yes, because many have threatened saying that I take children to Blockula unless I say that I am taken there myself. I have asked God to open my mind so I will find know if I have been in Blockula, but I have never seen any sign that I have ever visited the place".

Pressured if she could name anyone else who had committed perjury, she named Kerstin Jakobsdotter, 16 years old.

Kerstin Jakobsdotter was summoned and testified that it was the Myra maids who had started to spread the rumour that she used to be abducted to Blockula, and that the Myra maids and Lisbeth Carlsdotter had abused her physically and threatened her until she agreed to testify against Remmer. After this, a breakthrough occurred, and one child witness after the other confessed that ever since the start of the Katarina witch trials, they had lied because they had been threatened and pressured by the Gävle boy, by Lisbeth Carlsdotter and by the two Myra maids, Annika Henriksdotter and Agnis Eskilsdotter.

Lisbet Carlsdotter was summoned and confronted with the child witnesses who now claimed that they had lied and that none of them had ever been in Blockula. Lisbet Carlsdotter stated: "I stand by my word and my testimony even if you should destroy me".

Next, the Myra maid Annika Henriksdotter was confronted with the penitent child witnesses. When she testified that all the children had been in Blockula, they all denied her testimony. An identical scene occurred when the other Myra maid Agnis Eskilsdotter was called. The Myra maids were then both arrested and charged for perjury.

When Lisbet Carlsdotter was recalled, she was informed that the lies had now been exposed and that further lies from her would cause her to suffer in this world and in the next. When she was promised amnesty if she confessed, she burst into tears and confessed that she had lied all along.

On 11 September, the testimonies of all the child witnesses were declared invalid since they had been exposed with having talked them through with each other beforehand.

=== Aftermath ===
On 27 September 1676, Margareta Remmer was freed from all charges. On 6 October, she was officially declared innocent and that everyone who directed new accusations against her were liable to punishment. The perjury of the child witnesses did not only free Remmer; this event also resulted in the dissolution of the entire Katarina witch trial.

Two women, Dufvans Margareta and Karin Ambjörnsdotter, who had already been condemned to death and were awaiting their execution were both freed. All of the suspects who were imprisoned on the charge of witchcraft and sat in prison awaiting their trial, were one by one freed from all charges and released.

The Witchcraft Commission informed the legal courts in the rest of the country that the child witnesses had been lying and that such testimonies in the future could be expected to be lies as well and that no further such charges would be accepted, which resulted in the end of the entire Great noise witch hunt in Sweden. The Witchcraft Commission itself stopped their activity and was to be formally dissolved the following year.

After the end of the witch trials, legal persecution was directed toward the former witnesses, who were now formally accused of perjury. The Remmer couple were particularly active in these proceedings. Jakob Remmer, Captain of the City Guard (police force) had the city guards gather and arrest the witnesses who were thrown in jail. Margareta Remmer demanded the perjurers be punished, and the court assured that they would "see if they could give her the pleasure". Several of the former witchcraft witnesses were to be legally sentenced for perjury and punished by pillorying and in some cases by execution.
