= Witches' Sabbath =

Gathering of those believed to practice witchcraft

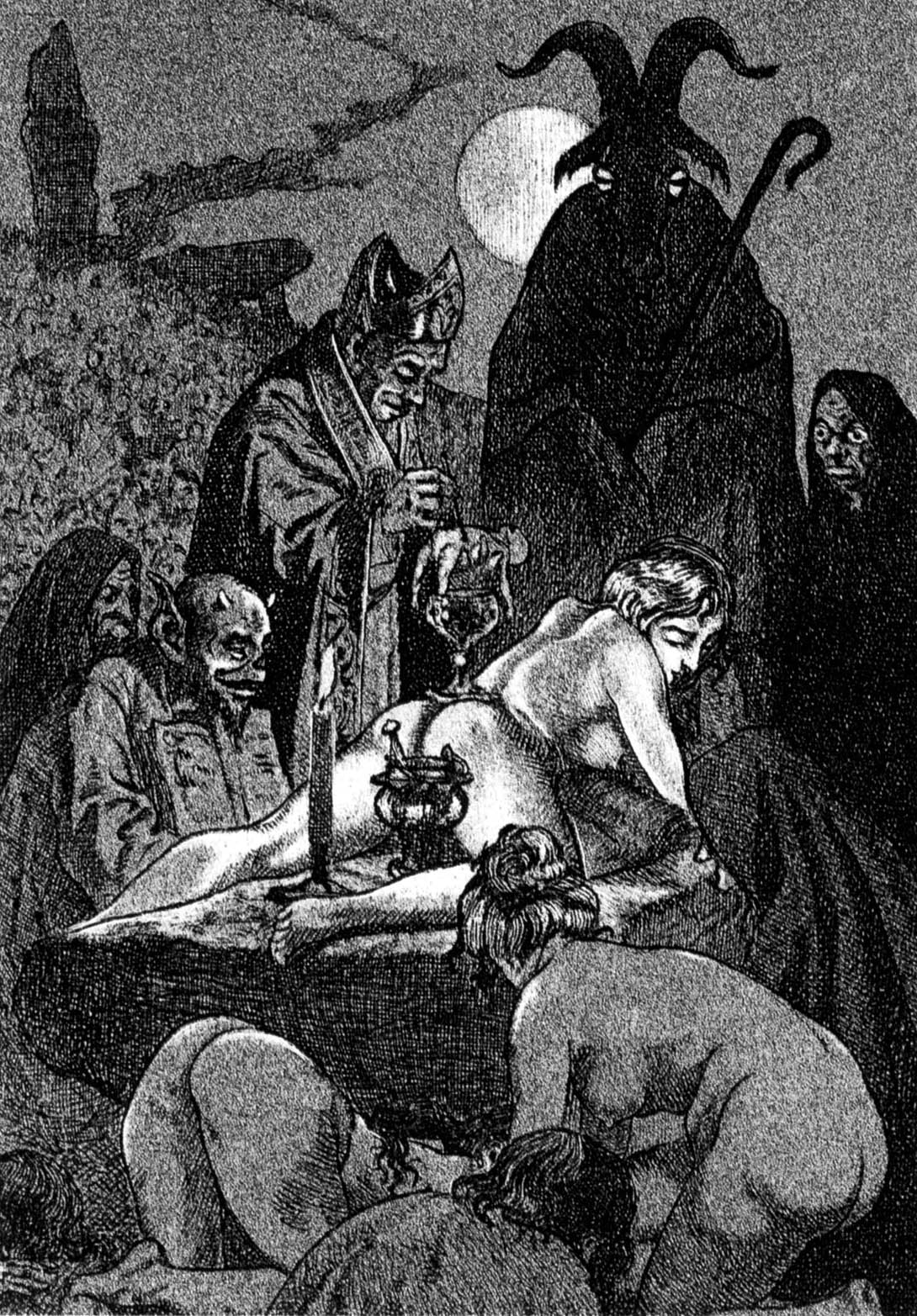
An illustration of Witches' Sabbath by Martin van Maële, from the 1911 edition of the book La Sorcière, by Jules Michelet

A Witches' Sabbath is a purported gathering of those believed to practice witchcraft and other rituals. The phrase became especially popular in the 20th century.

== Origin of the phrase ==
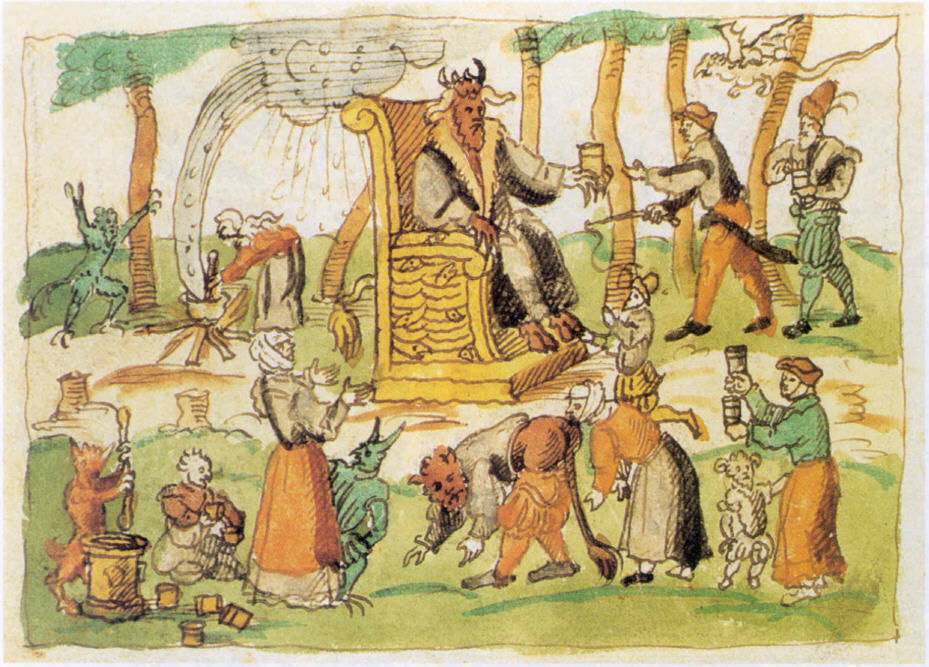
Sixteenth-century Swiss representation of Sabbath gathering from the chronicles of Johann Jakob Wick. Note the horned god seated on serpent-enlaced throne, witch performing the osculum infame upon a demon and another being aided by a demon to summon a storm from her cauldron, while others carouse and prepare magic potions

The most infamous and influential work of witch-hunting lore, Malleus Maleficarum (1486), does not contain the word sabbath (sabbatum).

The first recorded English use of sabbath referring to sorcery was in 1660, in Francis Brooke's translation of Vincent Le Blanc's book The World Surveyed: "Divers Sorcerers [...] have confessed that in their Sabbaths [...] they feed on such fare." The phrase "Witches' Sabbath" appeared in a 1613 translation by "W.B." of Sébastien Michaëlis's Admirable History of Possession and Conversion of a Penitent Woman: "He also said to Magdalene, Art not thou an accursed woman, that the Witches Sabbath [French: le Sabath] is kept here?"

The phrase is used by Henry Charles Lea in his History of the Inquisition of the Middle Ages (1888). Writing in 1900, German historian Joseph Hansen, who was a correspondent and a German translator of Lea's work, frequently uses the shorthand phrase Hexensabbat to interpret medieval trial records, though any consistently recurring term is noticeably rare in the copious Latin sources Hansen also provides (see more on various Latin synonyms, below).

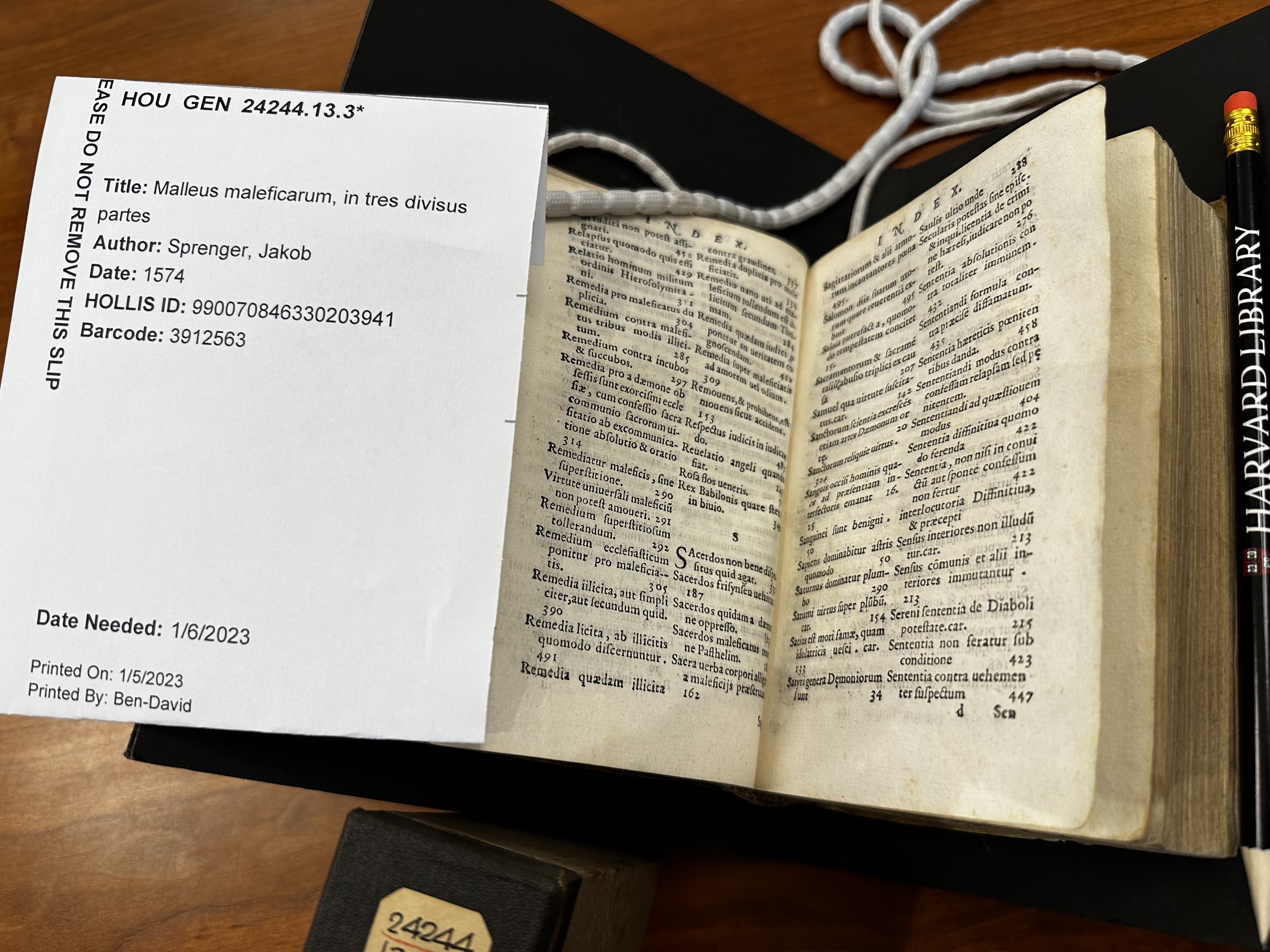
Index of a 1574 printing of Malleus Maleficarum

Lea and Hansen's influence may have led to a much broader use of the shorthand phrase, including in English. Prior to Hansen, use of the term by German historians also seems to have been relatively rare. Two compilations of German folklore by Jakob Grimm in the 1800s (Kinder- und Hausmärchen, Deutsche Mythologie) seem to contain no mention of Hexensabbat or any other form of the term Sabbat relative to fairies or magical acts. The contemporary of Grimm and early historian of witchcraft, W. G. Soldan, also does not seem to use the term in his history (1843).

=== A French connection ===
In contrast to German and English counterparts, French writers (including Francophone authors writing in Latin) used the term more frequently, albeit still relatively rarely. There seems to be deep roots to inquisitorial persecution of the Waldensians. In 1124, the term inzabbatos is used to describe the Waldensians in Northern Spain. In 1438 and 1460, seemingly related terms synagogam and synagogue of Sathan are used to describe Waldensians by inquisitors in France. These terms could be a reference to Revelation 2:9 ("I know the blasphemy of them which say they are Jews and are not, but are the synagogue of Satan"). Writing in Latin in 1458, Francophone author Nicolas Jacquier applies synagogam fasciniorum to what he considers a gathering of witches.

About 150 years later, near the peak of the witch-phobia and the persecutions which led to the execution of an estimated 40,000–100,000 persons, with roughly 80% being women, the Francophone writers still seem to be the main ones using these related terms, although still infrequently and sporadically in most cases. Lambert Daneau uses sabbatha one time (1581) as Synagogas quas Satanica sabbatha. Nicholas Remi uses the term occasionally as well as synagoga (1588). Jean Bodin uses the term three times (1580) and, across the channel, the Englishman Reginald Scot (1585) writing a book in opposition to witch-phobia, uses the term but only once in quoting Bodin.

In 1611, Jacques Fontaine uses sabat five times writing in French and in a way that would seem to correspond with modern usage. The following year (1612), Pierre de Lancre seems to use the term more frequently than anyone before.

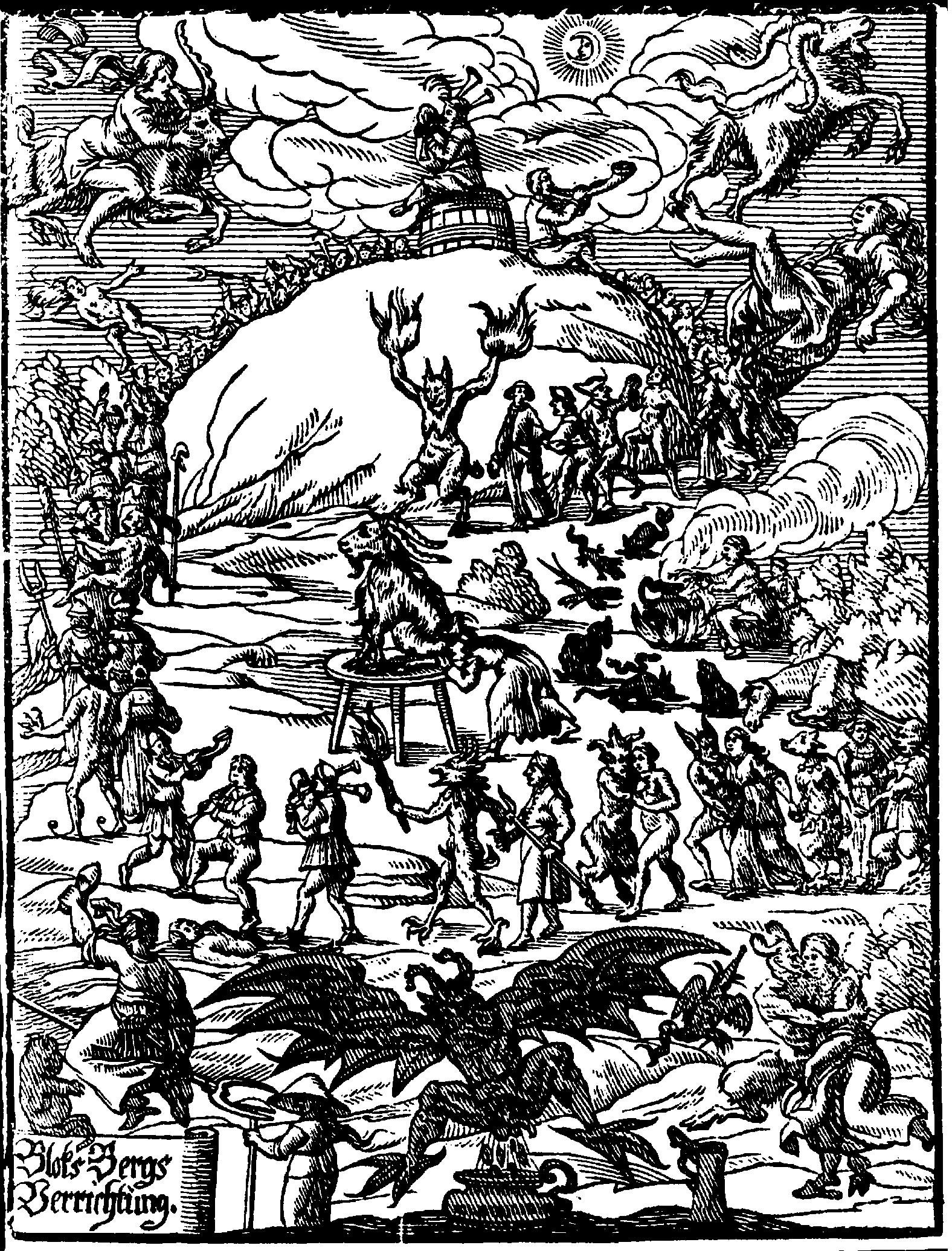
Witches' Sabbath. Johannes Praetorius: Blockes-Berges Verrichtung, Leipzig, 1668

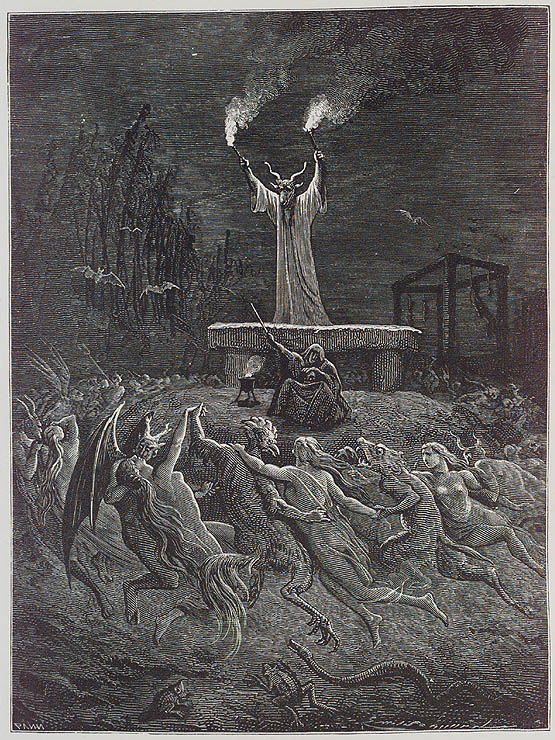
La danse du Sabbat, artist Émile Bayard: illustration from Histoire de la Magie by Jean-Baptiste Pitois (alias Paul Christian), Paris, 1870: circle dance of naked witches and demons around Devil standing on a dolmen atop a tumulus.

In 1668, a late date relative to the major European witch trials, German writer Johannes Praetorius published Blockes-Berges Verrichtung, with the subtitle "Oder Ausführlicher Geographischer Bericht von den hohen trefflich alt- und berühmten Blockes-Berge: ingleichen von der Hexenfahrt und Zauber-Sabbathe so auff solchen Berge die Unholden aus gantz Teutschland Jährlich den 1. Maij in Sanct-Walpurgis Nachte anstellen sollen" ("Or, Comprehensive Geographical Report of the high, excellent, old and famous Blockula [lit. Block mountains], likewise on the witches' rides and magic Sabbaths that the evil spirits from all Germany are said to hold on those mountains annually on 1 May on Saint Walpurgis' Night").

Writing more than two hundred years after Pierre de Lancre, another French writer, Lamothe-Langon (whose character and scholarship was questioned in the 1970s), uses the term in (presumably) translating into French a handful of documents from the inquisition in Southern France. Joseph Hansen cited Lamothe-Langon as one of many sources.

== A term favored by recent translators ==
Despite the infrequency of the use of the word sabbath to denote any such gatherings in the historical record, it became increasingly popular during the 20th century.

=== Cautio Criminalis ===
In a 2003 translation of Friedrich Spee's Cautio Criminalis (1631) the word sabbaths is listed in the index with a large number of entries. However, unlike some of Spee's contemporaries in France (mentioned above), who occasionally, if rarely, use the term sabbatha, Friedrich Spee does not ever use words derived from sabbatha or synagoga. Spee was German-speaking, and like his contemporaries, wrote in Latin. Conventibus is the word Spee uses most frequently to denote a gathering of witches, whether supposed or real, physical or spectral, as seen in the first paragraph of question one of his book. This is the same word from which English words convention, convent, and coven are derived. Cautio Criminalis (1631) was written as a passionate innocence project. As a Jesuit, Spee was often in a position of witnessing the torture of those accused of witchcraft.

=== Malleus Maleficarum ===
In a 2009 translation of Dominican inquisitor Heinrich Kramer's Malleus Maleficarum (1486), the word sabbath does not occur. There is a line describing a supposed gathering that uses the word concionem; it is accurately translated as an assembly. However in the accompanying footnote, the translator seems to apologize for the lack of both the term sabbath and a general scarcity of other gatherings that would seem to fit the bill for what he refers to as a "black sabbath".

=== Fine art ===
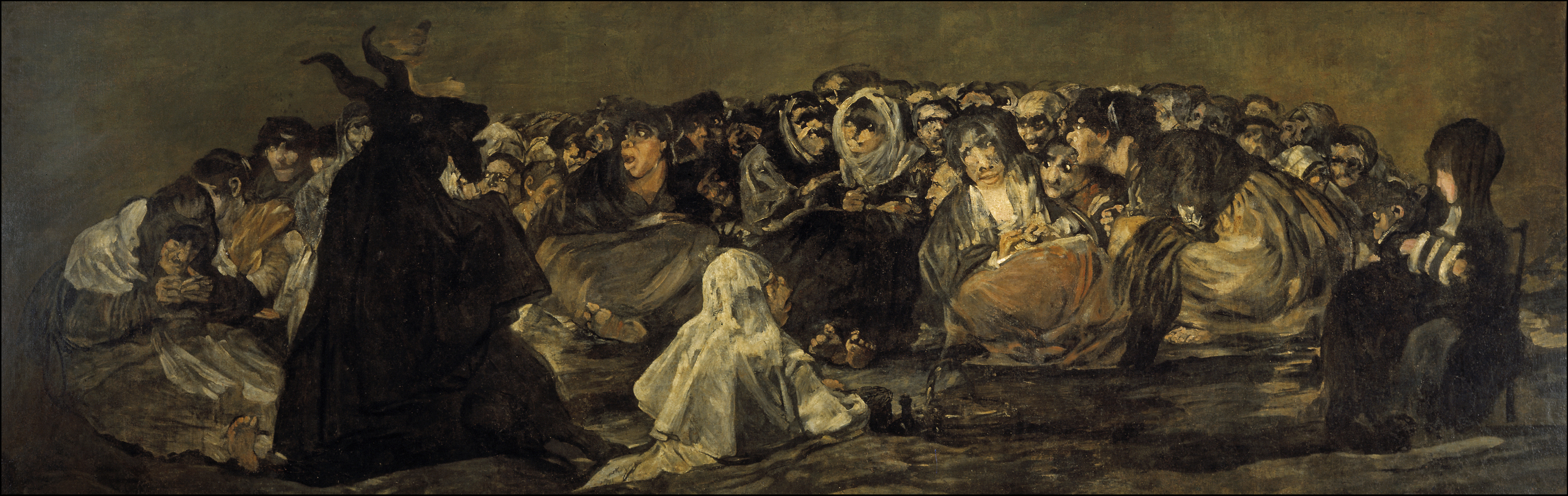
Francisco Goya - Aquelarre (Spanish Witches' Sabbath) a.k.a. The Great He-Goat

The phrase is also popular in recent translations of the titles of artworks, including:

- The Witches' Sabbath by Hans Baldung (1510)
- Witches' Sabbath by Frans Francken (1606)
- Witches' Sabbath in Roman Ruins by Jacob van Swanenburgh (1608)
- As a recent translation from the original Spanish El aquelarre to the English title Witches' Sabbath (1798) and Witches' Sabbath or The Great He-Goat (1823) both works by Francisco Goya
- Muse of the Night (Witches' Sabbath) by Luis Ricardo Falero (1880)

=== Music ===
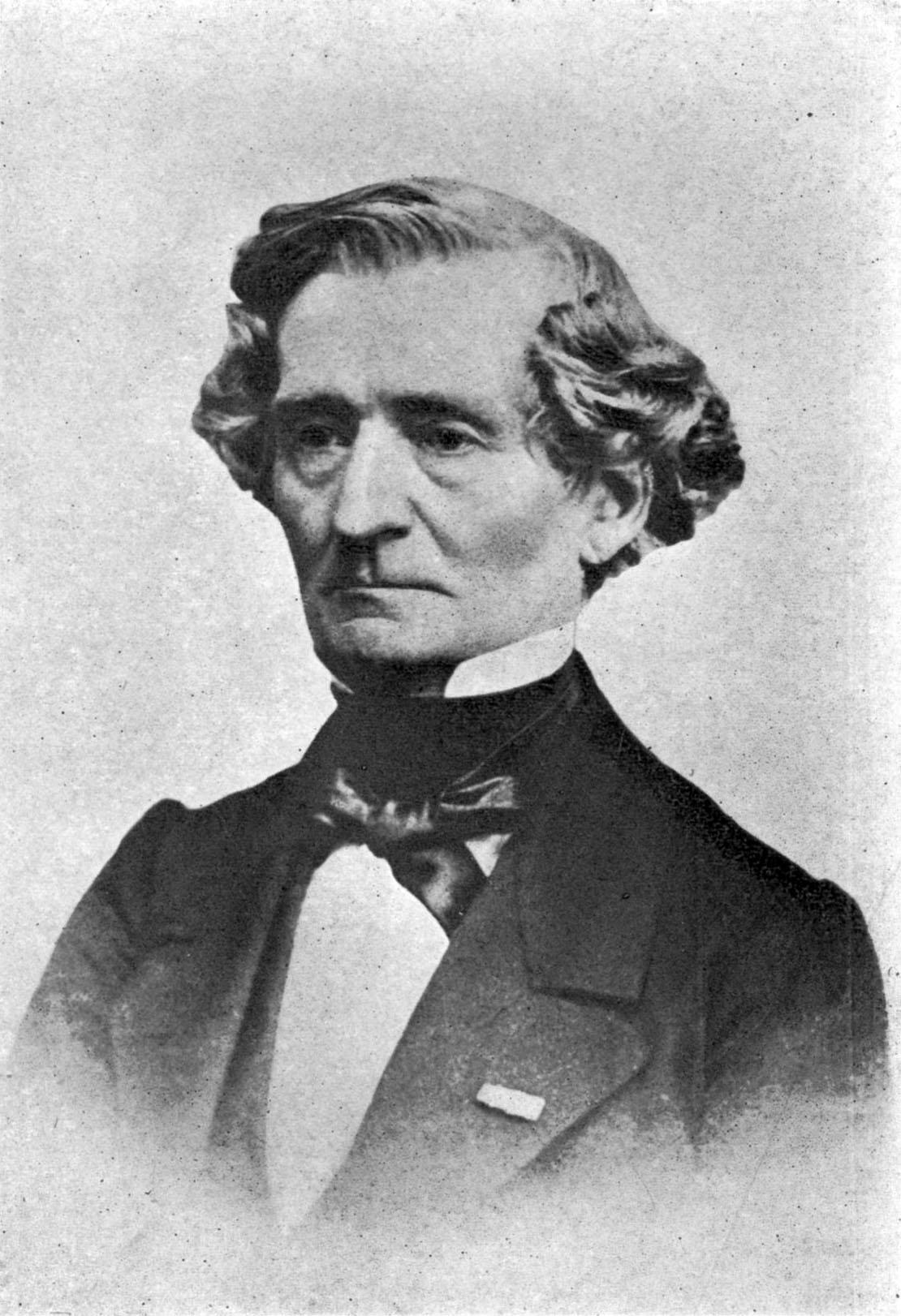
Hector Berlioz

In Hector Berlioz's Symphonie Fantastique, the fifth and final movement of the composition is titled "Hexensabbath" in German and "Songe d'une nuit du Sabbat" in French, strangely having two different meanings. In the popular English editions of the symphony, the title of the movement is "Dream of a Witches' Sabbath", a mixture of the two translations. The setting of the movement is in a satanic dream depicting the protagonist's own funeral. Crowds of sorcerers and monsters stand around him, laughing, shouting, and screeching. The protagonist's beloved appears as a witch, distorted from her previous beauty.

== Disputed accuracy of the accounts of gatherings ==
Modern researchers have been unable to find any corroboration with the notion that physical gatherings of practitioners of witchcraft occurred. In his study "The Pursuit of Witches and the Sexual Discourse of the Sabbat", the historian Scott E. Hendrix presents a two-fold explanation for why these stories were so commonly told in spite of the fact that sabbats likely never actually occurred. First, belief in the real power of witchcraft grew during the late medieval and early-modern Europe as a doctrinal view in opposition to the canon Episcopi gained ground in certain communities. This fueled a paranoia among certain religious authorities that there was a vast underground conspiracy of witches determined to overthrow Christianity. Women beyond child-bearing years provided an easy target and were scapegoated and blamed for famines, plague, warfare, and other problems. Having prurient and orgiastic elements helped ensure that these stories would be relayed to others.

=== Ritual elements ===
Bristol University's Ronald Hutton has encapsulated the Witches' Sabbath as an essentially modern construction, saying:

[The concepts] represent a combination of three older mythical components, all of which are active at night:

(1) A procession of female spirits, often joined by privileged human beings and often led by a supernatural woman;

(2) A lone spectral huntsman, regarded as demonic, accursed, or otherworldly;

(3) A procession of the human dead, normally thought to be wandering to expiate their sins, often noisy and tumultuous, and usually consisting of those who had died prematurely and violently.

The first of these has pre-Christian origins, and probably contributed directly to the formulation of the concept of the witches’ sabbath. The other two seem to be medieval in their inception, with the third to be directly related to growing speculation about the fate of the dead in the 11th and 12th centuries."

The book Compendium Maleficarum (1608), by Francesco Maria Guazzo, illustrates a typical view of gathering of witches as "the attendants riding flying goats, trampling the cross, and being re-baptised in the name of the Devil while giving their clothes to him, kissing his behind, and dancing back to back forming a round."

In effect, the sabbat acted as an effective 'advertising' gimmick, causing knowledge of what these authorities believed to be the very real threat of witchcraft to be spread more rapidly across the continent. That also meant that stories of the sabbat promoted the hunting, prosecution, and execution of supposed witches.

The descriptions of Sabbats were made or published by priests, jurists and judges who never took part in these gatherings, or were transcribed during the process of the witchcraft trials. That these testimonies reflect actual events is for most of the accounts considered doubtful. Norman Cohn argued that they were determined largely by the expectations of the interrogators and free association on the part of the accused, and reflect only popular imagination of the times, influenced by ignorance, fear and religious intolerance towards minority groups.

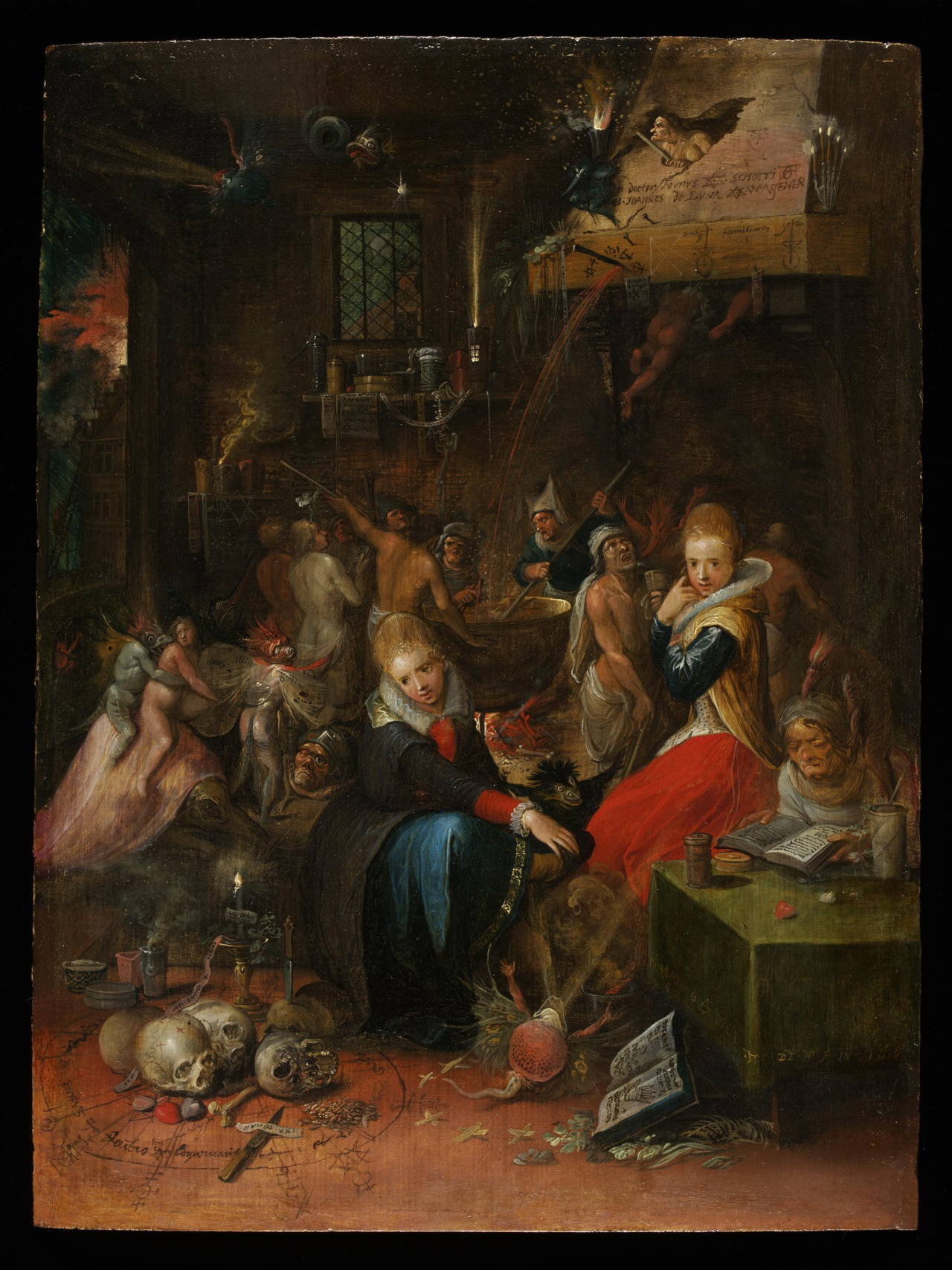
Witches' Sabbath (1606) by Frans Francken the Younger. Note amorous imps, brewing of magic potions and magical flight of witches up a chimney

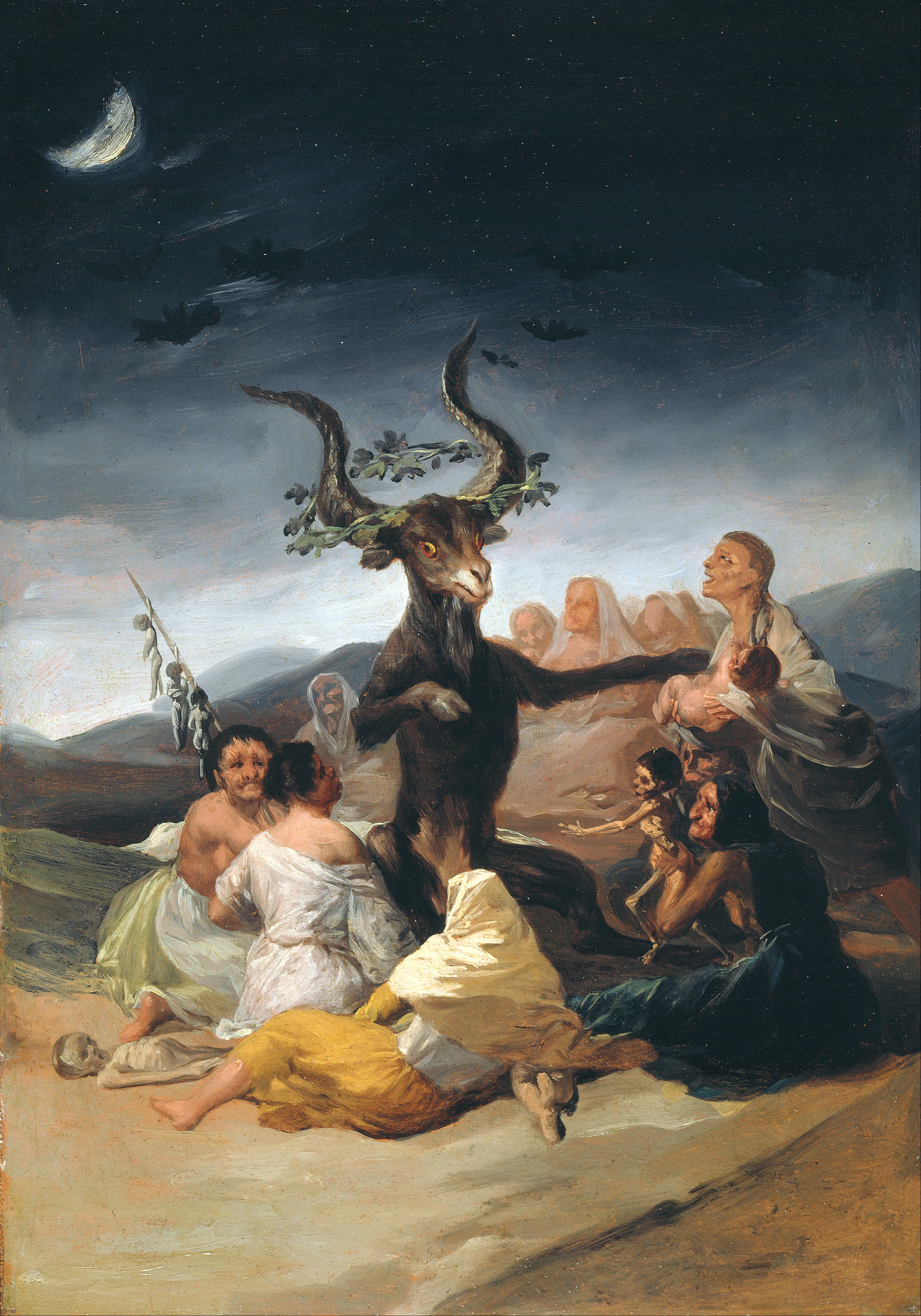
Aquelarre (Basque/Spanish Witches' Sabbath; circa 1797-1798) by Francisco Goya.

Some of the existing accounts of the Sabbat were given when the person recounting them was being tortured, and so motivated to agree with suggestions put to them.

Christopher F. Black claimed that the Roman Inquisition's sparse employment of torture allowed accused witches to not feel pressured into mass accusation. This in turn means there were fewer alleged groups of witches in Italy and places under inquisitorial influence. Because the Sabbath is a gathering of collective witch groups, the lack of mass accusation means Italian popular culture was less inclined to believe in the existence of Black Sabbath. The Inquisition itself also held a skeptical view toward the legitimacy of Sabbath Assemblies.

Many of the diabolical elements of the Witches' Sabbath stereotype, such as the eating of babies, poisoning of wells, desecration of hosts or kissing of the devil's anus, were also made about heretical Christian sects, lepers, Muslims and Jews. The term is the same as the normal English word "Sabbath" (itself a transliteration of Hebrew "Shabbat", the seventh day, on which the Creator rested after creation of the world), referring to the witches' equivalent to the Christian day of rest; a more common term was "synagogue" or "synagogue of Satan" possibly reflecting anti-Jewish sentiment, although the acts attributed to witches bear little resemblance to the Sabbath in Christianity or Jewish Shabbat customs. The Errores Gazariorum ("Errors of the Cathars"), which mentions the Sabbat, while not discussing the actual behavior of the Cathars, is named after them, in an attempt to link these stories to an heretical Christian group.

More recently, scholars such as Emma Wilby have argued that although the more diabolical elements of the witches' sabbath stereotype were invented by inquisitors, the witchcraft suspects themselves may have encouraged these ideas to circulate by drawing on popular beliefs and experiences around liturgical misrule, cursing rites, magical conjuration and confraternal gatherings to flesh-out their descriptions of the sabbath during interrogations.

Christian missionaries' attitude to African cults was not much different in principle to their attitude to the Witches' Sabbath in Europe; some accounts viewed them as a kind of Witches' Sabbath, but they are not. Some African communities believe in witchcraft, but as in the European witch trials, people they believe to be "witches" are condemned rather than embraced.

=== Possible connections to real groups ===
Other historians, including Carlo Ginzburg, Éva Pócs, Bengt Ankarloo and Gustav Henningsen hold that these testimonies can give insights into the belief systems of the accused. Ginzburg famously discovered records of a group of individuals in Northern Italy, calling themselves benandanti, who believed that they went out of their bodies in spirit and fought amongst the clouds against evil spirits to secure prosperity for their villages, or congregated at large feasts presided over by a goddess, where she taught them magic and performed divinations. Ginzburg links these beliefs with similar testimonies recorded across Europe, from the armiers of the Pyrenees, from the followers of Signora Oriente in fourteenth century Milan and the followers of Richella and 'the wise Sibillia' in fifteenth century northern Italy, and much further afield, from Livonian werewolves, Dalmatian kresniki, Hungarian táltos, Romanian căluşari and Ossetian burkudzauta. In many testimonies, these meetings were described as out-of-body, rather than physical, occurrences.

=== Role of topically-applied hallucinogens ===
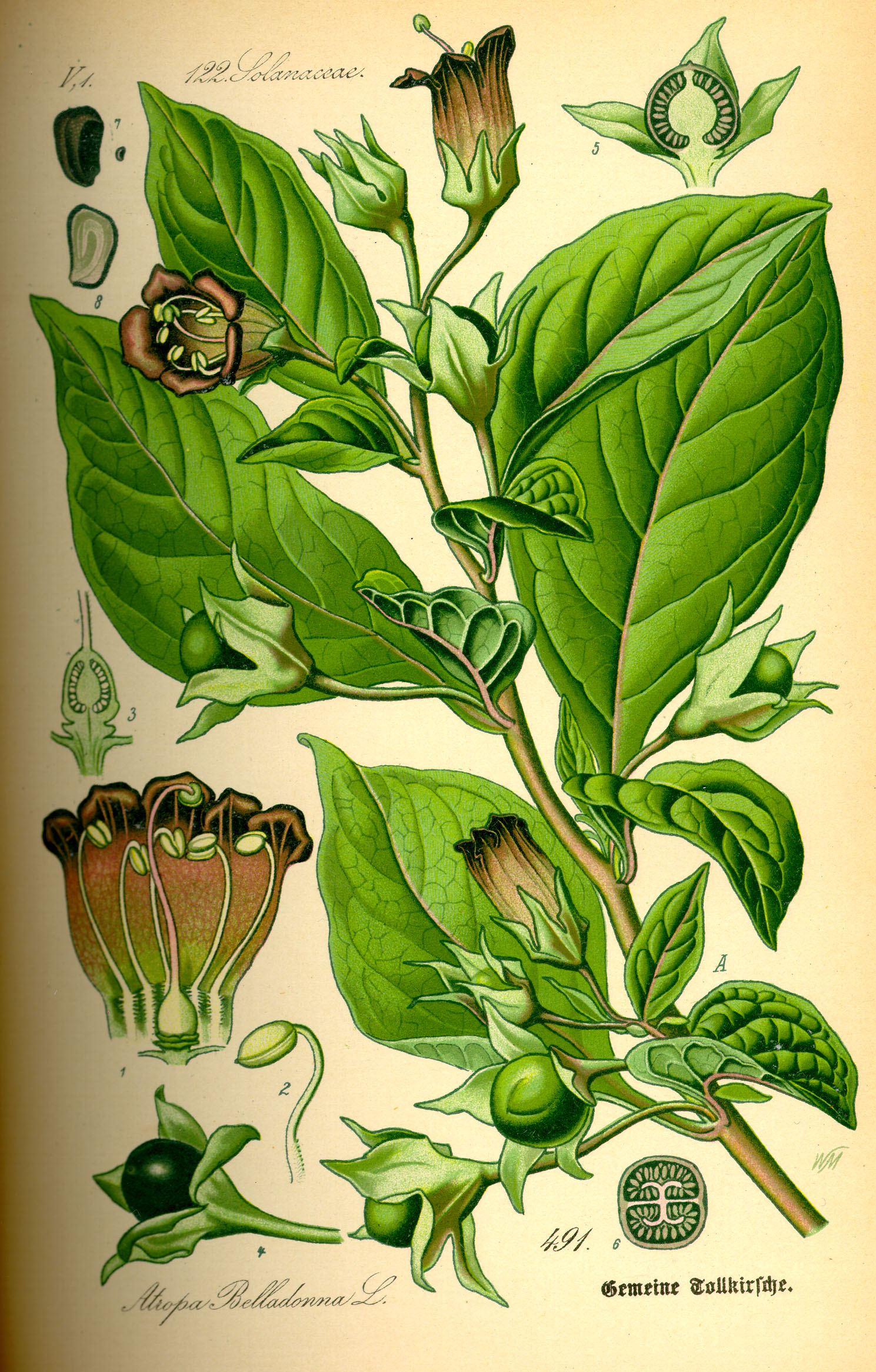
"Flying ointment" ingredient: deadly nightshade: Atropa belladonna (family: Solanaceae)

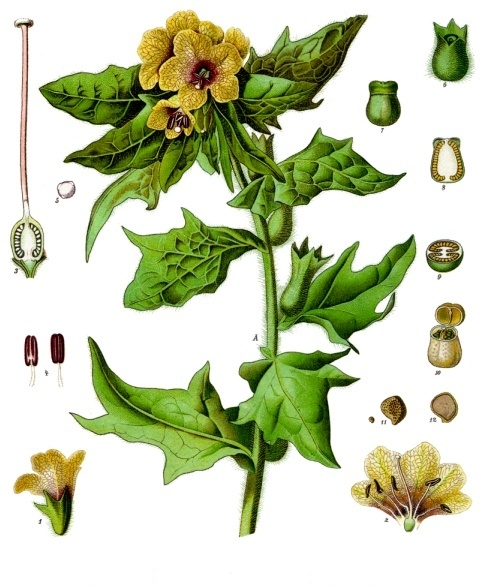
"Flying ointment" ingredient black henbane Hyoscyamus niger (family: Solanaceae)

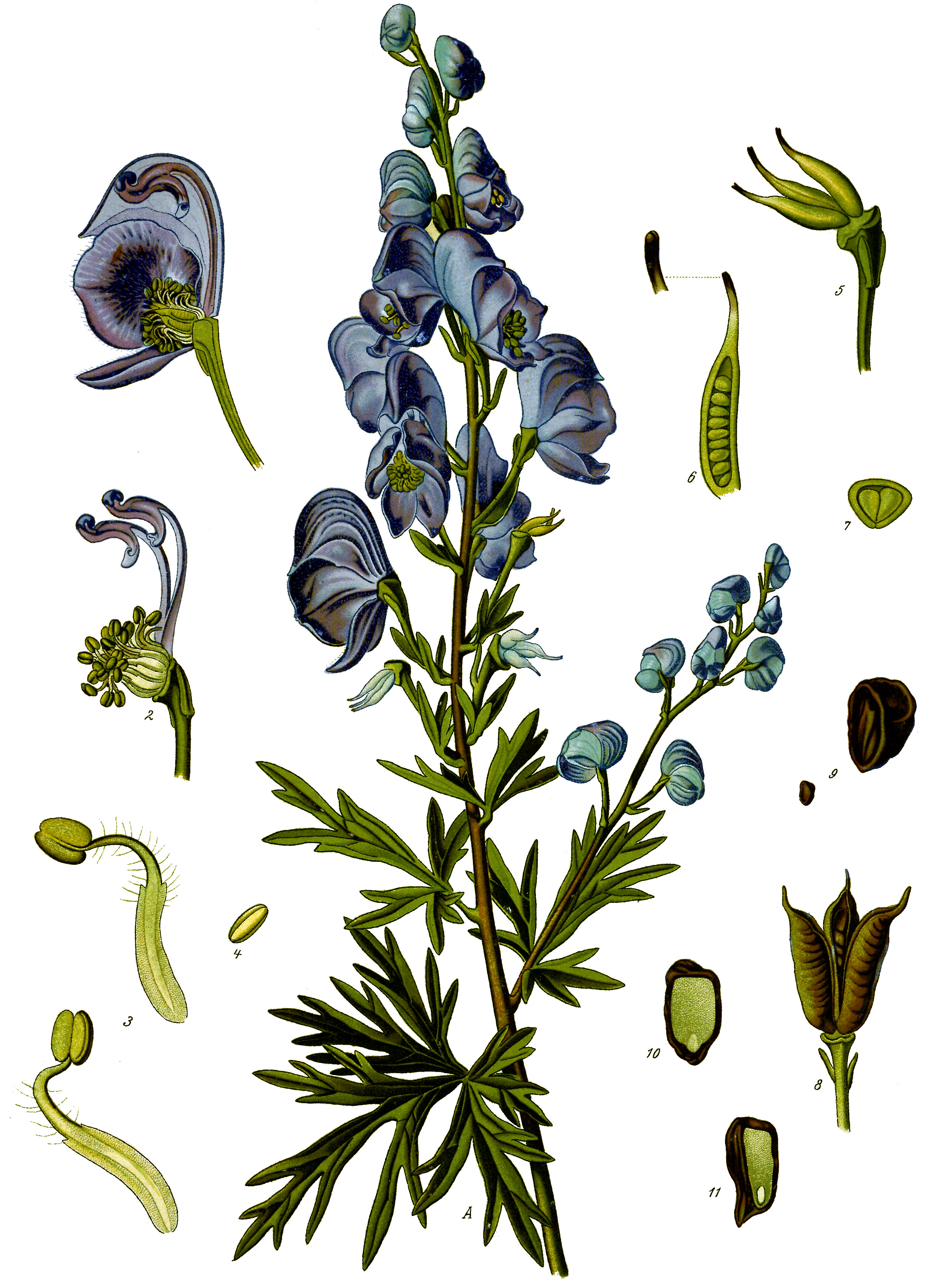
"Flying ointment" ingredient Aconite/Wolfsbane Aconitum napellus Aconite/Wolfsbane (family: Ranunculaceae)

Magic ointments...produced effects which the subjects themselves believed in, even stating that they had intercourse with evil spirits, had been at the Sabbat and danced on the Brocken with their lovers...The peculiar hallucinations evoked by the drug had been so powerfully transmitted from the subconscious mind to consciousness that mentally uncultivated persons...believed them to be reality.

Carlo Ginzburg's researches have highlighted shamanic elements in European witchcraft compatible with (although not invariably inclusive of) drug-induced altered states of consciousness. In this context, a persistent theme in European witchcraft, stretching back to the time of classical authors such as Apuleius, is the use of unguents conferring the power of "flight" and "shape-shifting." Recipes for such "flying ointments" have survived from early modern times, permitting not only an assessment of their likely pharmacological effects – based on their various plant (and to a lesser extent animal) ingredients – but also the actual recreation of and experimentation with such fat or oil-based preparations. Ginzburg makes brief reference to the use of entheogens in European witchcraft at the end of his analysis of the Witches Sabbath, mentioning only the fungi Claviceps purpurea and Amanita muscaria by name, and stating about the "flying ointment" on page 303 of 'Ecstasies...' :

In the Sabbath the judges more and more frequently saw the accounts of real, physical events. For a long time the only dissenting voices were those of the people who, referring back to the Canon episcopi, saw witches and sorcerers as the victims of demonic illusion. In the sixteenth century scientists like Cardano or Della Porta formulated a different opinion : animal metamorphoses, flights, apparitions of the devil were the effect of malnutrition or the use of hallucinogenic substances contained in vegetable concoctions or ointments...But no form of privation, no substance, no ecstatic technique can, by itself, cause the recurrence of such complex experiences...the deliberate use of psychotropic or hallucinogenic substances, while not explaining the ecstasies of the followers of the nocturnal goddess, the werewolf, and so on, would place them in a not exclusively mythical dimension.

– in short, a substrate of shamanic myth could, when catalysed by a drug experience (or simple starvation), give rise to a 'journey to the Sabbath', not of the body, but of the mind. Ergot and the Fly Agaric mushroom, while hallucinogenic, were not among the ingredients listed in recipes for the flying ointment. The active ingredients in such unguents were primarily, not fungi, but plants in the nightshade family Solanaceae, most commonly Atropa belladonna (Deadly Nightshade) and Hyoscyamus niger (Henbane), belonging to the tropane alkaloid-rich tribe Hyoscyameae. Other tropane-containing, nightshade ingredients included the Mandrake Mandragora officinarum, Scopolia carniolica and Datura stramonium, the Thornapple. The alkaloids Atropine, Hyoscyamine and Scopolamine present in these Solanaceous plants are not only potent and highly toxic hallucinogens, but are also fat-soluble and capable of being absorbed through unbroken human skin.

== See also ==
- Akelarre – Basque for Witches' Sabbath
- Aradia – Character in the Gospel of the Witches
- Bald Mountain (folklore) – Witchcraft location in Slavic mythology
- Black Mass – Satanic religious practice
- Blockula – Devil's secret island in Swedish legend
- Ecstasies: Deciphering the Witches' Sabbath – 1989 book by Carlo Ginzburg
- Flying ointment – Hallucinogenic salve used in the practice of witchcraft
- Isobel Gowdie – Scottish woman who confessed to witchcraft at Auldearn near Nairn in 1662
- Märet Jonsdotter – Swedish witch
- Alice Kyteler – Person accused of witchcraft
- Shabbat Chazon - Sabbath of Vision, aka "Black Sabbath"
- Sorginak – Supernatural being in Basque mythology
- Witch-hunt – Search for witchcraft or subversive activity
