= Gianfrancesco Ponzinibio =

Christian reformer

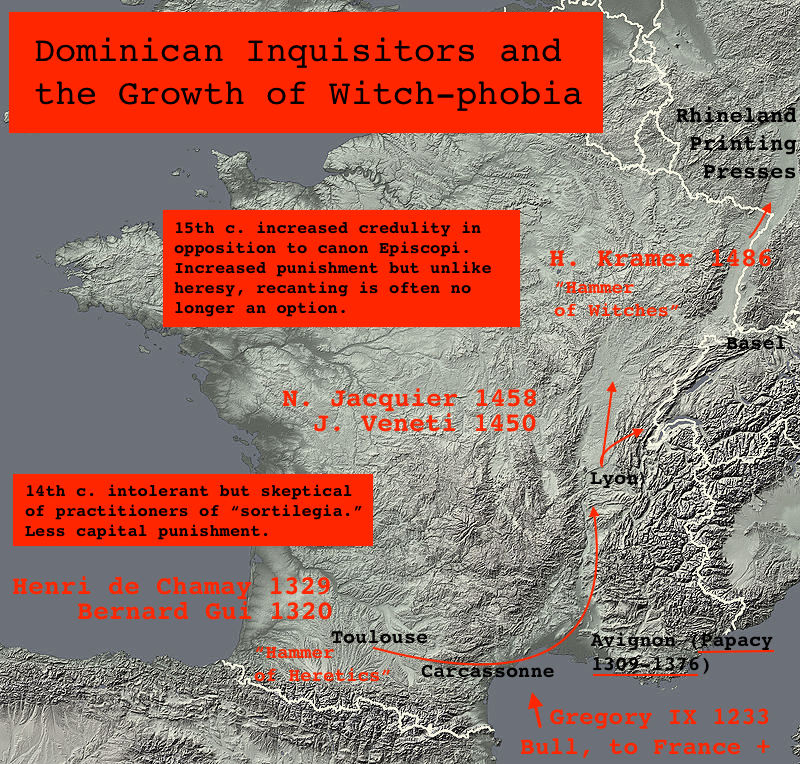
Pre-1500 map spread

Gianfrancesco Ponzinibio (fl. 1520) was a European jurist who criticized the relatively new change in Christian doctrine that had become popular in the 15th century especially among Dominican inquisitors and that espoused a belief in the real supernatural power of witchcraft.

Ponzinibio argued in favor of maintaining the ancient Christian theology as stated in the canon Episcopi. Ponzinibio's views soon came under attack by witch-phobic theologians like the Dominican Silvestro Mozzolino of Prierio (later Dominican General) who in 1521 published a work that did not attempt to defy the canon Episcopi but stating his opinion that to deny the real power of witchcraft would be "to discredit the infinite number of cases tried by the Inquisition, and consequently to discredit the laws themselves." Other critics of Ponzinibio soon followed including Bartolomeo de Spina, who devoted three tracts to refuting Ponzinibio's arguments and calling upon the Inquisition to prosecute Ponzinibio under suspicions of heresy and for the defending of heretics.

== Life ==
According to the archivist Joseph Hansen, a foremost historian of the European witchcraft trials, no information has been found about Ponzinibio's life outside of what can be gathered from his tract.
