= Dufvans Margareta =

Swedish maidservant

Margareta Matsdotter, known as "Dufvan" ("[The] Dove") or Dufvans Margareta ("Margaret the Dove"), was a Swedish maidservant. She was one of the people accused of witchcraft in the Katarina witch trials during the witch hunt known as the Great noise, which took place in Sweden in 1668–1676.

== Life ==
Dufvans Margareta was born to a gardener in Stockholm. She was working as a maidservant and was 21 years old at the time of her arrest. She became known as "Dufvans Margareta", which essentially means "Margaret, maidservant of Dufva", since the name of her employer was Dufva, which means "Dove". She was courted by a tailor, who had given her a silk dress as a gift. This had attracted envy, and she was suspected of practicing witchcraft.

During the Katarina witch trials in 1676, she was accused of having abducted children to Witches' Sabbath in Blockula. On 12 May 1676, Margareta Matsdotter, known as Trippelfusspigan (the Trippelfuss maid), had been executed for witchraft with Maria Jöransdotter and Anna Persdotter. Trippelfusspigan had named her former employer Agnis Johansdotter as the one who initiated her in sorcery. The two star witnesses Agnis Eskilsdotter and Lisbet Carlsdotter both claimed that Dufvans Margareta was the assistant of Agnis Johansdotter in sorcery, and Margareta Matsdotter confirmed their statements prior to her execution. Several children testified against her.

=== Trial ===
Dufvans Margareta was subjected to torture. During torture she confessed that Agnis Johansdotter had originally taken her to Blockula and taught her witchcraft, after which she had started to take children to Blockula herself. She also confessed to have married the servant of a nobleman during her stay in Blockula, whose face she had recognized in a man who passed by her cell door in prison. However, after the torture stopped, she took back her own testimony. She stated:

"I can only recollect what others make me remember. If no one had testified against me, I would not have confessed either".

Her case was hotly debated within the Witchcraft Commission and caused a conflict between its members. It was pointed out that her confession had been caused by torture and that the child witnesses were not trustworthy. Nevertheless, Dufvans Margareta and another woman who were put on trial at the same time, Karin Ambjörnsdotter, were sentenced to death. The verdict of Dufvans Margareta, however, continued to be brought up again and again within the Witchcraft Commission, and there were suggestions if it should be revoked. It was during her case that the Commission made the decision to be more careful with testimonies from children going forward.

=== Aftermath ===
The executions of Dufvans Margareta and Karin Ambjörnsdotter was never to be carried out. On 11 September, the child witnesses were exposed as perjurers during the trial against Margareta Remmer, which resulted in the entire Katarina witch trials being dissolved. The witnesses where arrested for perjury, all prisoners accused of witchcraft were freed, and the death sentence of Dufvans Margareta and Karin Ambjörnsdotter were revoked.

When Dufvans Margareta were informed that the child witnesses had been exposed for perjury, she commented that she had never been in Blockula, and that during her confession, she had simply designed it with material from the stories about the witches she had heard during the ongoing witch hunt.
