= Caterina Freixa =

Catalan accused witch (17th century)

Caterina Freixa (17th century) was a Catalan accused witch. The defence of her innocence by fourteen prestigious Catalan jurists after her arrest in 1619 marked the beginning of the end of the witch hunt in Catalonia.

== Trial ==
Freixa was born into a wealthy family and lived in Artés, Catalonia, where she married a landowner.

On 8 November 1619, she was arrested after being reported by a neighbour accused of witchcraft for having "removed a child's liver using diabolical arts and without leaving a scar".

In 2024, Josep Capdeferro, professor of legal history at the University Pompeu Fabra, discovered in the Episcopal Archive and Library of Vic in Catalonia, a legal document entitled Iuris responsum pro Catherina Frexer et de Prat, termini Artes, parochiae Sanctae Mariae de Horta, dioecesis Vicensis, uxore Iacobi Frexer which contains the arguments of 14 prestigious Catalan jurists linked to Generalitat de Catalunya (among them Joan Pere Fontanella) in defence of Caterina Freixa's innocence to try to avoid her death sentence. This document complements another that was discovered but not studied, which contains the response given by the prosecuting attorney Felip Vinyes and the testimony of fourteen alleged confessed witches who testified against and incriminated Freixa.

Catalonia had been a pioneer in Europe in legislating against witchcraft crimes, with the Code of Ordinances of the Àneu Valleys of 1424 being one of the oldest pieces of legislation on the subject. By the 17th century, Catalan intellectuals were beginning to question the witch hunts. In fact, in January 1619, a few months before Caterina Freixa's arrest, the Jesuit Pere Gil delivered a document to the Spanish viceroy to Catalonia Francisco Fernández de la Cueva, 7th Duke of Alburquerque against the witch hunt.

Following her arrest, between 1619 and 1622, a widespread debate opened between supporters of hunting and its opponents, with the Bishop of Vic being one of the main advocates of maintaining it. According to researcher Capdeferro, this marks the beginning of the end of the witch hunt in that Catalonia.

The sentence against Freixa is unknown, but it is known that in 1622 she was transferred to Barcelona. That year, a decree ordered the Royal Council of Catalonia (the highest judicial body) to investigate the cases, including that against Caterina Freixa, and the detainees were taken to Barcelona to be duly tried.
