= Code of Ordinances of the Àneu Valleys =

First European legal text specifically addressing the persecution of witchcraft

The Code of Ordinances of the Àneu Valleys (Catalan: Còdex d’Ordinacions de les Valls d’Àneu) is a code of legal provisions drafted between 1337 and 1424 in the Vall d'Àneu, in the Catalan Pyrenees during the Kingdom of Aragon.

It is the first legal text in Europe that specifically addresses the persecution of witchcraft and provides insight into medieval legislation related to the phenomenon of witchcraft.

== Historical background ==
La Vall d'Àneu, a mountainous and isolated region, was governed by its own legal system that combined elements of civil and ecclesiastical law. After the Counts of Pallars regained sovereignty over this valley in the early 14th century following half a century of internal wars, the territory was granted the privilege of compiling its customs and traditions in writing, which would become the supreme law. This compilation was carried out in the early 15th.

The first compilation dates back to 1337 and already included the crime attributed to women of causing inflammation in the lymph nodes of the neck.

== Content ==
The document that has been preserved is a copy written in 1500 that survived the fires that destroyed the archives of Àneu Valley in the 17th century. It is a legal code that compiles the customs, traditions and ordinances of Àneu Valley in a compilation dated 1408 and consisting of 47 chapters, to which 8 were added in 1419 and 9 in 1424. This latest update included a set of rules focused on regulating crimes related to witchcraft.

These latter rules are considered a legal precedent in Europe in the persecution of witchcraft, preceding later texts such as the papal bull Summis desiderantes affectibus (1484) and the Malleus Maleficarum (1487). They were enacted in 1424 by Arnau Roger IV, Count of Pallars.

A minor update took place at the end of 16th century.

The first chapters define the crimes associated with what was considered witchcraft and the corresponding penalties, while the remaining chapters detail judicial procedures and the collection of evidence.

Notable crimes include:

- Association with the Boc de Biterna: the demonic figure known as the Boc de Biterna was considered the personification of absolute evil. Those accused of worshipping him, abandoning the Christian faith and committing crimes such as infanticide, the manufacture of verins or other acts considered evil were condemned to be executed at the stake.
- Paying homage without associated crimes: even if no criminal acts were committed, worshipping the Boc and abandoning the Christian faith were punished with the same penalty as the previous crime, i.e. execution at the stake.
- Causing throat tumours: this was punished with the loss of property and execution, but the method was left to the discretion of the authorities.
- Manufacture of ointments: the preparation of herbal remedies, even for healing purposes, could be considered witchcraft. The penalty was death at the stake.
- Curses or witchcraft under the doorstep: placing ointments or evil potions on other people's doors was considered less serious, but was also punished with the loss of property and execution.
- Rituals to prevent marriage: curses to prevent marriage or marital relations led to public scorn and the amputation of the tongue.

The procedures included the immediate arrest of suspects, torture to obtain confessions, and the confiscation of property, an incentive that often motivated accusations for financial gain and that, in addition, the leading figures of the territory were concerned that the confiscation meant that the houses would be abandoned and end up in ruins. This led to the drafting of a new update at the end of 16th century with the aim of resolving the problem of confiscations, especially when the accused was an heiress. Thus, the new Ordinances established a fixed price for the confiscation of the accused's property.

== Impact ==
In a context of growing social anxiety and institutionalised religion, the Ordinances of the Àneu Valleys had a significant impact in Catalonia and legitimised the persecution of people accused of heretical practices, especially women. Furthermore, they set a precedent for subsequent legislation related to witchcraft, beyond Catalan territory as well.

Catalonia was among the pioneering territories in the persecution of witchcraft, with earlier regulation than other regions of Europe. The figure of the witch was laden with gender stereotypes, often used to control women who did not conform to social norms.
