= Compendium Maleficarum =

1608 manual by Francesco Maria Guazzo

Compendium maleficarum, collected in 3 books from many sources, showing the iniquitous and execrable operations of witches against the human race, and the divine remedies by which they may be frustrated
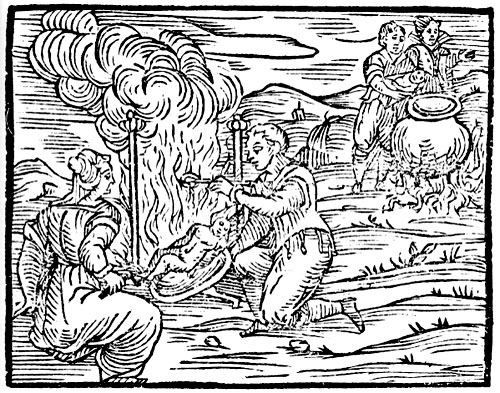
- illustration from the original edition
- Author: Francesco Maria Guazzo
- Translator: E. A. Ashwin
- Language: Latin
- Subject: witchcraft, demonology
- Genre: witch hunter manuals
- Publisher: Apud Haeredes August
- Publication date: 1608
- Publication place: Duchy of Milan
- English publication date: 1929
- Pages: 345
- ISBN: 978-84-8454-140-0
- OCLC: 561219090
- Original text: Compendium maleficarum, collected in 3 books from many sources, showing the iniquitous and execrable operations of witches against the human race, and the divine remedies by which they may be frustrated at Latin Wikisource

Compendium Maleficarum is a witch-hunter's manual written in Latin by Francesco Maria Guazzo, and published in Milan (present-day Italy) in 1608.

It discusses witches' pacts with the devil, and detailed descriptions of witches’ powers and poisons. It also contains Guazzo's classification of demons, based on a previous work by Michael Psellus.

== Contents ==
The work is extensive and divided into three books. The first one is dedicated to explaining what magic consists of and what types of magic exist. It also describes various practices of witchcraft, such as pacts with Satan, witches' sabbaths, and sexual encounters with incubi and succubi demons. The same volume includes Guazzo's classification of demons.

The second book is devoted to the diverse powers of witches, such as love spells, the creation of poisons and potions, and the ability to cause and cure diseases.

The third and final book explains the various ways in which witchcraft can be cured or removed. It also explains the difference between possession and bewitchment, and details how to recognize a person possessed by a demon.

== Second edition ==
There is a second edition of the Compendium Maleficarum, also authored by Francesco Maria Guazzo and published in 1626 by Stamperia del Collegio Ambrosiano. This edition is notably longer, with more chapters, examples and it includes an appendix with an exorcism.

== Translations ==
The book was not translated into English until 1929, when this was accomplished under the direction of the eccentric witchcraft scholar Montague Summers.
