= Étienne-Léon de Lamothe-Langon =

French writer (1786–1864)

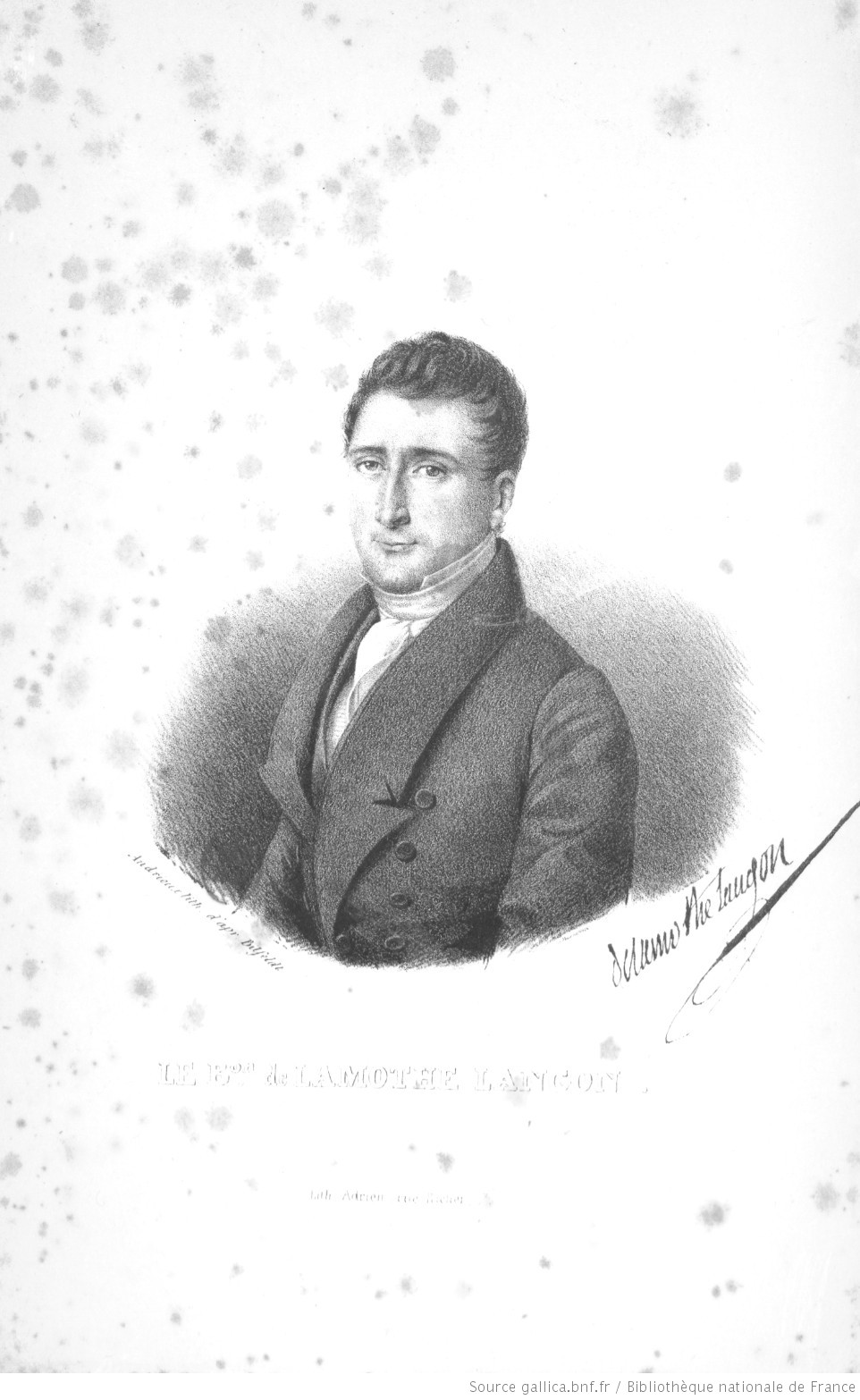
Étienne-Léon de Lamothe-Langon

Étienne-Léon de Lamothe-Langon (1786–1864) was a prolific French writer of many novels, apocryphal memoirs, and a controversial historical work.

== Biography ==
Étienne-Léon de Lamothe-Langon, a descendant of an old family of Languedoc, was born April 1, 1786, in Montpellier, He is first known under the name of Lamothe-Houdancourt, then as Étienne-Léon, Baron Lamothe-Langon. Until 1806 he lived in Toulouse, where he composed four tragedies, six comedies, a vaudeville, a drama, three short stories and two novels before moving to Paris.

In 1809 he became auditor 1st class of the Board of imperial state under Napoleon. He was appointed sub-prefect of Toulouse on July 11, 1811. He was sent to Italy as sous-préfet of Livorno on December 13, 1813, and took part in the Battle of Viareggio. This earned him the title of Baron of the Empire. During the Hundred Days he was prefect of Carcassonne. He was head of the Académie des Jeux Floraux in 1813, and on August 29 became member of the Toulouse Academy of Sciences.

During the Restoration he was sub-prefect of Saint-Pons-de-Thomières, but lost his job and suffered reverses of fortune which forced him to return to Toulouse and start writing to earn a living. He took an important part in writing biographies of Toulouse notables including members of his own family, for instance Gaillard de Lamothe, nephew of the Pope Clement V and Cardinal, and of his father, counselor in the Parliament of Toulouse, who had been guillotined July 6, 1794.

In 1824 he wrote with some success M. le Préfet which Stendhal calls "an admirable subject marred by a writer unable to take advantage of it." In 1826, Lamothe-Langon published a biography of the prefects of the 87 departments whose caustic portraits created "a success of scandal." In total he wrote sixty-five novels, sixteen memoirs, and the History of the Inquisition. His last work was a poem Wonders of Creation, May 11, 1838.

In 1844 he retired to Paris and lived near the Jardin des Plantes. He died April 24, 1864, and was buried in the cemetery of Limeil-Brévannes.

== History of the Inquisition in France ==
Lamothe-Langon's Histoire de l'Inquisition in France was published in 1829 and was one among many sources used by the German Joseph Hansen in his foundational history of the witchcraft trials Quellen und Untersuchungen zur Geschichte des Hexenwahns und der Hexenverfolung im Mittelalter (Bonn, 1901). Certain parts of Lamothe-Langon's history became controversial because their reliability was questioned in the 1970s by Norman Cohn and Richard Kieckhefer.

=== Inspiration ===
In the preface, Lamothe-Langon writes that inspiration came from witnessing the l'atroce persécution of the vénérable Juan Antonio Llorente, who, while in exile in Paris and had recently published (1817) a work on the inquisition in his native Spain, considered critical of the Church, was harassed over it. Lamothe-Langon hoped to delve into the French history of the inquisition as Llorente had delved into the Spanish: pour l'inquisition d'Espagne, ce que nous faisons aujourd'hui pour la nôtre (as he investigated the Spanish Inquisition, we should now examine our own).

In the preface, Lamothe-Langon also quotes at length from a much earlier history of the inquisition (1692) by Philipp van Limborch. (Llorente had also been inspired by Limborch, calling him the best and most exact of the previous writers on the subject.) Limborch wrote the passage in Latin, and Lamothe-Langon presents it in French by apparently translating it himself. The translated passage is of Limborch's introduction to the sentences of Dominican inquisitors Pierre de Claverie and Guillaume Julien, both working in Toulouse in the 14th century. (The original manuscripts copied by Limborch were thought to be lost, but were rediscovered in London at the British Library, Ms. ADD. 4697.)
