= Pierre Pigray =

French surgeon

Pierre Pigray was a French surgeon born in Paris in 1531. He was a student of the famous surgeon, Ambroise Paré before qualifying as a master surgeon in 1564. In addition to his service to the wounded in the Battle of Dreux (1562), Pigray was best known for being the surgeon-in-ordinary to King Charles IX, King Henri III, and King Henri IV. He died 16 October 1613.
