= Joseph Hansen (historian) =

German regional historian and archivist (1862–1943)

- Born: 26 April 1863; Aachen, Kingdom of Prussia
- Died: 29 June 1943 (aged 80); Cologne, Germany
- Occupation: Historian

Joseph Hansen (26 April 1863 – 29 June 1943) was an influential German historian of witchcraft persecutions, and an archivist in the city of Cologne, where at the age of 80 he was killed, along with his wife, by the bombs of World War II.

== Life, education and publications ==
Joseph Leonhard Hansen was born in 1863 in Aachen and studied at the Universities of Bonn, Berlin, and Münster, earning a doctorate in 1883. From 1891 until his retirement in 1927, he was director of the Historical Archive of the City of Cologne. From 1893 to 1927 he was also chairman of the Society for Rhenish History.

Hansen has been referred to as liberal and "freethinking." Hansen was raised Catholic in Aachen and resided in historically Catholic Cologne, with its famous Cologne Cathedral, nonetheless some have referred to him as "anti-clerical."

In 1900, Hansen published Zauberwahn, Inquisition und Hexenprozess im Mittelalter und die Entstehung der grossen Hexenverfolgung (Magical Illusion, Inquisition, and Witch Trials in the Middle Ages, and the Formation of the Larger Persecution of Witches) and the following year a companion volume of background materials was published (Quellen = Sources), Quellen und Untersuchungen zur Geschichte des Hexenwahns und der Hexenverfolgung im Mittelalter: Mit einer Untersuchung der Geschichte des Wortes Hexe (1901).

In 1905, Hansen published a German translation of Henry Charles Lea's three-volume History of the Inquisition in the Middle Ages.

In 1921, Hansen was elected a corresponding member of the Göttingen Academy of Sciences. In 1925, he was accepted as a corresponding member of the Prussian Academy of Sciences.

In 1943, age 80 Hansen and his wife Johanna (1872–1943) were killed in a bombing raid on Cologne.

== Influence on Witchcraft Studies ==
Wolfgang Behringer writes that Hansen "unquestionably delivered the consummate synthesis of previous witchcraft studies."

Two historians of witchcraft who were contemporaries of Hansen—GL Burr and GL Kittredge—both acknowledged the importance of Hansen. GL Burr writing in 1911 refers to Hansen as "the most eminent German scholar who has... given the world the most careful book on the rise of conception..." English professor GL Kittredge writing in 1907 was arguably forwarding an anti-thetical view to that of Hansen, yet quoted him at length in untranslated German.

Writing in 1965, Carlo Ginzburg refers to the "fundamental investigations of J. Hansen, more precisely, have demonstrated how the image of diabolical witchcraft, with all its appendages... was developed between the mid-thirteenth and mid-fifteenth centuries largely through the efforts of theologians and inquisitors... All this... has been documented exhaustively... Thus the goal of the present research is to document and build upon the approach to the question originally developed by Hansen."

In a lengthy 1967 essay on the European witch trials, Hugh Trevor-Roper frequently cites Hansen's "important" work. Historian HC Erik Midelfort refers to Hansen as "the great scholar" in his first work on witchcraft in Germany. Keith Thomas does not cite or refer to J. Hansen in his work on the subject of witchcraft "Religion and the Decline of Magic" though the title seems similar, albeit inverted, to Hansen's work from 1900. Writing a few years after K. Thomas, Richard Kieckhefer acknowledges "no small influence" from K. Thomas while relying heavily on the work of J. Hansen including over a hundred citations in the "Calendar of Witch Trials." Kieckhefer also joins Norman Cohn (1975) in expressing strong reservations toward one of Hansen's sources (Baron Lamothe-Langon see below).

Historians Alan Charles Kors and Edward Peters refer to Hansen as "the great archivist of Cologne" and consider his two works the most important scholarship from the turn of the century.

Despite their influence, Hansen's works were not translated into English during the 20th century.

In 2011, a work that tracked and translated into English a selection of the sources used by Hansen in Quellen was published by P. G. Maxwell-Stuart.

=== Questions Regarding A Source: Lamothe-Langon ===
In his work on witchcraft, Hansen relied on a vast number of sources and typically included lengthy quotations. These quotes are most often in the original ecclesiastical Latin, the lingua franca of Europe since the time of Jerome. In Zauberwahn these quotes are often placed within the footnotes, and they are featured prominently in the companion work Quellen ("sources"). With regard to one source, Baron Lamothe-Langon, Hansen writes that he consulted with Professor Ch. Molinier "the best expert on the inquisition in the south of France" who confirmed that archives used by Lamothe-Langon can no longer be found (nicht mehr aufzufinden sind). Under these circumstances (Unter diesen Umständen mussen) Hansen laments that he can therefore only provide the full extracts in French, as Hansen seems to believe that, before they were lost, the original Latin documents written by the inquisitors were roughly translated into French by Lamothe-Langon as he compiled a three volume work on the inquisition.

Writing in 1972, JB Russell follows Hansen in lamenting the missing Latin originals, and that "we must rely upon a summary translation, and though Lamothe-Langon was a careful scholar, we have no way of knowing what was the word he translated as 'sabbat'." The Latin word "sabbatum" occurs frequently in Jerome's Latin vulgate and would have been familiar to all within the medieval Church. Twelfth century inquisitors who were operating in Toulouse France sometimes referred to Waldensiens as Inzabbbatos. Use of the word "sabbatum" as a shorthand to represent a gathering of more than one witch seems most traceable to Francophone writers such as Pierre de Lancre (1612). Lamothe-Langon, also writing in French, may have helped spread the use of the word as shorthand, and Hansen uses it frequently writing in German. But most fifteenth, sixteenth, and seventeenth century writers who joined in the witchcraft debate seem to rarely, if ever, use the Latin "sabbatum" or vernacular derivatives thereof.

Writing in 1976, R Kieckhefer cites Russell's work and seems to have become intrigued by his comment regarding the word 'sabbat' but he departs from Russell's view of Lamothe-Langon as a reliable source: "What historians have failed to recognize, however, is that there is serious reason to believe that Lamothe-Langon's texts are forgeries." Kieckhefer bases this on "certain inaccuracies and anachronisms... In particular, Lamothe-Langon uses the word 'Sabbath' in rendering documents for fourteenth-century diabolical assemblies, though this word did not begin to displace the term 'synagogue' of 'synagogue of Satan' until well into the fifteenth century." Kieckhefer cites Russell (as quoted above) but does not provide other sources to support his claims regarding "Sabbath" or "synagogue" or "synagogue of Satan" or whether he means in Latin or a vernacular language. In a 2002 reprint of the same passage from the 1976 work by Kieckhefer, the citation of Russell is removed and replaced with a broad statement: "The Lamothe-Langon texts are now generally regarded as fakes." Kieckhefer points out that Norman Cohn shares his opinion (see below), and is careful to note their conclusions were reached independently. A citation that helps explain the serendipity is not included in the 2002 reprint but appeared in 1976: "Cohn and I both based our discoveries in large part on the biographical data in [Richard] Switzer's book of 1962."

=== Norman Cohn's Wider Criticism ===
Writing in 1975, Norman Cohn seems to go further than Kieckhefer. For Cohn, questions about the unreliability of Lamothe-Langon, originally based on a biography, seem to have moved from an intriguing and speculative theory into established fact, and Cohn broadens the issue from pertaining to a handful of documents into what he deems a "spectacular historical hoax." Under the heading "How the Great Witch-Hunt Did Not Start," Cohn lists a number of trials from 1275 to 1360, many of which are included in the work of Hansen (and Soldan), and Cohn claims they are all "false from start to finish. None of these things happened." However, a couple pages later, Cohn concedes that there was a "sole contemporary mention" of a witch trial around 1275" but this trial was for "simple sorcery." (Cohn doesn't provide the Latin term for "simple sorcery.")

Further on, Cohn again qualifies his initial statement and concedes yet another trial from the list did happen, "In 1329, the inquisitor of Carcassonne did sentence a monk to life imprisonment for practicing love magic..." Cohn doesn't provide his source for this "love magic" trial but it can be found in Quellen where Hansen cites the work of HC Lea and Lea includes the entire 1329 sentence reprinted in the original Latin. The 1329 sentence refers to...multas et diversas daemonum conjurationes et invocationes... and frequently uses the same Latin synonym for witch – sortilegia – found on the title page of Nicolas Rémy's work from 1595 where it is claimed that 900 persons were executed for sortilegii crimen. A Francophone writer and contemporary of Remy, Lambert Daneau, considers "sortilegus" to have been shortened to become the French "sorcier" and indeed sorciers was the term used in the title of another contemporary Jean Bodin in a witch-phobic work written in French in 1580.

Hansen notes that he verified Lea's transcription of the 1329 sentence in the archives at Paris: befinden sich in der Pariser Nationatalbibliothek Msc. Doat col. 27 p. 177, vol. 28 p. 161. In this same Paris archive, Hansen verified, via a separate trial, that the inquisitor named by Lamothe-Langon was operating in Carcassonne in 1276. Operating within Cohn's theory, such corroboration is unhelpful because Lamothe-Langon may have lifted the name from "a standard list of the inquisitors for Toulouse." Whereas Kieckhefer claims his skepticism is based in "anachronisms in the reports," Cohn seems to suggest the opposite: appearances of authenticity in Lamothe-Langon's accounts could be indicators he was selectively culling details from proper sources.

=== Old Partisan Battle: Soldan vs Grimm ===
It is not clear that withdrawing the Lamothe-Langon records in question would have a significant impact on Hansen's lengthy works from 1900 to 1901 or his broader thesis. Institutional partisans or those historians of witchcraft who share an affinity with the bottom-up view of Jakob Grimm, and oppose the top-down view of W.G.Soldan might have reason to highlight any potential embarrassment to Hansen due to his focus on the culpability at the top—the "kirche und staat" (church and state)-- and his selection and compilation of the surviving written record on the subject which almost exclusively comes from those sources.

A theory not based in the written record is difficult to source and will tend toward the speculative, as Kieckhefer notes:

"it is notoriously difficult to glean the beliefs of the illiterate masses..."

Following his critique of Lamothe-Langon, Norman Cohn seems to briefly advance a bottom-up view: "To the creation of the imaginary sect of witches, written works contributed very little." But on the following page Cohn qualifies this: "The origin of the new stereotype of the witch lay.. in the evidence extracted during the trials themselves." Cohn considers these confessions extracted under torture to have contained, at least on some occasions, a certain amount of real belief, but which he quantifies as a mere "grain of truth" while "the rest came from the imagination of certain inquisitors bishops and magistrates, who used and abused the inquisitorial procedure to obtain all the confirmation they needed." After a great deal of attention to Lamothe-Langon, Cohn seems to arrive a position that would not appear to be anti-thetical to the views expressed by Hansen.

== Works ==
Zauberwahn, Inquisition und Hexenprozess im Mittelalter, und die Entstehung der grossen Hexenverfolgung (1900)

Quellen und Untersuchungen zur Geschichte des Hexenwahns und der Hexenverfolgung im Mittelalter (1901)

== Other sources ==
German Wikipedia entry on Joseph Hansen
