= Francesco Maria Guazzo =

Italian priest and author

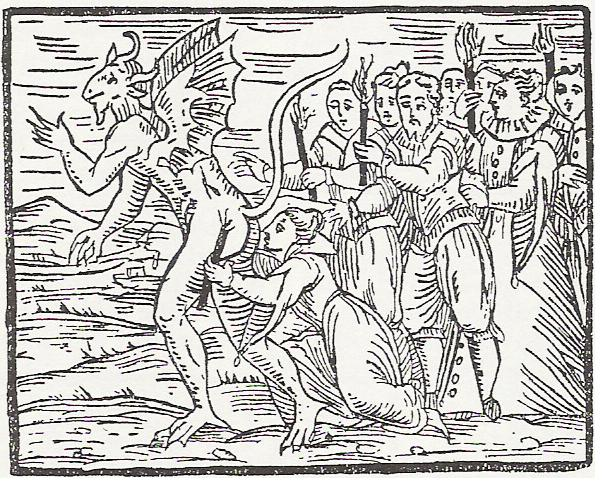
The Obscene Kiss, an illustration of witches kissing the Devil's anus from Francesco Maria Guazzo's Compendium Maleficarum (1608).

Francesco Maria Guazzo, aka Guaccio, aka Guaccius (1570–16??) was an Italian priest. He is known for authoring the Compendium Maleficarum.

== Life and work ==
He was a member of one of the oldest of the Catholic Ambrosian orders. These religious brotherhoods had appeared at various times since the 14th Century in and around the city of Milan and were quite plentiful, but the only one to attain more than simply local importance was the ‘Fratres Sancti Ambrosii ad Nemus’ sometimes known as 'The Brethren of the Grove'.

Before 1441 there were various monasteries that were canonically recognized under the name ‘Fratres Sancti Ambrosii ad Nemus’ but there was little link between them. However, in 1441 Pope Eugene IV merged them into one congregation called ‘Congregatio Sancti Ambrosii ad Nemus’ of which Francesco Maria Guazzo was a member under the papacy of Pope Sixtus V and Pope Paul V.

Guazzo was highly regarded in the field of possessions and demonology and the cures thereof.

During his life he is credited with performing several exorcisms including to members of several ducal and princely families, notably the bewitched Cardinal Charles of Lorraine and his relative, Eric, Bishop of Verdun.

On another occasion Guazzo was called to Düsseldorf in order to exorcise the mad John William, Duke of Jülich-Cleves-Berg (1562–1609). Guazzo first diagnosed possession, but after five months of unsuccessful attempts at spiritual healing and in the summer of 1604, the diagnosis was changed to bewitchment as the cause of the poor Duke’s mental illness. Guazzo had been sent to Düsseldorf by Duke Charles III of Lorraine (a family with which he had a long running association, having exorcised the Cardinal, Charles of Lorraine) on behalf of his daughter Antoinette (1569–1610), Duke Johann Wilhelm’s wife.

It was these direct experiences that inspired Guazzo to write his Compendium Maleficarum which was published in 1608 and was widely regarded among his contemporaries as the authoritative manuscript on Witchcraft. Within his text, Guazzo discusses witches’ pacts with the devil, detailed descriptions of witches’ powers and poisons and also prepared his classification of the demons based on a previous work by Michael Psellus.

In this work, Guazzo was greatly influenced by Duke Charles III of Lorraine’s leading lawyer and demonologist, Nicholas Remy (Remy produced one of the most important early works on demonology and witchcraft in 1595, Daemonolatreiae libri tres, and claimed to have sentenced to death over 900 people during witch trials between 1582–1592).

== Major works ==
- Compendium Maleficarum (1628; new edition London 1929, republished 2004 by Book Tree), limited preview online

== Bibliography ==
- Guazzo, Francesco Maria; Compendium Maleficarum; 1608
- Behringer, Wolfgang; Witches & Witchhunts. A Global History (Themes in History)); Polity; 2004
- Lindemann, Mary; Medicine & Society in Early Modern Europe; Cambridge University Press; 2010 (2nd edition);
- Samuel Macauley Jackson, Schaff-Herzog, Lefferts Augustine Loetscher; The New Schaff-Herzog Encyclopedia of Religious Knowledge, Volume 1; Baker Book House; 1984

== See also ==
- Daemonolatreiae libri tres
- Guazzo's classification of demons
- Witchcraft and children
