= Canon Episcopi =

Medieval canon law text

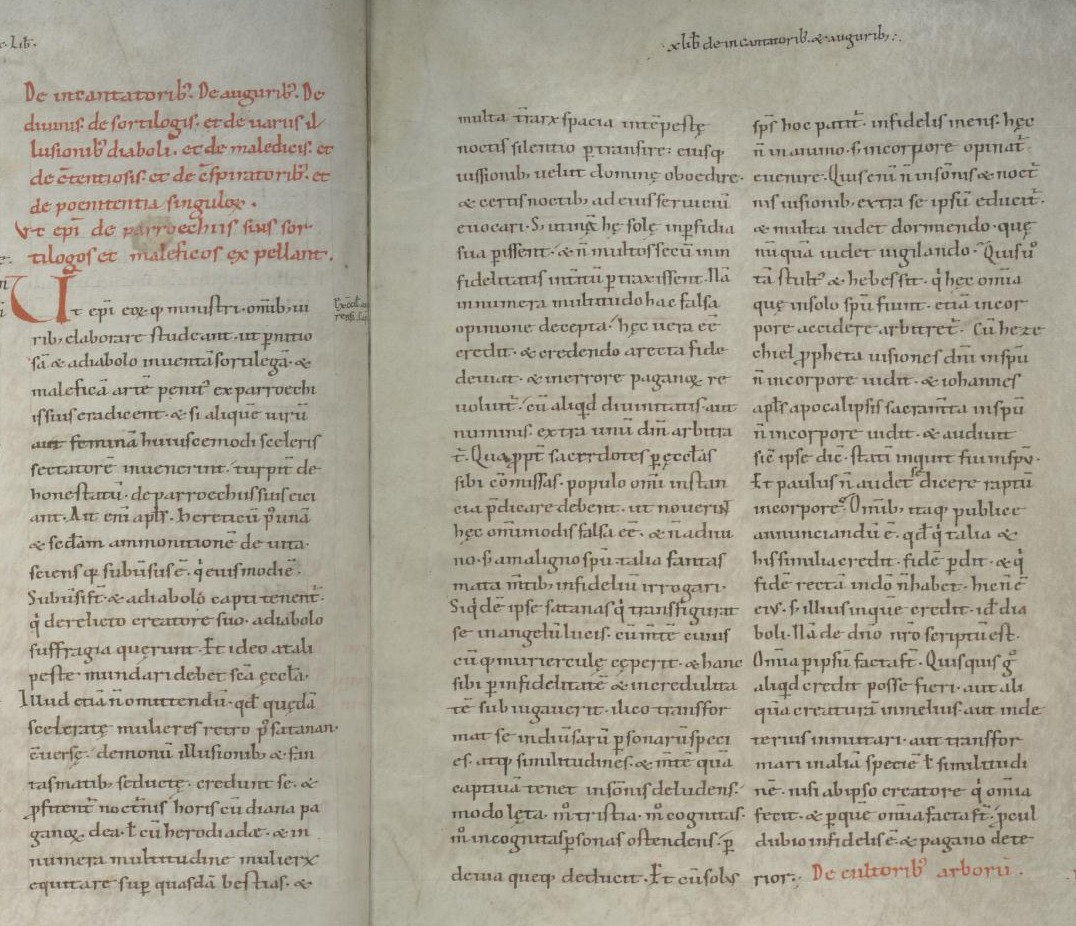
The text of the canon Episcopi in Hs. 119 (Cologne), a manuscript of Decretum Burchardi dated to ca. 1020.

The title canon Episcopi (or capitulum Episcopi) is conventionally given to a certain passage found in medieval canon law. The text possibly originates in an early 10th-century penitential, recorded by Regino of Prüm; it was included in Gratian's authoritative Corpus juris canonici of c. 1140 (Decretum Gratiani, causa 26, quaestio 5, canon 12) and as such became part of canon law during the High Middle Ages.

It is an important source on folk belief and surviving pagan customs in Francia on the eve of the formation of the Holy Roman Empire. The folk beliefs described in the text reflect the residue of pre-Christian beliefs about one century after the Carolingian Empire had been Christianized. It does not believe witchcraft to be a real physical manifestation; this was an important argument used by the opponents of the witch trials during the 16th century, such as Johann Weyer.

The conventional title "canon Episcopi" is based on the text's incipit, and was current from at least the 17th century.

== Textual history ==
It is perhaps first attested in the Libri de synodalibus causis et disciplinis ecclesiasticis composed by Regino of Prüm around 906. It was included in Burchard of Worms' Decretum (compiled between 1008 and 1012), an early attempt at collecting all of canon law.

The text was adopted in the Decretum of Ivo of Chartres and eventually in Gratian's authoritative Corpus juris canonici of c. 1140 (causa 26, quaestio 5, canon 12). Because it was included in Gratian's compilation, the text was treated as canon law for the remaining part of the High Middle Ages, until Roman Catholic views on European witchcraft began to change dramatically in the late medieval period. The text of Gratian is not the same as the one used by Burchard, and the distinctive features of the Corrector text were thus not transmitted to later times.

The text of Regino of Prüm was edited in Patrologia Latina, volume 132; the Decretum of Burchard of Worms in volume 140. The text of Burchard's Corrector has been separately edited by Wasserschleben (1851), and again by Schmitz (1898).

== Contents ==
The incipit of Gratian's text, which gave rise to the title of "canon Episcopi" reads:

Episcopi, eorumque ministri omnibus modis elaborare studeant, ut perniciosam et a diabolo inventam sortilegam et magicam artem ex parochiis suis penitus eradicent, et si aliquem virum aut mulierem hujuscemodi sceleris sectatorem invenerint, turpiter dehonestatum de parochiis suis ejiciant.
"The bishops and their ministers should by all means make great effort so that they may thoroughly eradicate the pernicious art of divination and magic, invented by the devil, from their parishes, and if they find any man or woman adhering to such a crime, they should eject them, turpidly dishonoured, from their parishes."

This condemnation the "pernicious art of divination and magic" (magicam being changed by Gratian from maleficam) is justified by a reference to Titus 3:10-11 on heresy. Then follows a description of the errors of "certain wicked women" (quaedam sceleratae mulieres), who deceived by Satan believe themselves to join the train of the pagan goddess Diana (to which Burchardus added: vel cum Herodiade "or with Herodias") during the hours of the night, and to cover great distances within a multitude of women riding on beasts, and during certain nights to be called to the service of their mistress. Those holding such beliefs are then condemned by the text in no uncertain terms ("that they would only perish in their perfidy without drawing others with them"), deploring the great number of people who "relapse into pagan error" by holding such beliefs.

The following paragraph presents an account of the means by which Satan takes possession of the minds of these women by appearing to them in numerous forms, and how once he holds captive their minds, deludes them by means of dreams.

The text emphasizes that the heretical belief is to hold that these transformations occur in the body, as only God could cause such change in creation.

The text proposes that it is perfectly normal to have nightly visions in which one sees things that are never seen while awake, but that it is a great stupidity to believe that the events experienced in the dream vision have taken place in the body. Examples are adduced, of Ezechiel having his prophetic visions in spirit, not in body, of the Apocalypse of John which was seen in spirit, not in body, and of Paul of Tarsus, who describes the events at Damascus as a vision, not as a bodily encounter.

== Reception ==
The Canon Episcopi has received a great deal of attention from historians of the witch craze period as early documentation of the Catholic church's theological position on the question of witchcraft.

The position taken by the author is that these "rides of Diana" did not actually exist, that they are deceptions, dreams or phantasms. It is the belief in the reality of such deceptions which is considered a heresy worthy of excommunication.

The position here is that the devil is real, creating delusions in the mind, but that the delusions do not have bodily reality. This skeptical treatment of magic sharply contrasts with the sanction of witch trials by the church in later centuries, beginning with the bull Summis desiderantes affectibus (1484).

The proponents of these trials were aware of this problem, and the authors of the Malleus Maleficarum, a witch-hunter's manual from 1487 that played a key role in the witch craze, were forced to argue for a reinterpretation of the Canon Episcopi in order to reconcile their beliefs that witchcraft was both real and effective as with those expressed in the Canon. Their detractors in the 16th and 17th century also made reference to the canon, e.g. Johann Weyer in his De praestigiis daemonum (1563).

Burchard of Worms added the New Testament figure Herodias to his copy of the document in one passage, and the Teutonic goddess Holda in another. In the 12th century, Hugues de Saint-Victor quoted the Canon Episcopi as reading "Diana Minerva". Later collections included the names "Benzozia" and "Bizazia". In modern times, the text's description of "Witches' Sabbaths" dedicated to Diana has given rise to a hypothesis concerning a supposed medieval witch religion, a theory mostly associated with Margaret Murray, and later adopted by Gerald Gardner and his followers. Burchard's mention of Herodias is relevant especially the theories of Charles Godfrey Leland presented in Aradia, or the Gospel of the Witches (1899), and taken up in the Stregheria of Raven Grimassi.
