= Richard Kieckhefer =

American academic, professor and author (born 1946)

- Born: 1946 (age 79–80)

Academic background
- Education: Saint Louis University; University of Texas at Austin

Academic work
- Discipline: Historian
- Sub-discipline: Medieval studies; history of religion; ritual magic; witchcraft; church architecture
- Institutions: Northwestern University

Richard Kieckhefer (born 1946) is an American medievalist, religious historian, scholar of church architecture, and author. He is Professor of History and John Evans Professor of Religious Studies at Northwestern University.

== Education ==
After an undergraduate education at Saint Louis University, Kieckhefer earned a PhD in history from the University of Texas in 1972, spending a year in Munich at the Monumenta Germaniae Historica Institute with the support of the German Academic Exchange Service (DAAD).

== Career ==
Kieckhefer has written on sainthood, medieval ritual magic, witchcraft, medieval and contemporary church architecture, hoopoes, and mystical literature; he has also edited and translated important texts from medieval Latin. He has taught at Northwestern University since 1975. His Magic in the Middle Ages, first published in 1989, has been translated into Spanish, German, Polish, Czech, Italian, and Greek, and is forthcoming in Turkish, Portuguese, and Korean. He was President of the American Society of Church History in 1997 and of the Societas Magica from 1995 to 2004.

== Awards ==
In addition to the DAAD, his research has been supported by the Guggenheim Foundation, the American Council of Learned Societies, and the National Endowment for the Humanities. In 2006, he was elected a member of the American Academy of Arts and Sciences.

== Works ==
- European Witch Trials: Their Foundations in Popular and Learned Culture, 1300–1500 (1976)
- Repression of Heresy in Medieval Germany (1979)
- Magic in the Middle Ages (1989)
- Forbidden Rites: A Necromancer's Manual of the Fifteenth Century (1997)
- Theology in Stone: Church Architecture From Byzantium to Berkeley (2004)
- There Once Was a Serpent: A History of Theology in Limericks (2010)
