= Mora witch trial =

Swedish witch trial

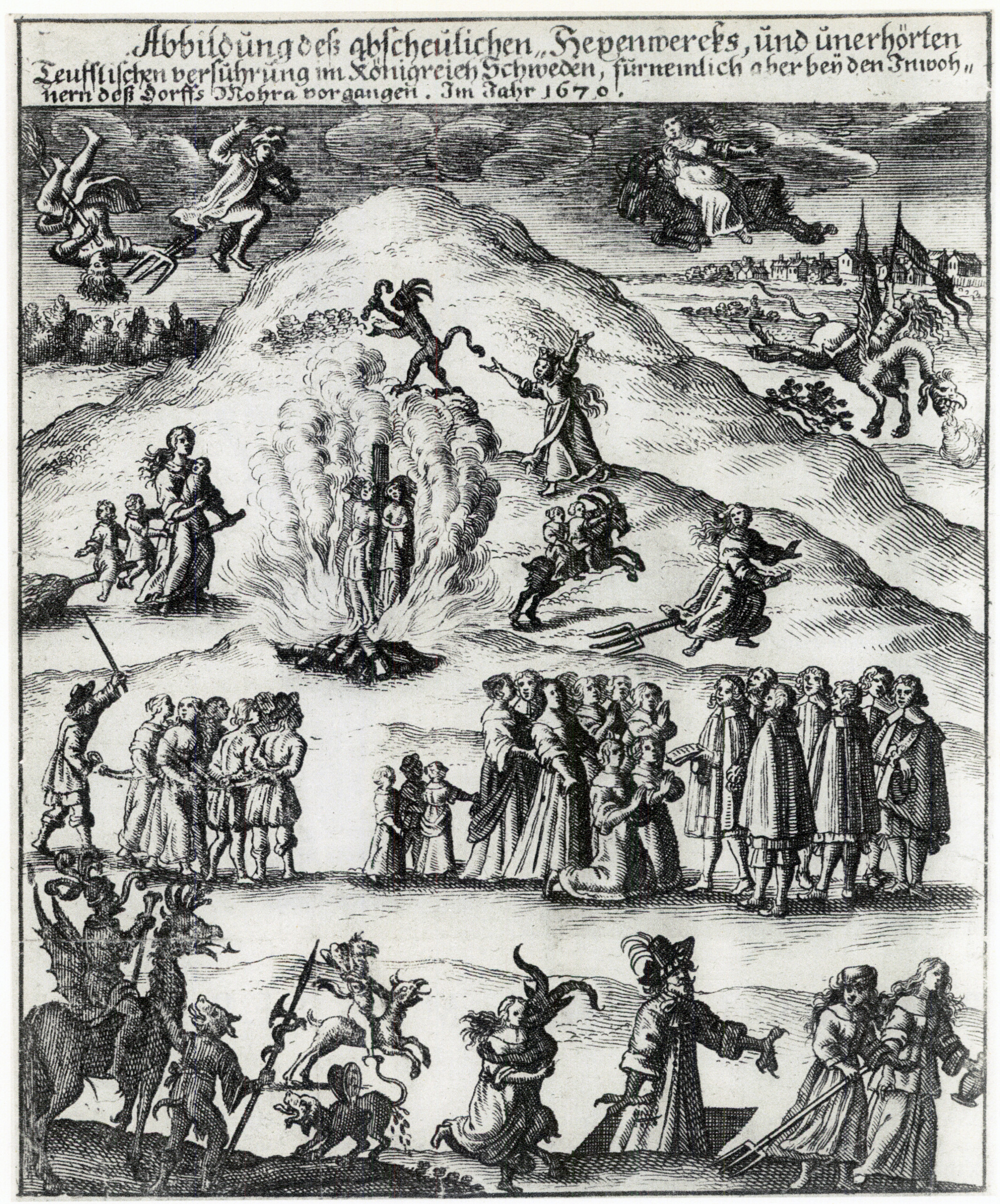
The famous German illustration of the Mora witch trial, 1670. In the illustration the condemned are executed by burning at the stake, which was a common execution method in witch trials in Germany, but did not in fact occur at the Mora witch trial.

The Mora witch trial, which took place in Mora, Sweden, in 1669, is the most internationally famous Swedish witch trial. Reports of the trial spread throughout Europe, and a provocative German illustration of the execution is considered to have had some influence on the Salem witch trials. It was the first mass execution during the great Swedish witch hunt of 1668–1676.

== Background ==
After the trial against Märet Jonsdotter in Härjedalen in 1668, rumours began to spread throughout Sweden that witches abducted children to the Witches' Sabbath of Satan in Blockula. This caused a hysteria among parents and a series of witch trials around the country, where children pointed out adults for having abducted them to take to Satan riding on cattle taken from the barns of wealthy farmers.

In Älvdalen, thirty people were put on trial and eighteen sentenced to death. The national court revoked eleven death sentences and executed six women and one man on 19 May 1669. These people were executed on the testimonies of children, which was to be common during this witch hunt.

== The trial ==
In March 1669, the hysteria reached Mora. The bailiff informed the governor: In Älvdalen and Mora, children and teenagers are being seduced by old witches unto the Devil. In June, distressed parents forced the governor to send a list of 35 children, claimed to have been abducted to Satan, to the capital with an appeal to send a commission to Mora to deal with the problem, because if: the old is not dealt with as it should, there is a risk that will become much worse than anyone can imagine. In May 1669, King Charles XI created a commission with instructions to use prayer to redeem the accused, rather than torture or imprisonment.

The commission, half of whose members consisted of priests, arrived at Mora on August 12, 1669 and, in front of three thousand spectators, convened a hearing on August 13. Over five days, 60 accused adults and numerous children were interrogated. The suffering children were examined and questioned one by one apart and it is said they all gave the same story. The witches claimed a devil called Locyta stopped them from confessing, but he left and allowed the witches to confess.

The witches confessed to many things and declared they used Enchanted Tools. When the judges asked to see some of their tricks, the witches could no longer do any magic. The judges declared that since the witches had confessed they could no longer practice witchcraft. The witches said the Devil was threatening them with an iron fork, and was going to throw them into a burning pit if they continued with their confessions. The official responsible for recording their statements openly admitted he did not bother writing down many of them, as they were all so similar. There were so many accused that the trials were conducted at two different locations in the village.

The evidence fell against the accused fell into three categories:

Transvection (magical levitation) to arrive at the sabbat (Witches' Sabbath) The location the children and witches went to they called Blockula.

Children reported being taken by witches and flying on goats, sticks, or even sleeping men.

Participation in the sabbat

Participation consisted of one or more of the following

Denial of God by cutting the finger and writing the name with blood in the devil's book.
Baptism by the devil.
Oath of fidelity. The witches threw filing of clocks into water and recited "As these filings of the clock do never return to the clock from which they are taken, so may my soul never return to heaven."
Banquet. The menu included "broth with coleworts and bacon in it, oatmeal, bread spread with butter, milk, and cheese."
Dancing, ending with "fighting one another."
Music and copulation.
Building a stone house to preserve the witches at the Day of Judgement, but the walls were perpetually falling down.

The Devil showed the children a terrifying dragon and told if they confessed anything the dragon would be let loose on them.

Participation in the maleficia (malignant acts) proposed at the sabbat

Based only on this testimony from children, on August 23 the commission identified seventy adult witches, twenty-three of whom confessed and were executed on August 25 with the remaining forty-seven sent to Falun for later execution. In addition, fifteen children were executed with fifty-six children sentenced to various other corporal punishments such as "running the gauntlet" or being lashed with rods. The number of seduced children was about 300.

== The condemned at the Mora witch trial ==
- Nisses Anna (70 years)
- Jerp Anna from Oxberg (50 years)
- Anders Perssons Anna from Selja (50 years)
- Sol Märet from Selja (58 years), sister of Anders Perssons Anna
- Enghies Anders from Morkarlby (40 years), the only man executed
- Finnes Anna from Morkarlby (70 years), known as "the old sorceress"
- Finnes Märet from Östnor (70 years), sister of Finnes Anna.
- Hära Kerstin from Vika (79 years)
- Butu Margareta from Våmhus (50 years)
- Hindrick Lasses Karin from Våmhus (40 years)
- Hollnus Olofs Brita from Våmhus (36 years)
- Ask-Elin from Våmhus (50 years)
- Mats Hanssons Anna from Bonäs (60 years)
- Hede Hans Märet from Bonäs (70 years)
- Bäcke Pers Karin from Våmhus (26 years) (execution suspended because of pregnancy)
- Knubb Eriks Anna from Våmhus (35 years) (execution suspended because of pregnancy)

Six other death sentences were suspended because of unclarity, a good reputation and the hope of improvement—among them also a man, Sven Maas from Selja.

== The execution ==
The execution took place on 24 August 1669. The condemned were to be decapitated, after which their corpses were to be burnt at the stake. The report of the execution describes the event: The sinners walked quickly, except the two last ones, who began to sigh and moan, although not such as to delay the procession. The stakes had been built opposite the church on a sandy peninsula on the other side of the river. On the place of execution, the fourteen women and the man were decapitated with an axe, and their corpses were lifted up unto the stakes: first seven on the first stake, five at the second and three at the third, a terrifying spectacle, and burnt.

A boy was sentenced to running the gauntlet between the other village boys and 148 children were whipped. Thereafter, the commission left Mora. Additionally six women were subsequently executed.

== Aftermath ==
The vicar continued to send complaints to the governor about witches. In December 1669, another 60 stood accused of sorcery in Mora, but the local authorities were no longer willing to conduct any witch trials: the harder you conduct these things, the more dangerous it becomes, wrote the governor, and the more difficult it seems to me to be able to separate the guilty from the innocent. Therefore, no one was sentenced to a punishment harsher than a whipping.

In February 1670, the governor complained that there was suddenly talk of witches everywhere, and that this hysteria was spreading like fire in dry grass. Vicars were constantly writing to him asking for more witch trials, but he refused and advised them to preach to the suspected witches instead. The government gave the order that a special prayer, the witch prayer, was to be held in the churches of the kingdom: that prayer was said from 1670 to 1677.

The Mora witch trial was the first mass witch trial in the great Swedish witch hunt and, in the following years, it grew until it reached its peak in the Torsåker witch trials of 1675, and stopped after the execution of Malin Matsdotter in the capital. Descriptions of the trials appeared in Balthasar Bekker's De Betoverde Weereld (1691) (translated into English as The World Bewitched, (1695)) as well as Joseph Glanvill's Saducismus Triumphatus (1683). The famous German illustration of the execution depicts the event incorrectly, as it depicts the condemned being executed by burning alive, as they were in Germany, rather than decapitated, as they were in Sweden.
