= Anna Lundh =

Swedish television personality, adventurer and model

Anna Pushab Lundh
- Born: 5 April 1987 (age 39); Mora, Dalarna, Sweden
- Occupation: TV personality
- Known for: Robinson: 2009, Miss Earth Sweden 2007
- Television: "Outsiders" (TV3); "Robinson: 2009" (Tv4), "Hål i Väggen" (Tv6), "Eftersnack" (SVT), "101 sätt att åka ur en gameshow" (TV3)...

Anna Lundh (born 5 April 1987) is a Swedish television personality, adventurer and model. Anna Lundh first gained notability in 2009 when participating in and becoming a top finalist in the tenth Swedish season of Survivor.

== Early life ==
Anna Lundh was born and raised in the locality Gesunda, in Mora Municipality, Dalarna County.

Anna Lundh was the second youngest out of the 4 siblings in her family. About her childhood, Anna Lundh has stated that one of the happiest moments growing up was the birth of her youngest brother.

Anna Lundh's major childhood influences included the Swedish author and screenwriter Astrid Lindgren, who is best known for the Pippi Longstocking book series. Aside from being inspired by Astrid Lindgren's work, Anna Lundh also admired Astrid Lindgren's support for children's and animal rights, the author's opposition to corporal punishment, her commitment to justice, non-violence and understanding of minorities as well as Astrid Lindgren's love and caring for nature.

As a little girl, Anna Lundh used to sit glued in front of the television and long for being a contender in "Survivor" Sweden - (known as "Expedition Robinson"). The show was however cancelled before Anna Lundh became old enough and eligible for participation. Instead Anna Lundh began her television career on a show named "Outsiders".

Like typical high school students, Anna Lundh was interested in pursuing a diverse range of future careers. She wanted to become a veterinarian and work with animals, a hair dresser, school teacher, police or an actress.

By the age of sixteen, Anna Lundh was part of an extreme sports stunts duo with her friend Erika Söderman. Erika Söderman, who is a high performance precision driver and Guinness World Records holder, tilted a rolling car over on two wheels, allowing Anna Lundh to climb up on the side of the car so that both performed daring balancing acts.

== Education ==
Anna Lundh attended elementary school at Sollerö Skola from kindergarten through grade 1-6. After junior high school, Anna Lundh specialized in social sciences at college-preparatory school where she graduated with honors.

== Career ==
During her adolescence and after graduation, Anna Lundh worked as a cashier (checkout assistant), lifeguard, ticket seller, waste manager, waitress, youth leader, substitute teacher and kindergarten teacher.

In 2008, Anna Lundh applied to the revived event show "Survivor", produced by ITV Studios Nordic for Sweden’s largest TV channel, TV4. Anna Lundh and 17 individuals were chosen out of 9,000 candidates. The shortlist of the thoroughly vetted contenders was released by TV4 on 12 January 2009. The show was filmed in the Philippines.

Subsequent to successfully becoming a top finalist in 2009, Anna Lundh began working extensively as a media personality, performing alongside a string of other celebrities, international All-stars and champions, such as Glenn Hysén, Ralf Edström and Thomas Ravelli. Anna Lundh is maintaining this career.

In October 2011, Anna Lundh traveled to Seoul, Korea, after having been chosen by the Miss Supertalent of the World 2011 to represent Sweden. The final was held on October 15. Anna Lundh placed among the top 10 women among 50 candidates. Anna Lundh commented that she saw the top placement and results as a bonus, next to the privilege of representing Sweden, making new friends and learning about other cultures.
