= Martis Karin Ersdotter =

Swedish businesswoman

Martis Karin Ersdotter (Våmhus, 2 July 1829 – 5 January 1902, Våmhus) was a Swedish businesswoman from Våmhus in Dalarna. She is the best known of the Hårkulla ("Hair-kulla"), the famous category of travelling businesswomen from Dalarna who manufactured and sold hair jewellery all over Europe in the 19th century.

== Life and career ==
Martis Karin Ersdotter was born in Våmhus parish in Dalarna.

As other hårkullor, she made business trips in Europe to sell her products, and she was to become perhaps the most successful of these. She was a supplier of hair jewellery to Queen Victoria, whom she met during a business trip to Scotland. She used the fact that the queen was her client in her business and had it printed on her business cards, many of which are preserved from the 1850s.

Martis Karin Ersdotter married Martis Mats Andersson and became the mother of Anna Matsdotter (1862-1943) and the maternal grandmother of Eric Wickman.
