= Vinäs =

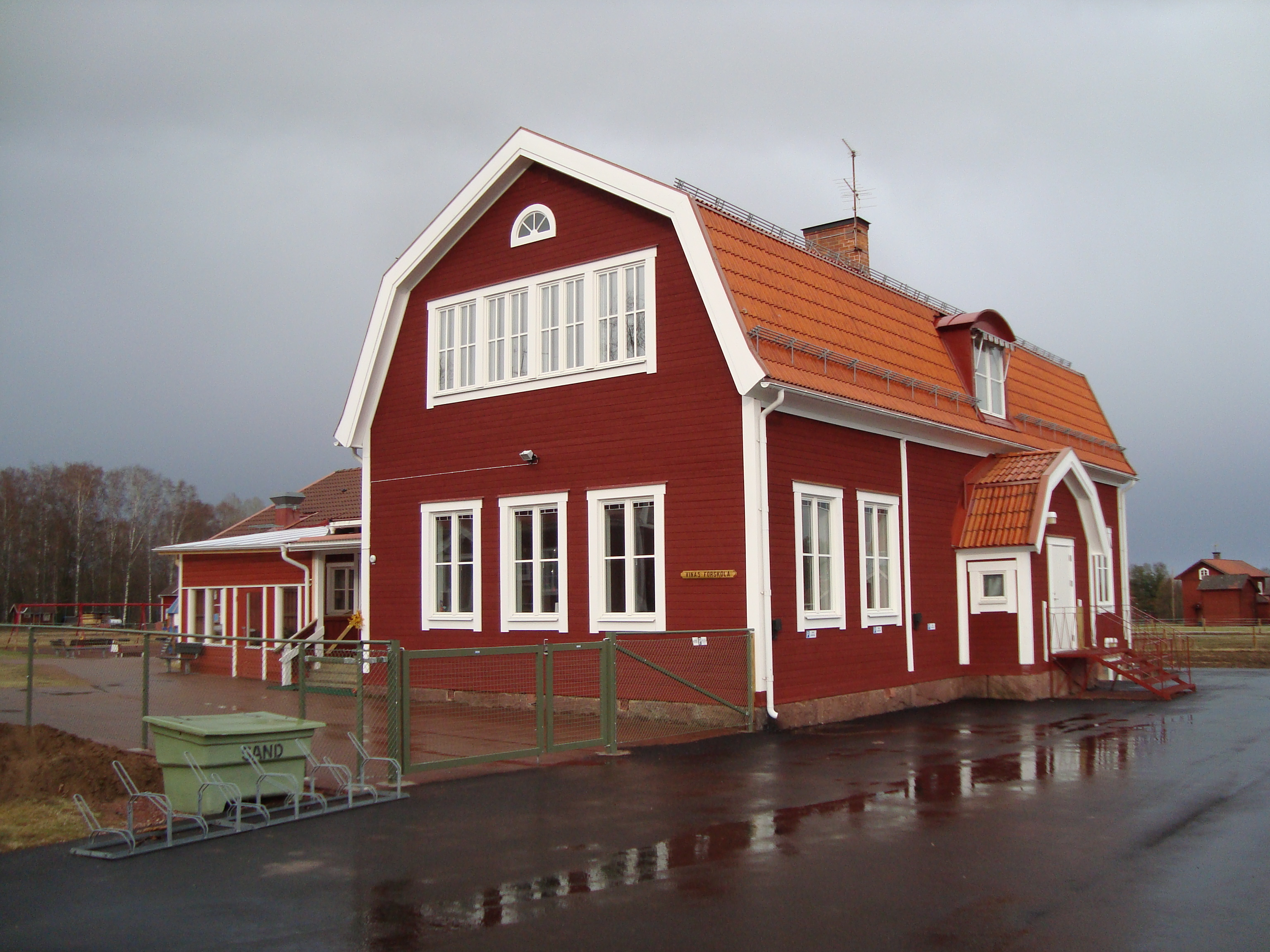

- Location within Dalarna Location within Sweden
- Coordinates: 60°58′18″N 14°32′28″E
- Country: Sweden
- Province: Dalarna
- County: Dalarna County
- Municipality: Mora Municipality

Area
  - Total: 0.87 km^{2} (0.34 sq mi)

Population (31 December 2010)
  - Total: 329
  - Density: 376/km^{2} (970/sq mi)
- Time zone: UTC+1 (CET)
  - Summer (DST): UTC+2 (CEST)

Vinäs is a locality situated in Mora Municipality, Dalarna County, Sweden, with 329 inhabitants in 2010.
