= Eric Wickman =

Swedish-American entrepreneur

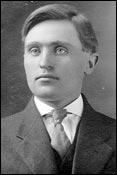
- Carl Eric Wickman
- Born: 7 August 1887; Våmhus, Sweden
- Died: 5 February 1954 (aged 66); Daytona Beach, Florida, U.S.
- Resting place: Lakewood Cemetery
- Other names: Erik Wretman (birth name)
- Known for: Founder of Greyhound Lines

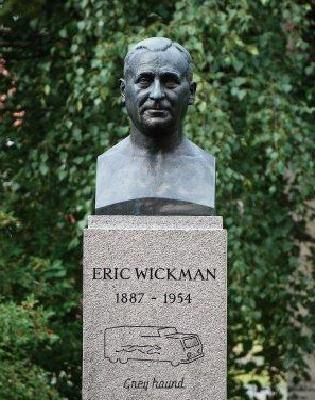
Eric Wickmanbust in Våmhus Sculptor Arvid Backlund

Carl Eric Wickman (born Erik Wretman; 7 August 1887 – 5 February 1954) was a Swedish-born businessman who was the founder of Greyhound Lines.

== Background ==
Wickman was born Erik Wretman at Martisgården, a family farm located near the small village of Limbäck in the parish of Våmhus, 15 km north of Mora in the province Dalarna, Sweden. He was the son of farmer Karl Viktor Wretman (1858-1947) and Anna Matsdotter (1862-1943) and the maternal grandson of hair jewelry artist Martis Karin Ersdotter. He was the eldest of five siblings and was commonly known as Martis Jerk ("Martis" is the farm name and "Jerk" is the dialectal form of the name Erik).

He changed his name to Carl Eric Wickman in 1905, when he arrived in the United States as a Swedish emigrant. His father Victor had earlier used the surname Wickman when he worked in the United States.

== Career ==
Wickman worked in a mine as a drill operator in Hibbing, Minnesota until he was laid off in 1914. In the same year, Wickman became a Hupmobile salesman as a partnership-owner. When he could not sell the first Hupmobile he received, he began operating a livery route from Hibbing and Alice, Minnesota. By using the seven multi-seat Hupmobile, he drove his former colleagues between the mines and homes. This was the start of what would later become the largest bus line in the United States, renamed "Greyhound Lines" in 1914.

In 1925, he bought a small line operating out of Superior, Wisconsin that was owned by Orville Swan Caesar (1892–1965). Within a year, the duo formed Northland Transportation Company. The company formally changed its name to The Greyhound Corporation in 1930. By 1934, he had expanded to 50 buses and had revenues of $340,000. Wickman retired as president of Greyhound Corporation in 1946. In 1952, he sold his interest in the business for $960,000.

== Personal life ==
In 1916, Wickman married Olga Rodin (1897–1977). They had two children Bob (Robert) and Peggy (Margaret). In 1940 King Gustav V of Sweden awarded Wickman with the Order of Vasa, first class.

He died on February 5, 1954, aged 66, in Daytona Beach. He was buried at Lakewood Cemetery in Minneapolis.

== Companies founded ==
- Mesaba Transportation Company – 1915
- Motor Transit Corporation – 1922
- Northland Transportation Company – 1925
- Greyhound Pacific – around 1930
- The Greyhound Corporation – 1930

== Additional sources ==
- Jackson, Carlton (1984) Hounds of the Road: A History of the Greyhound Bus Company (Popular Press) ISBN 978-0-87972-271-5
- Lundell, Kristin (2014) Busskungen- Svensken som grundade Greyhound (Stockholm: Norstedts) ISBN 978-9-11306-121-4
- Sundquist, Nils (1969) Martis Jerk, Eric Wickman 1887-1954: Våmhuspojken Som Blev USA:s Busskung (Malung: Malungs Boktryckeri AB)

== Related reading ==
- Lewis, Anne Gillespie (2004) Swedes in Minnesota (Minnesota Historical Society Press) ISBN 978-0-87351-753-9
