= Nusnäs =

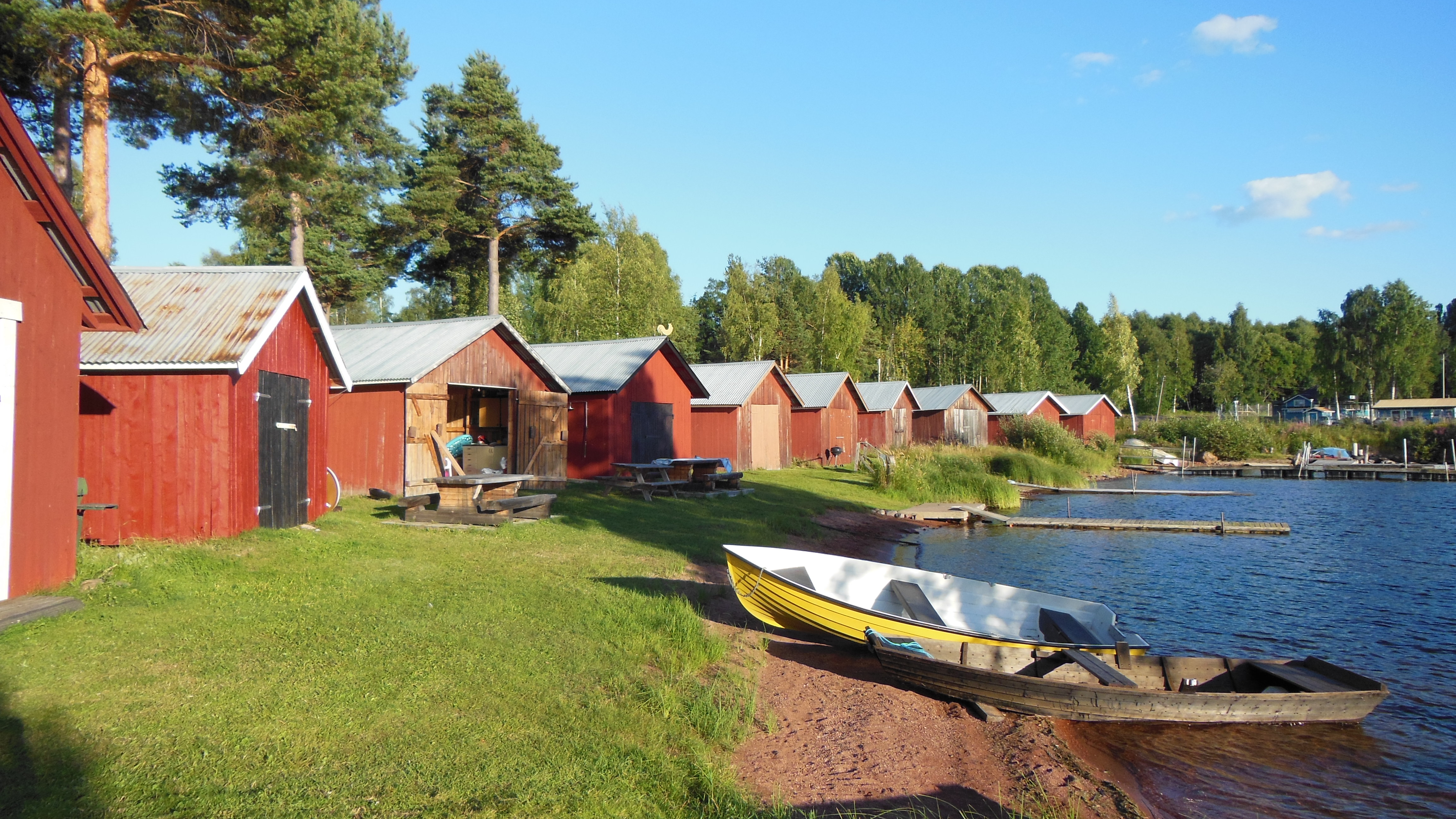

- Location within Dalarna Location within Sweden
- Coordinates: 60°58′N 14°38′E
- Country: Sweden
- Province: Dalarna
- County: Dalarna County
- Municipality: Mora Municipality

Area
  - Total: 2.17 km^{2} (0.84 sq mi)

Population (31 December 2010)
  - Total: 729
  - Density: 336/km^{2} (870/sq mi)
- Time zone: UTC+1 (CET)
  - Summer (DST): UTC+2 (CEST)

Nusnäs is a locality situated in Mora Municipality, Dalarna County, Sweden with 729 inhabitants in 2010. It is also a notable producer of Dalarna Horses
