= Gopshus =

- Location within Dalarna Location within Sweden
- Coordinates: 61°5′54″N 14°14′11″E
- Country: Sweden
- Province: Dalarna
- County: Dalarna County
- Municipality: Mora Municipality

Area
  - Total: 0.67 km^{2} (0.26 sq mi)

Population (31 December 2010)
  - Total: 55
- Time zone: UTC+1 (CET)
  - Summer (DST): UTC+2 (CEST)

Gopshus is a locality in Mora Municipality, Dalarna county in Sweden, with 55 inhabitants in 2010. It is located on the southern shore of Österdalälven, north-west of Mora. In 2010, Statistics Sweden decided that Gopshus would no longer be classified as a village for statistical purposes, as the distance between houses was greater than 150 metres.

The earliest mention of Gopshus is from 1539, in a list of farmers who owed tax-in-kind in the form of squirrel pelts. The documents show that at that time Gopshus was already relatively large and prosperous in terms of how many heads of cattle were owned by local farmers, although not exactly rich.

The ski marathon Vasaloppet passes through Gopshus, and the alpine skiing club Mora Alpina uses a ski slope in Gopshus for training and competitions.
