= Dala horse =

Traditional Swedish carved, painted wooden horse statuette

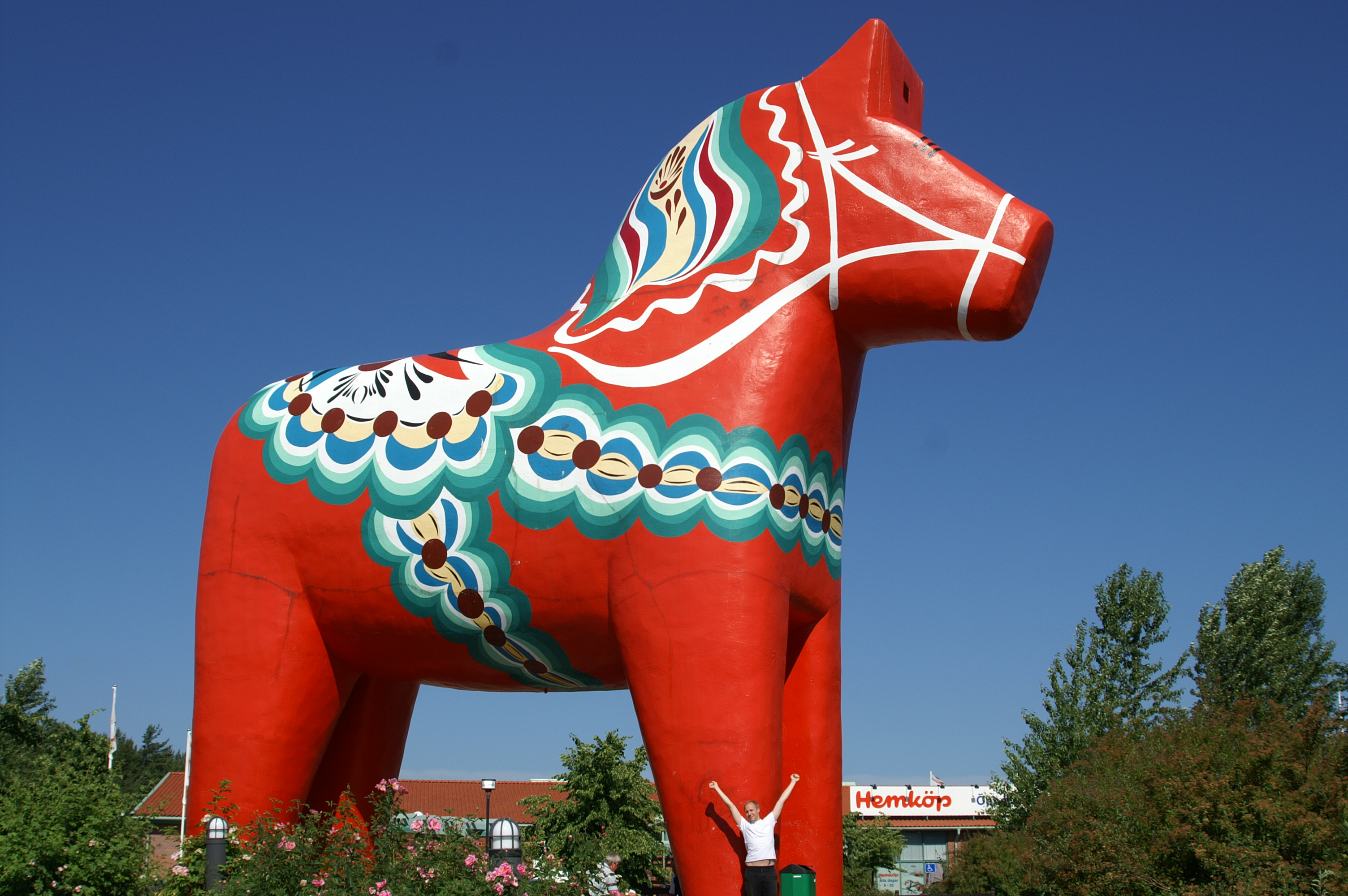
The world's largest Dala horse, made of concrete and located in Avesta, Sweden.

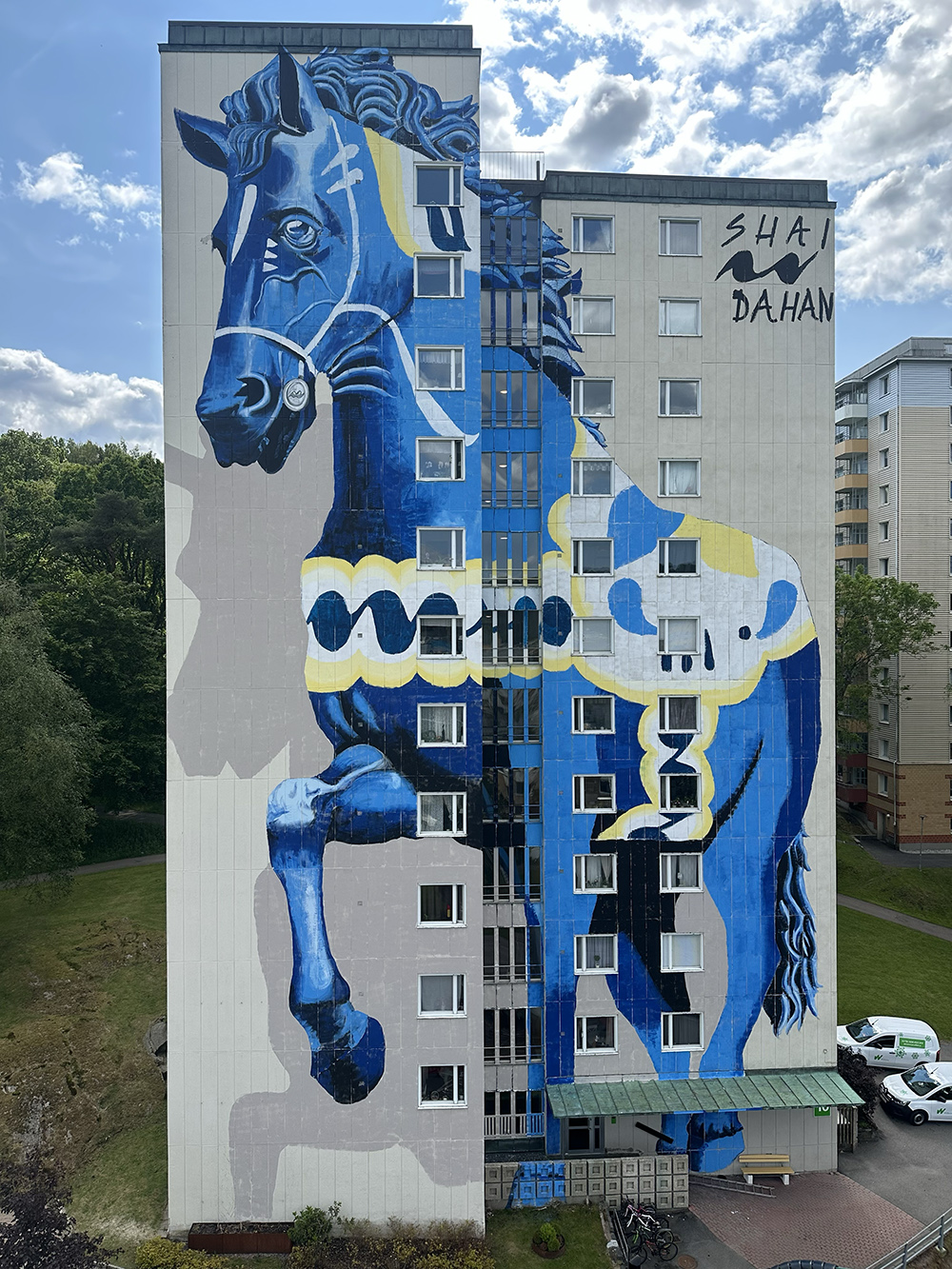
World's largest Dala horse painting, painted by Shai Dahan

A Dala horse (Swedish: dalahäst) or Dalecarlian horse is a traditional carved, painted wooden statuette of a horse originating in the Swedish province of Dalarna (Dalecarlia). The Dala horse has been widely used as a toy for children. It has also become a symbol of Dalarna, as well as of Sweden in general.

Several types of Dala horses are made with distinguishing features common to the locality of the site where they are produced. One particular style has, however, become much more common and widespread than others. It is stoutly carved and was traditionally painted Iron oxide red at first. Now it is usually reddish orange with details and a harness in white, green, yellow and blue.

In 2026, it was awarded Protected Geographical Indication (PGI) in the European Union.

== History ==
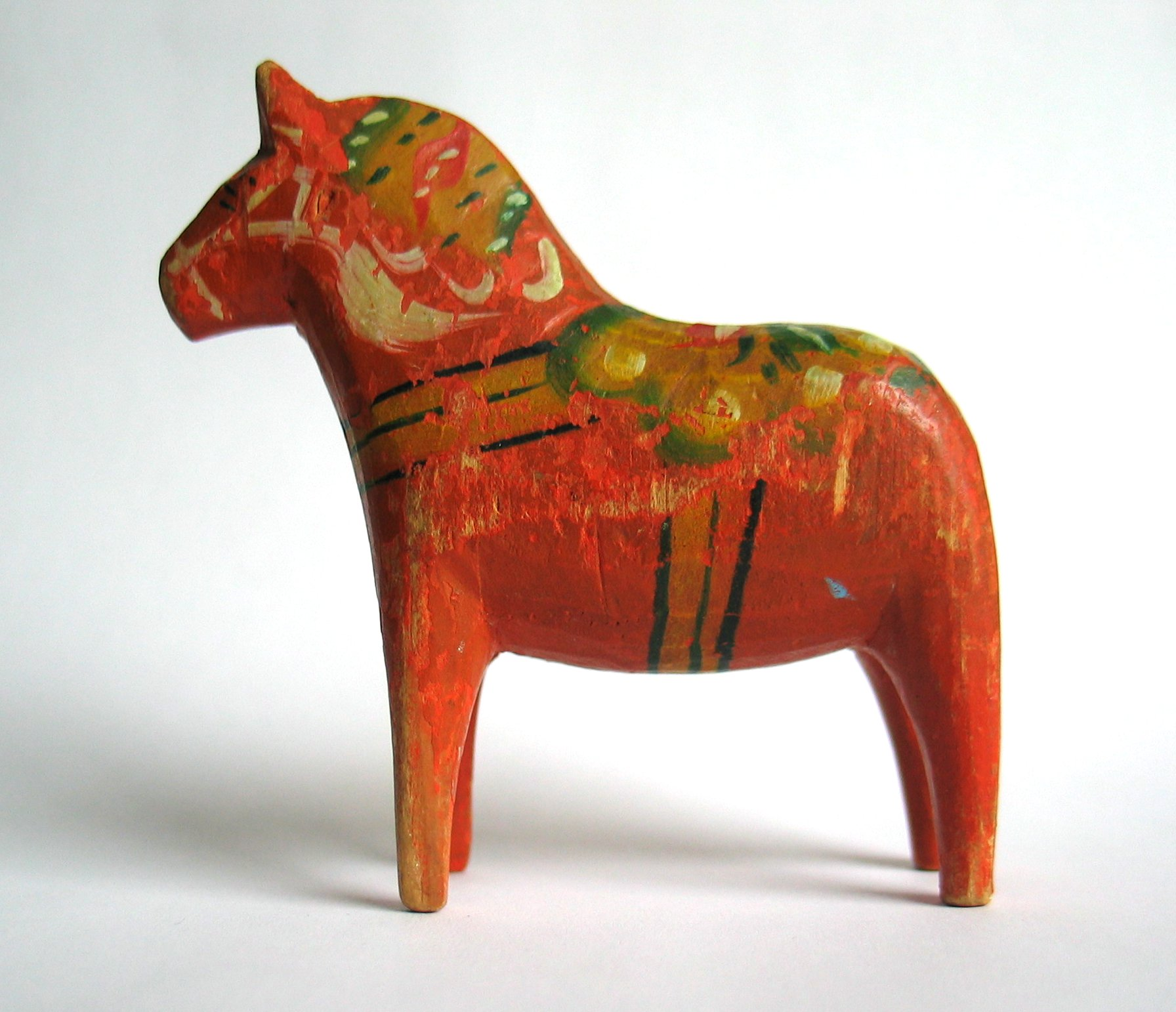
The wooden horses are painted in the kurbits style. This one is from around 1950.

The carving of Dala horses as a livelihood is thought to have started in the village of Bergkarlås in central Sweden, though the nearby "horse" villages of Risa, Vattnäs, and Nusnäs were also centres of horse-making. The villages were involved in the art of furniture and clock-making, and it is likely the leftover scraps of wood were put to use in the production of Dala horses. Many early Dala horses were not painted at all, but in the beginning of the 19th century painting them in a single color, white or red, became common practice. The decoration of the Dala horse has its roots in furniture painting and was perfected over the years. According to a local tale, a wandering painter in the style of kurbits came across one of these Dala horses in a farm he was decorating. When asked by one of the children why that horse was not as beautifully painted as the ones in the decorations, he painted the Dala horse in the same style. This tradition was then carried on in order to raise the market value of the Dala horses.

The earliest references to wooden horses for sale are from 1623. In the 19th century,Stikå Erik Hansson from the village Risa in the parish of Mora introduced the technique of painting with two colours on the same brush, still used today. In the book "The Wooden Horses of Sweden," the author mentions that this famous Dala painter is buried in a small churchyard in Nebraska after having immigrated to the Midwest in 1887 at the age of 64. He changed his name to Erik Erikson upon coming to America and is buried at Bega Cemetery in Stanton County Nebraska, outside of Norfolk.

While there were many horse whittlers in the early production of Dala horses, there were comparatively few horse painters. The large number of whittlers and a lack of distinguishing features makes it difficult to distinguish between different whittlers. Early painters very rarely signed their work, but they did have their own distinct pattern from which it is often possible to identify who painted a particular horse. In the 1930s, (especially after the World's Expo in Paris 1937 and World's Fair in New York 1939 in which Dala horses were shown) mass production of Dala horses started. This marks the beginning of a new era for the Dala horse, transitioning from toy to a national symbol and popular souvenir.

The Dala horse of today is still a handcrafted article, made of pine, and its pattern is about 150 years old. At least nine different people contribute their skills to create each horse. The distinctive shape of the horse is due to the usage of flat-plane style carving.

=== Folklore and popular culture ===
An apocryphal legend of the Dala horse is that they became the national toy in 1716. According to the legend, soldiers loyal to King Charles XII were quartered in Dalarna and carved the toys as gifts for their hosts.

In the 2003 Norwegian film Kitchen Stories, a small Dala horse is part of a joke when a character expected a real horse as a reward.

== Geographical differences ==
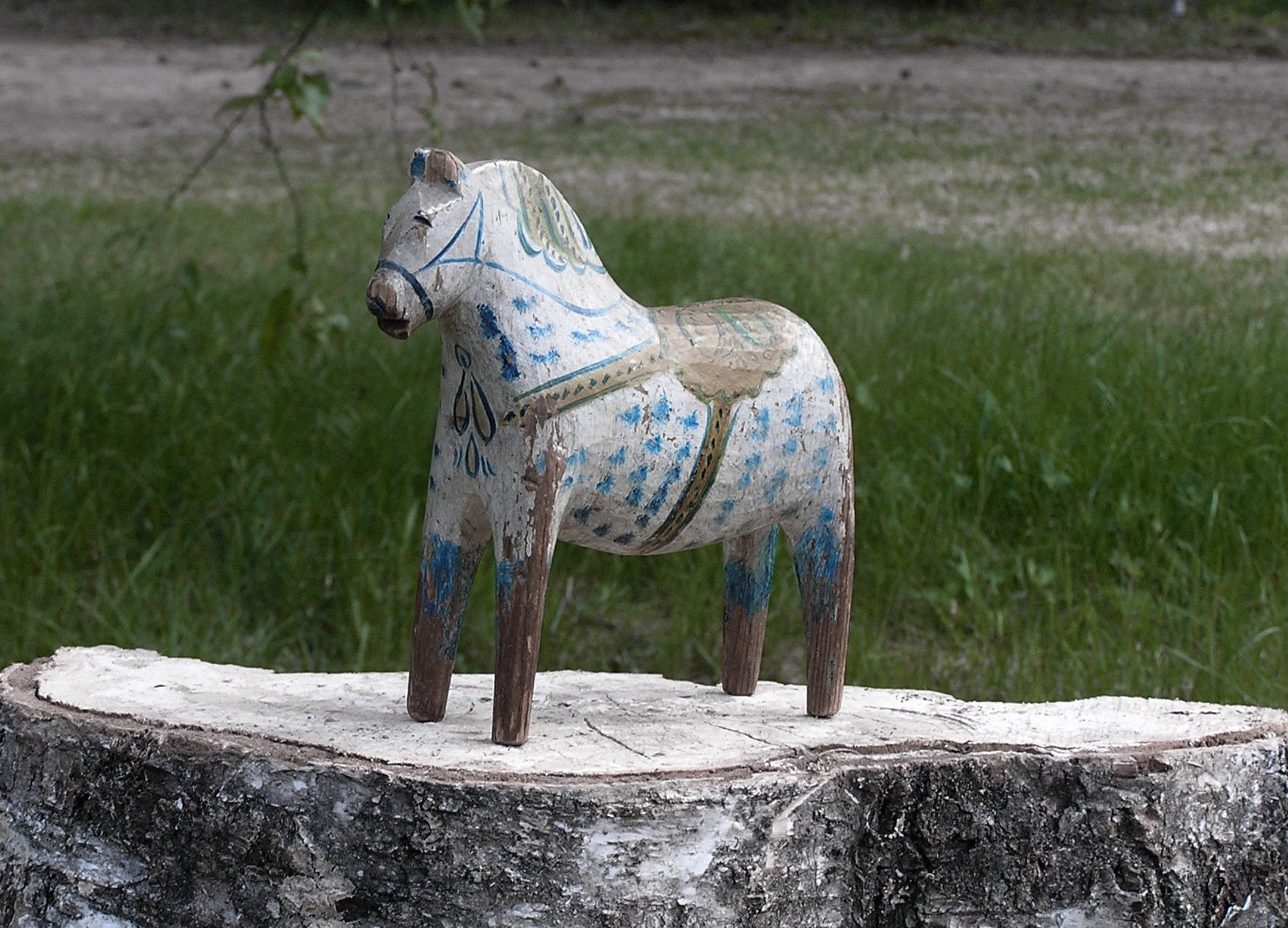
A Dala horse painted by Rytter Olof Matsson, Risa, around 1910.

Early production of Dala horses was concentrated to four villages: Bergkarlås, Risa, Vattnäs, and Nusnäs, all in the parish of Mora. Production is believed to have started in Bergkarlås and later spread to nearby villages Risa and Vattnäs through kindred. At about the same time production started independently in Nusnäs, and being farther away their style was less influenced by those of the other villages. The individual painters each had their particular style, and the few who are old enough to remember first- or second-hand the history can often tell which village, and in some cases which carver or painter, turned out a particular horse. The distinguishing features of many early painters from these villages have now been documented.

Many of the works by the earliest horse makers are no longer in existence but those that remain are cherished by their owners and have often been passed down through generations. These are also coveted by collectors, and their value has risen markedly over the years.

Today, many of the villages in Dalarna county make Dala horses with individual styles representing the district of origin. These horses also have distinctive shapes and often come in different sizes. Some horses like the Nusnäs horse are stocky work horses; others are lean and upright with stately countenance like the Rättvik horse. Many of these can be seen at a yearly exhibition (since the year 2000), which is held at Klockargården in Leksand, Sweden. Currently, about forty present carvers and painters show their Dala horses and put them up for sale.

== Production ==
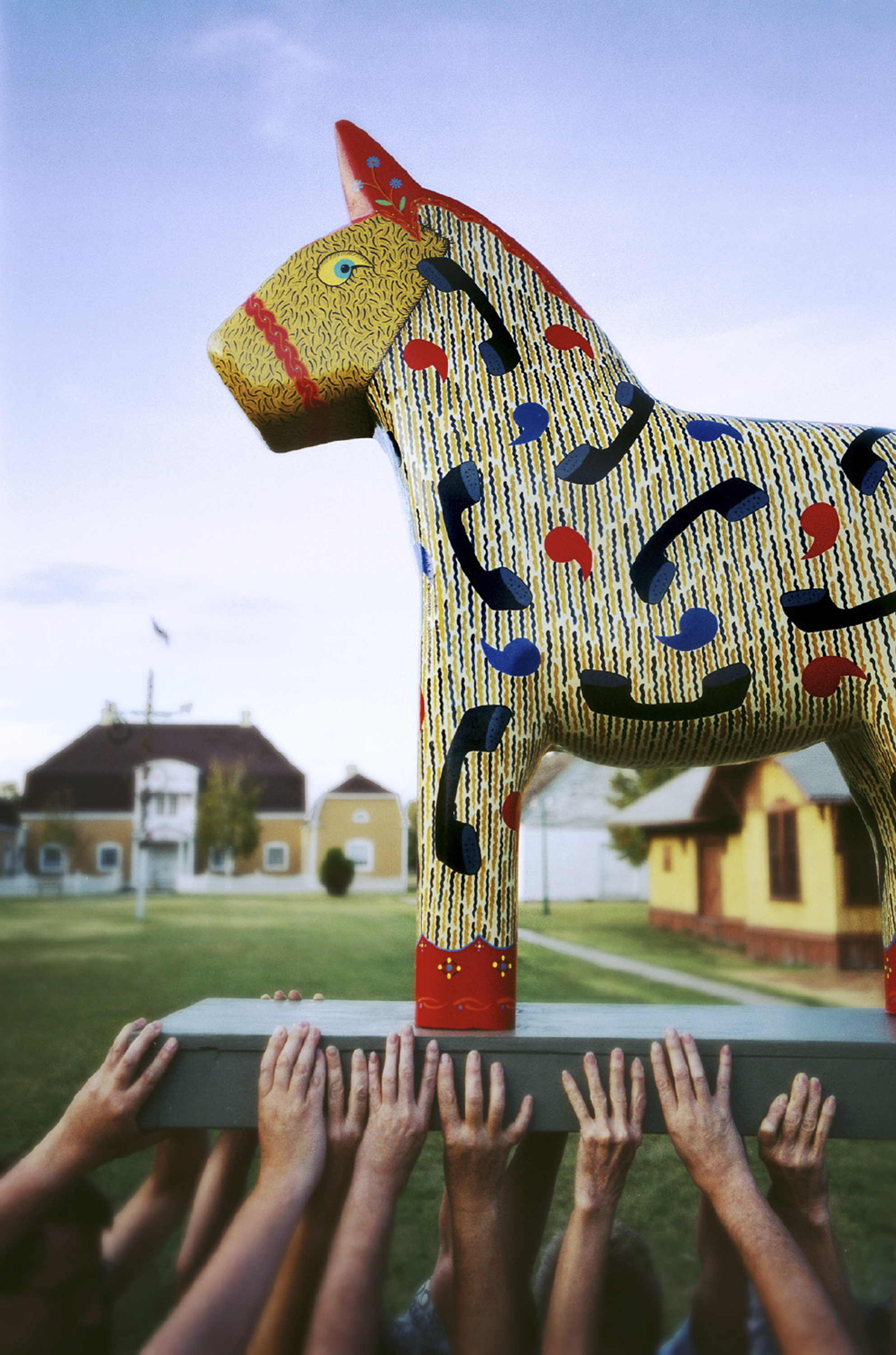
Dala horse from Lindsborg, Kansas

Today, Nusnäs is the centre of Dala horse production with the most famous being the Nils Olsson and Grannas Olsson workshops. Grannas A. Olssons Hemslöjd AB, founded in 1922, is the oldest company which still makes Dala horses. Nils Olssons Hemslöjd is almost as old. The horses made at these workshops share the same familiar pattern which most people associate to Dala horses. Apart from these, old-style horses are also hand-carved and painted in limited editions to replicate the style of the antique horses found in Swedish museums or held in private family collections. These are numbered and signed, so that they cannot be confused with an original early Dala horse.

The wood from which the figures are carved comes from the slow-growing pine forests around Lake Siljan. The wood is ideal for carpentry and carving. The trees to be made into horses are marked out while still standing in the forest. Only the best timber will be selected for carving into horses. The trees are felled and sawed into pieces of a suitable size for the blanks that will eventually be made into Dala horses.

The blanks are sawed and carved by hand. Because of this, no two horses are exactly alike. The horses are dipped in primer immediately after carving, to reveal any defects in the wood that may need to be fixed. After priming, any cavities in the wood are filled in to ensure extra smoothness. The horses are polished to give them a smooth, attractive finish.

After sanding, the horses are dipped into paint of the appropriate colour. The traditional pattern is painted free-hand by practised "ripple" painters. The art of rippling requires great skill and takes many years to learn. Finally, "all the fine horses" are varnished and sent out from Nusnäs to serve as a symbol of Sweden in the outside world.

In the United States, you can also view the production of Dala horses at the Hemslöjd, in Lindsborg, Kansas. This workshop is modelled after the hemslöjds you will find throughout Sweden's countryside.

=== Production of Dala horses ===
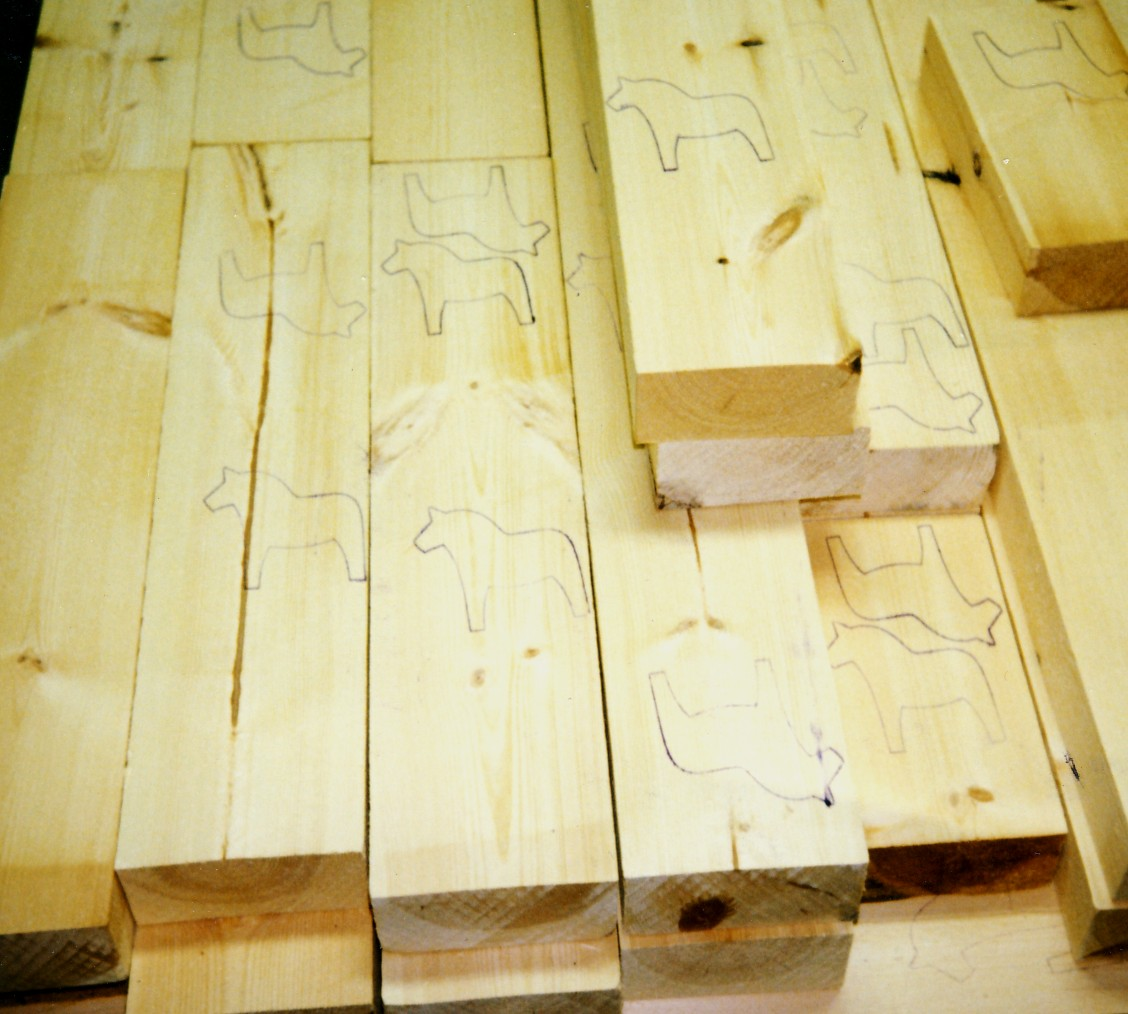

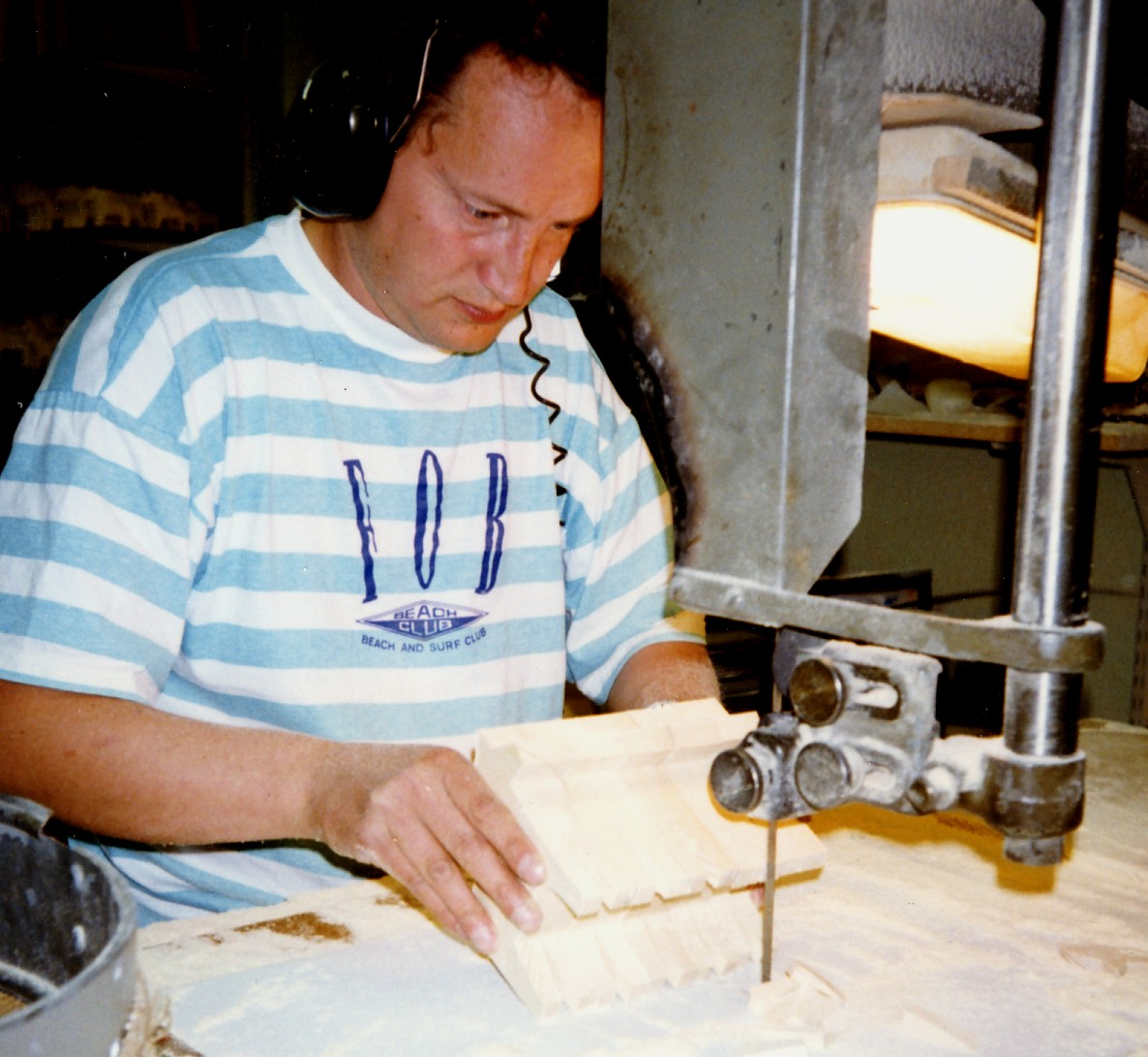
Bertil Grund in the "Grannas A. Olsson Hemslöjd" Factory

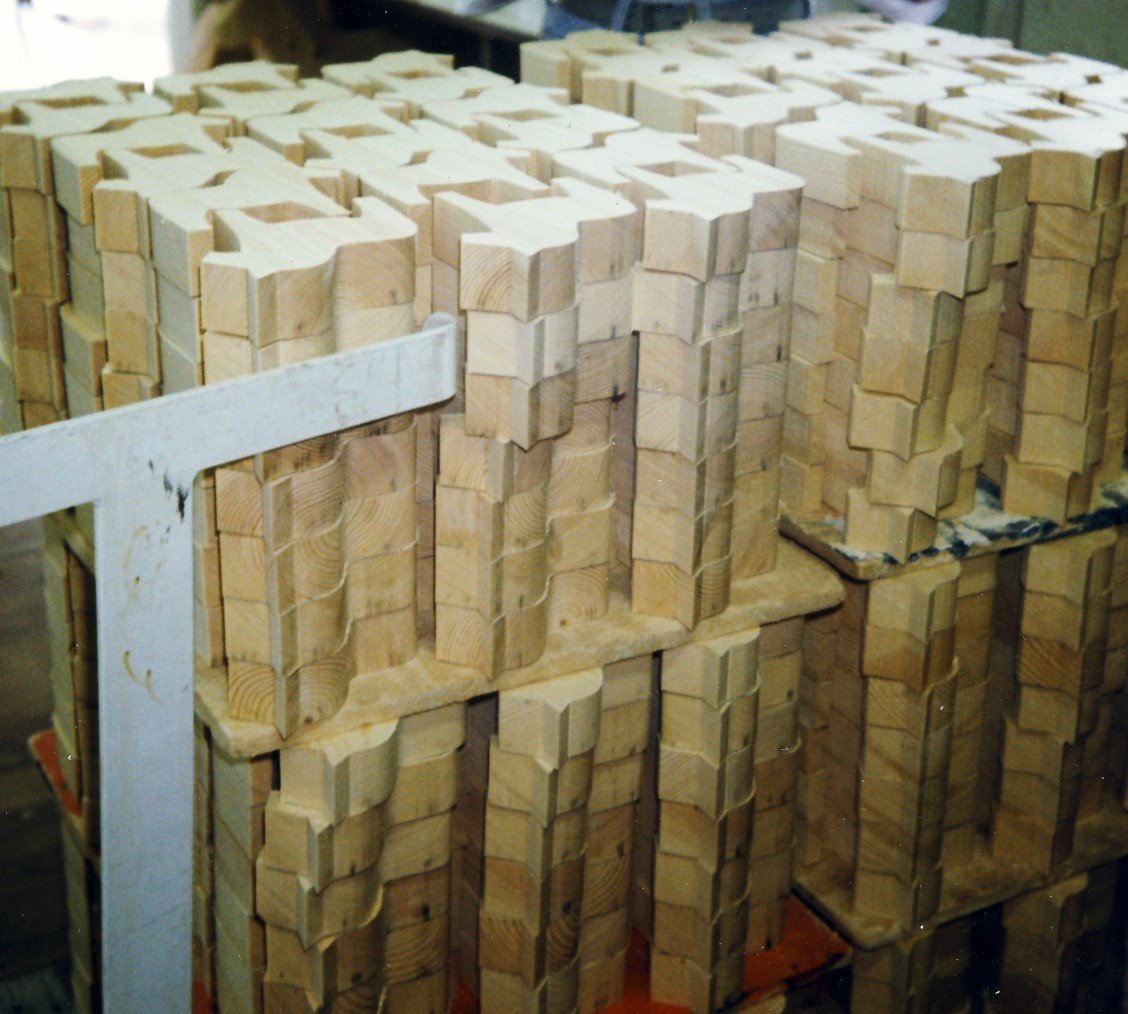

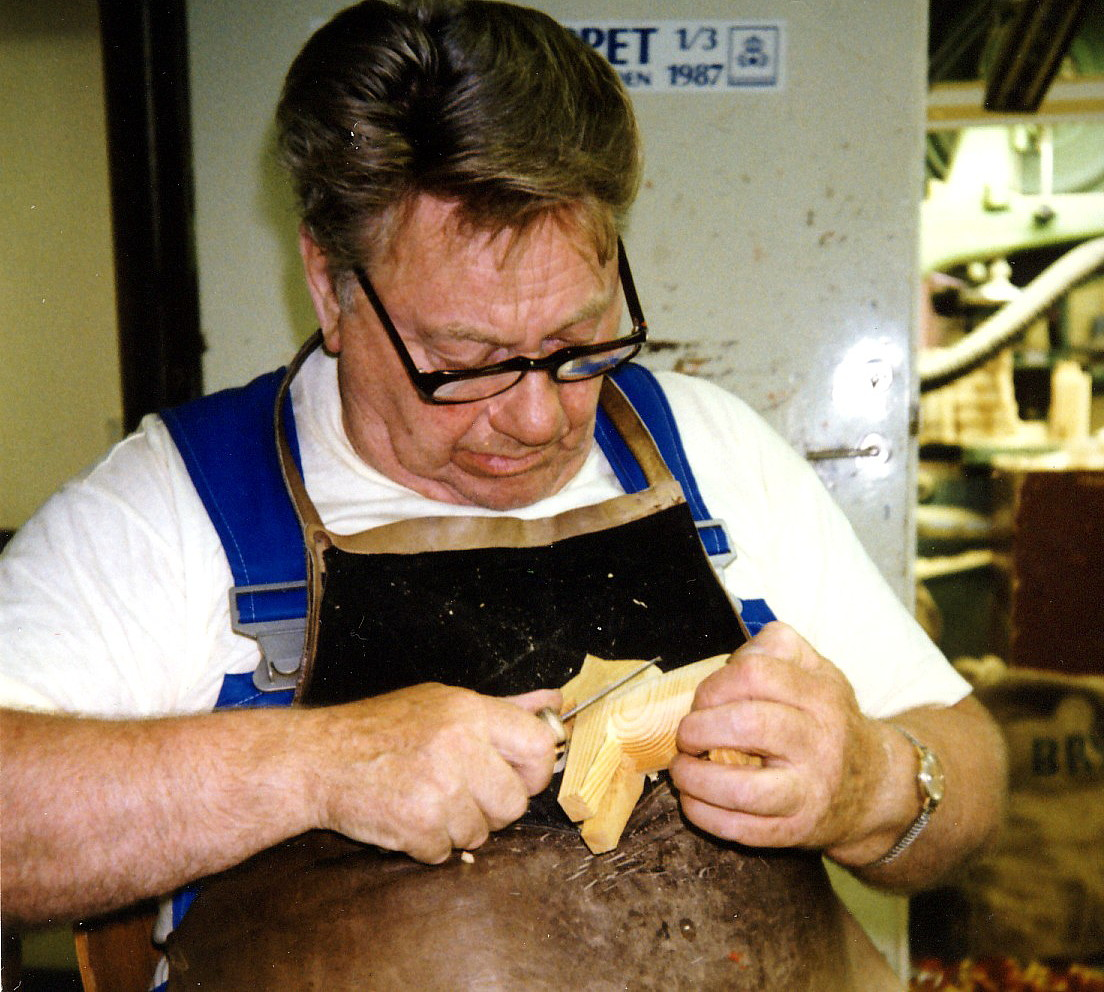

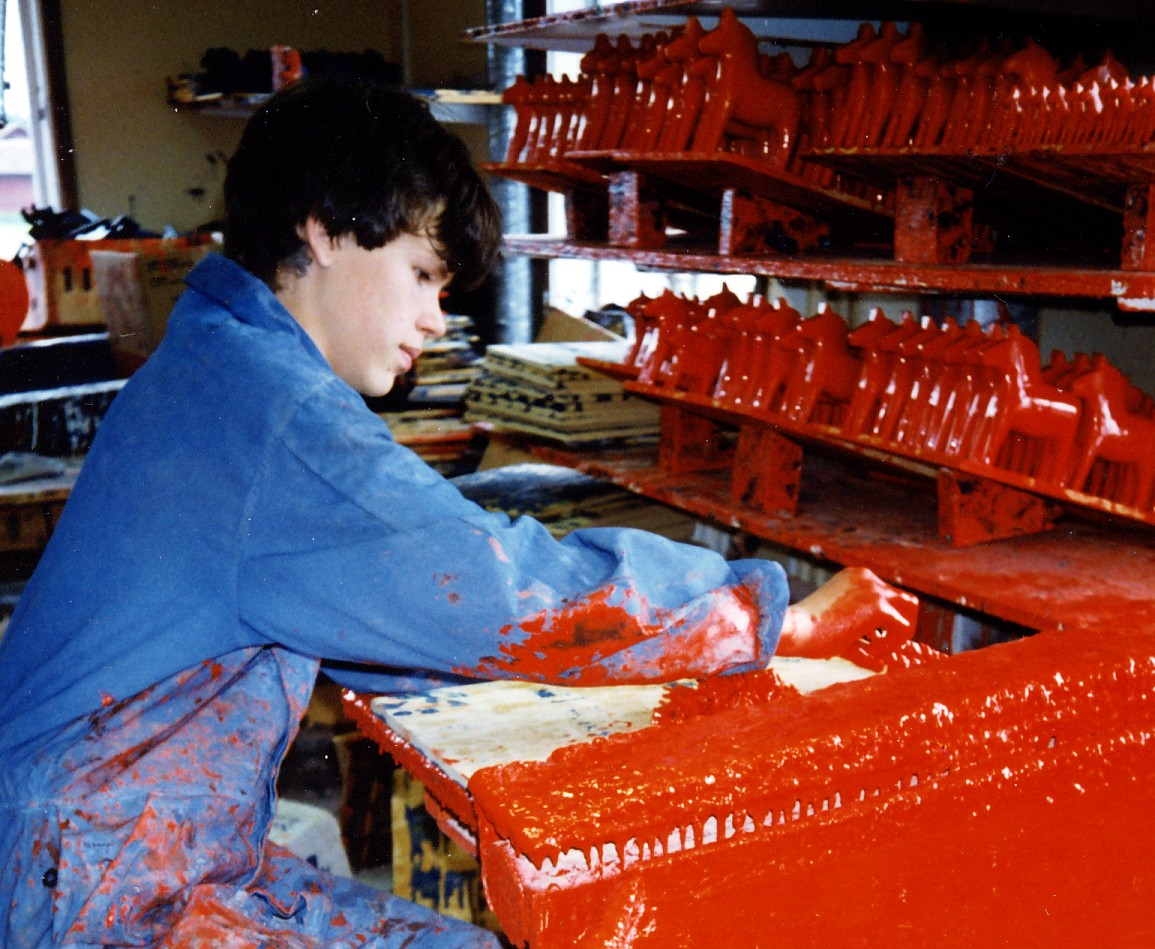

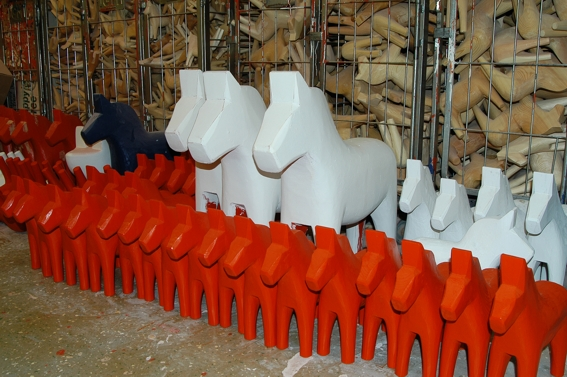

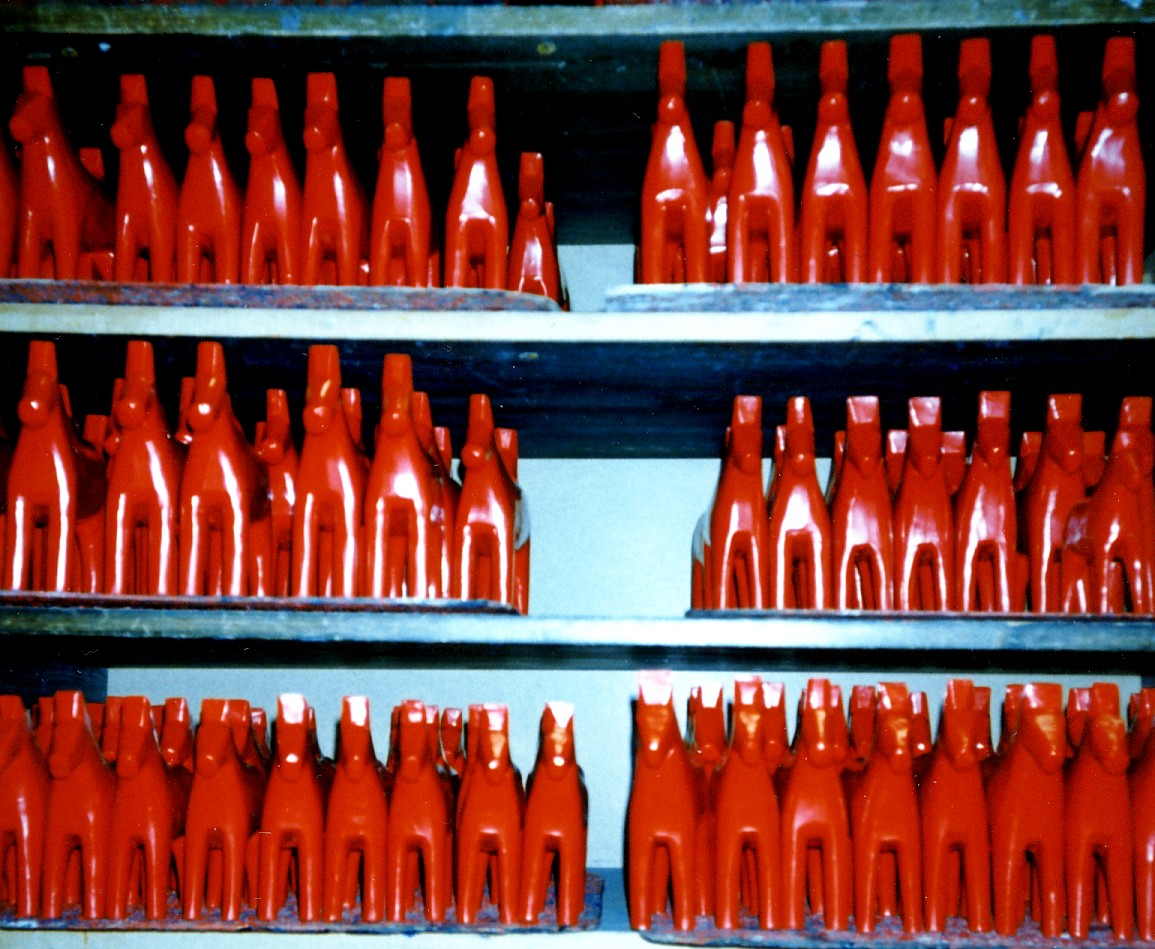

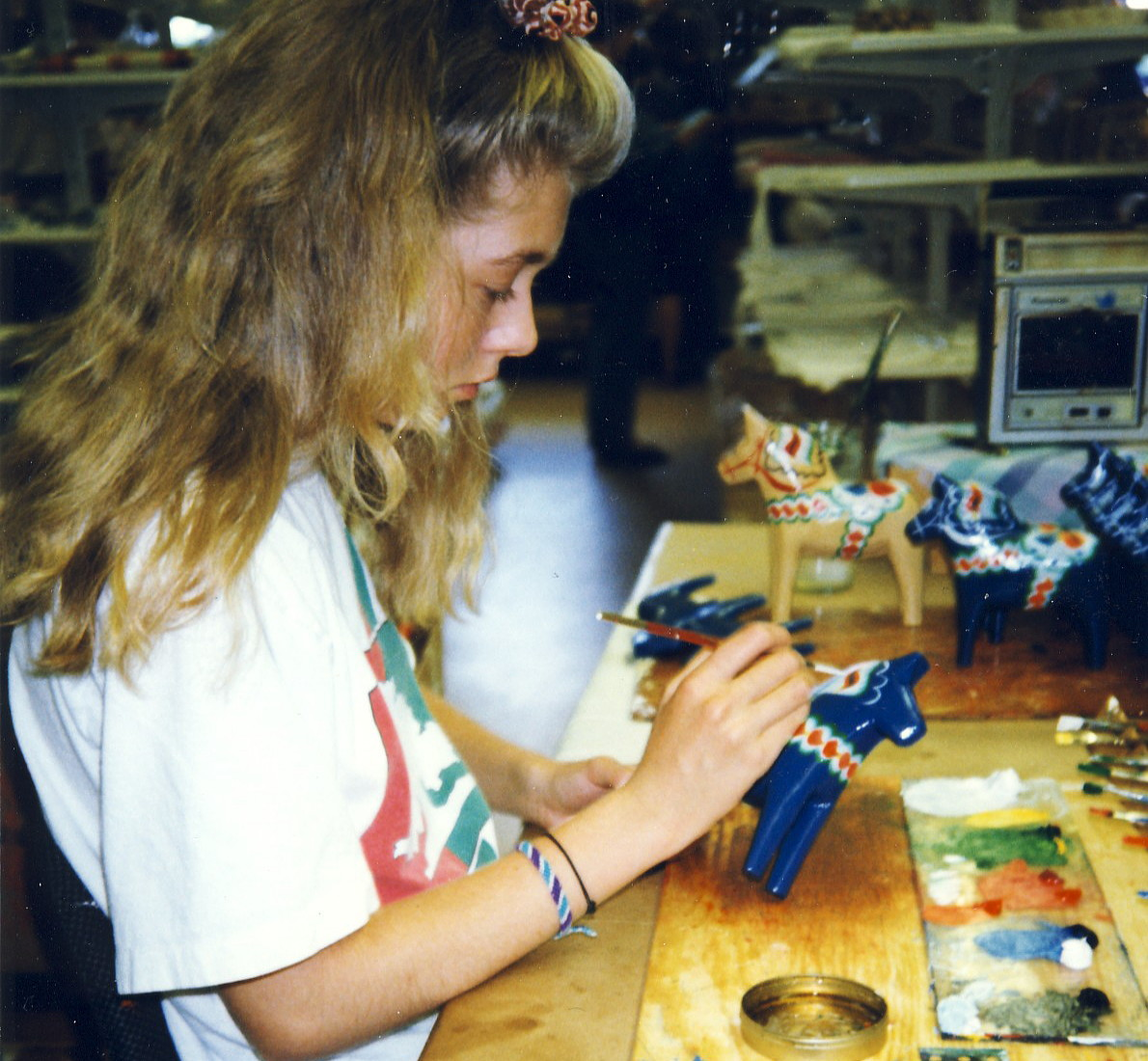

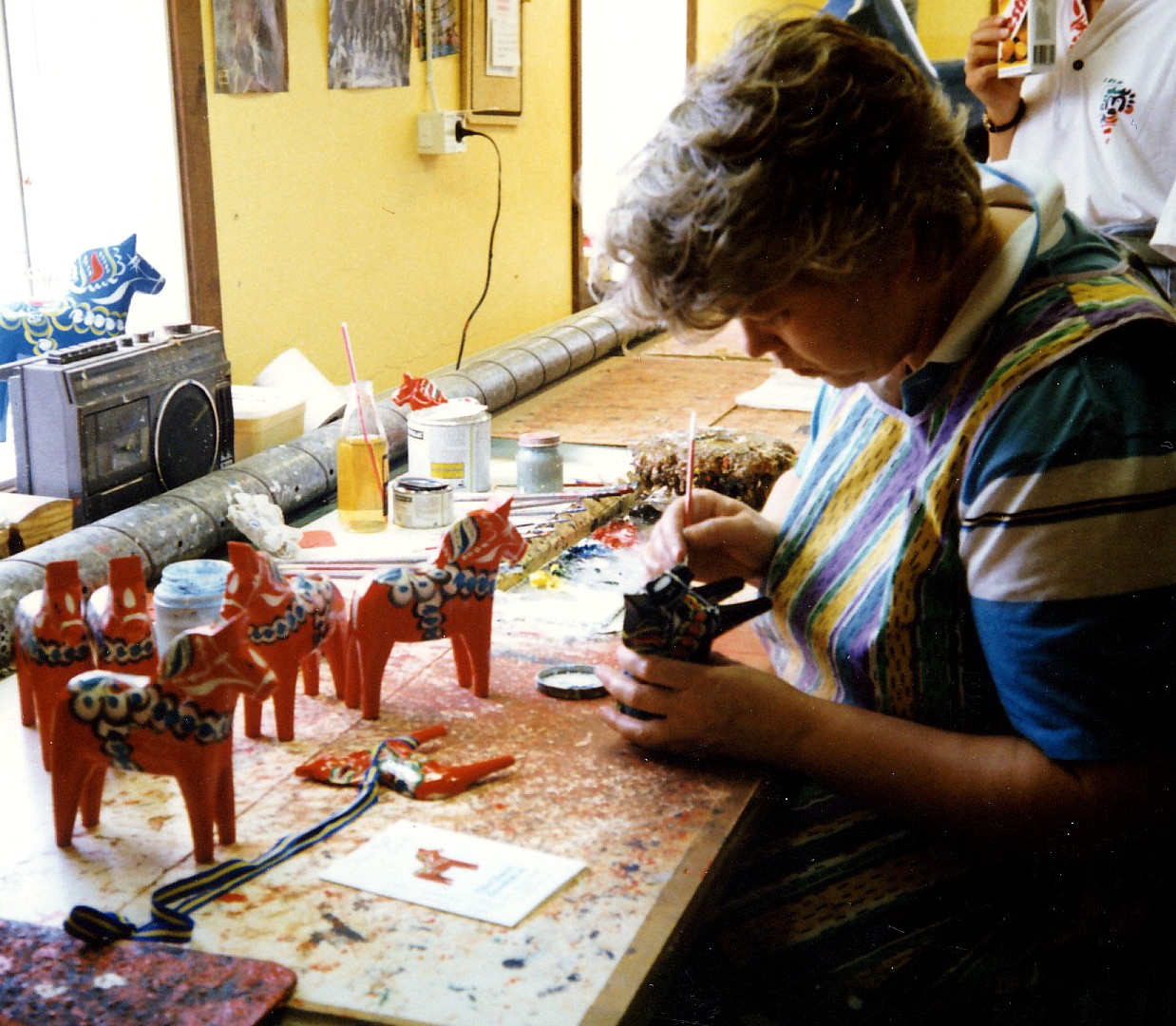

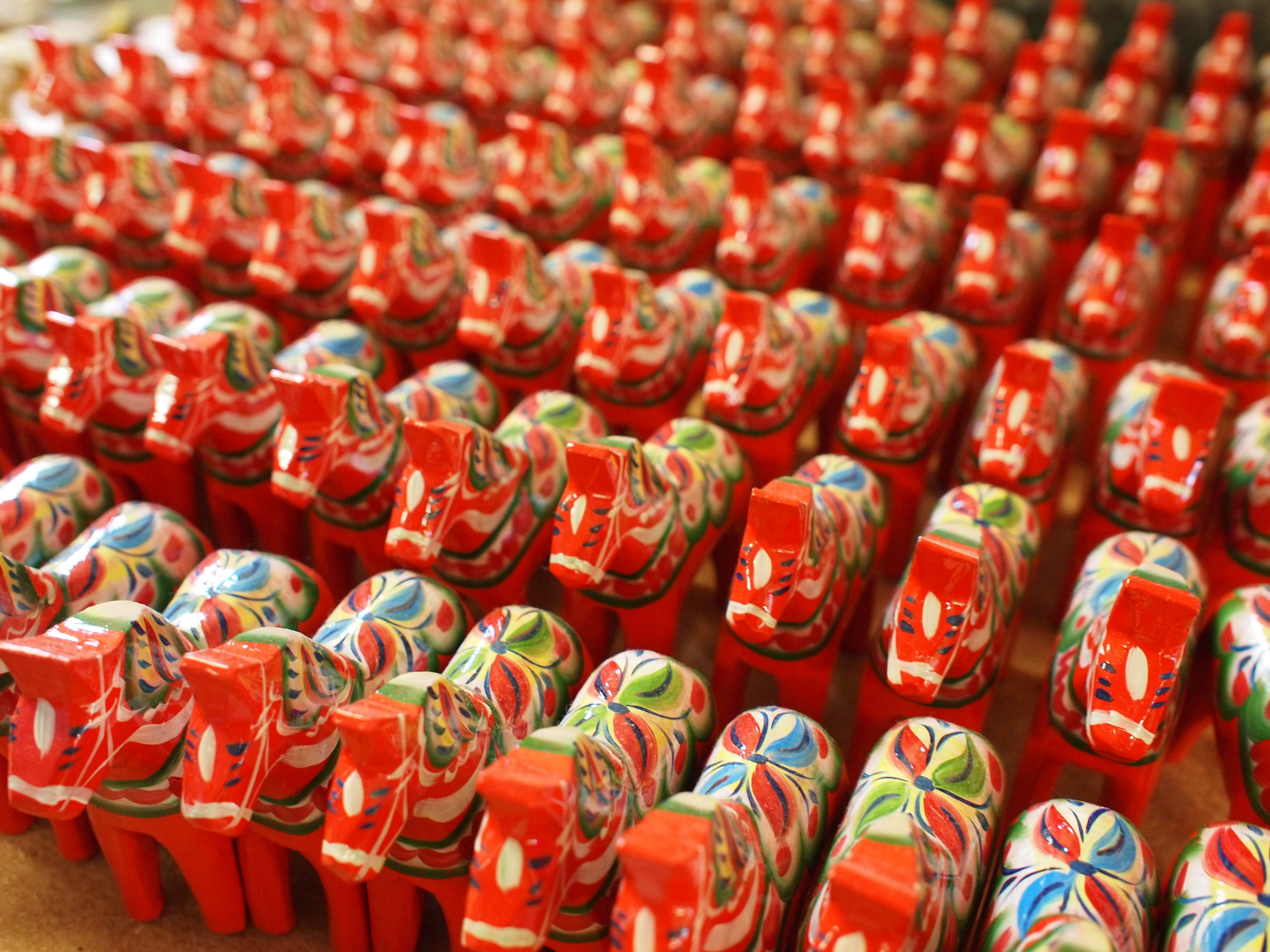

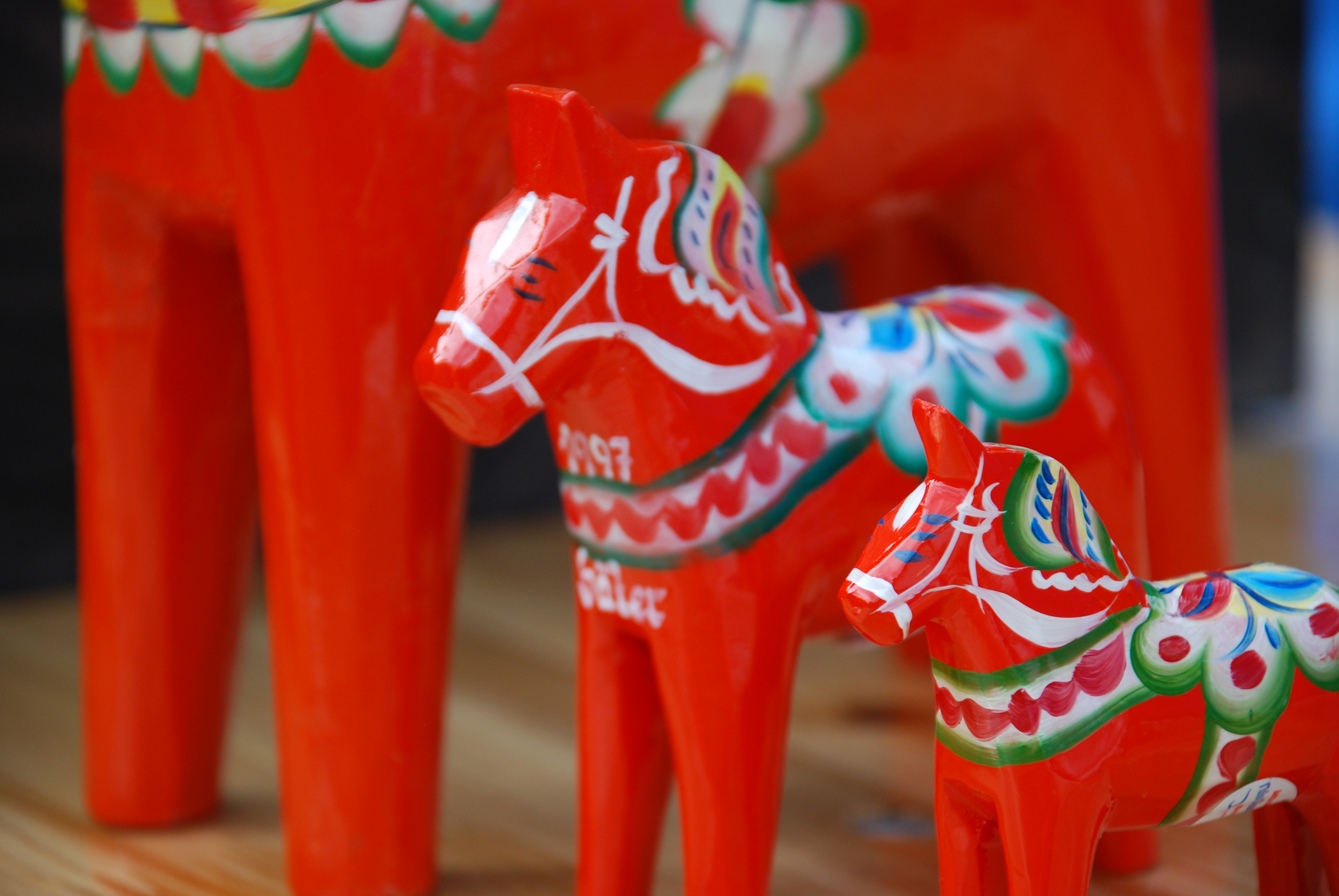

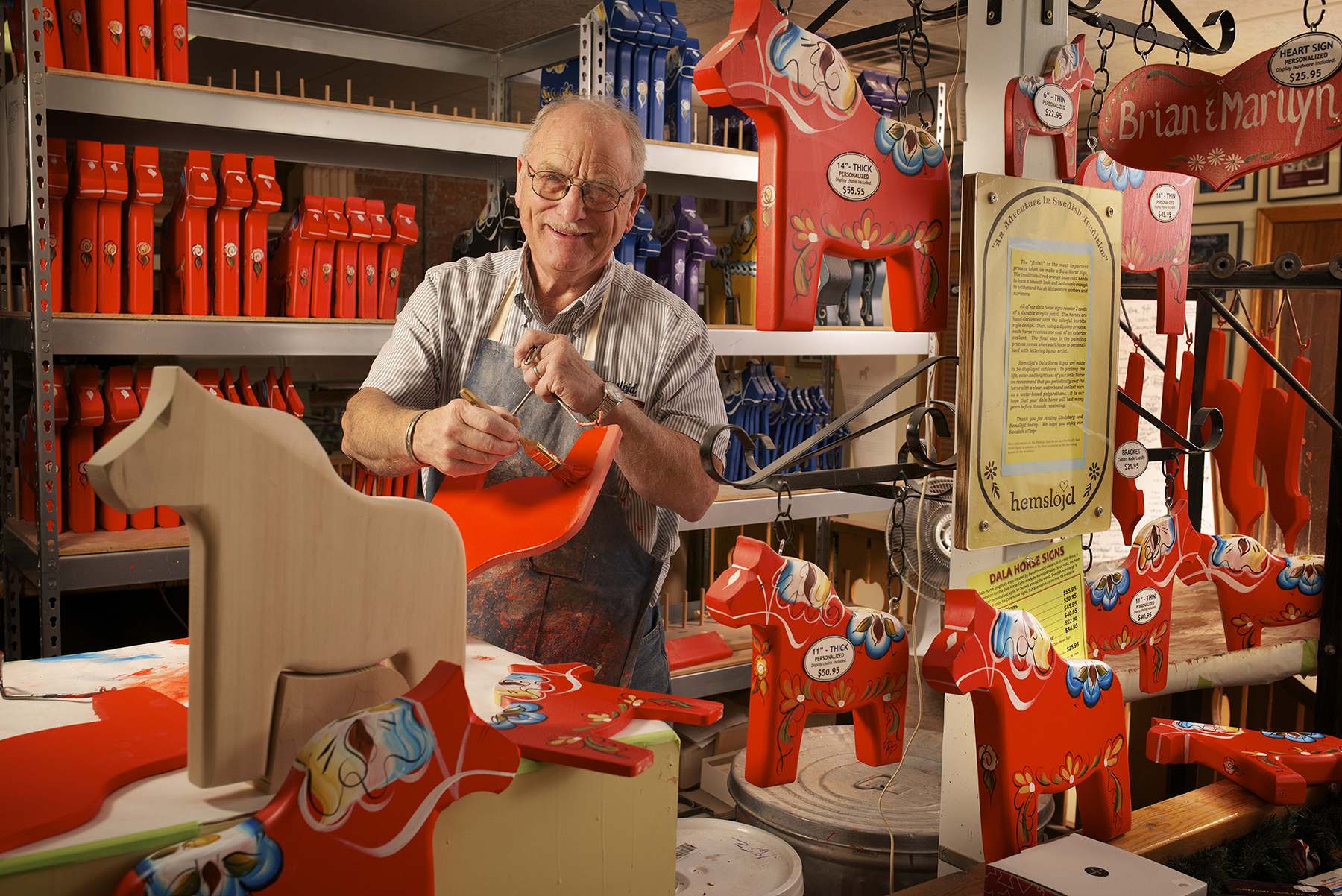
Workshop at the Hemslöjd in Lindsborg, Kansas

== Dala horses in the United States ==
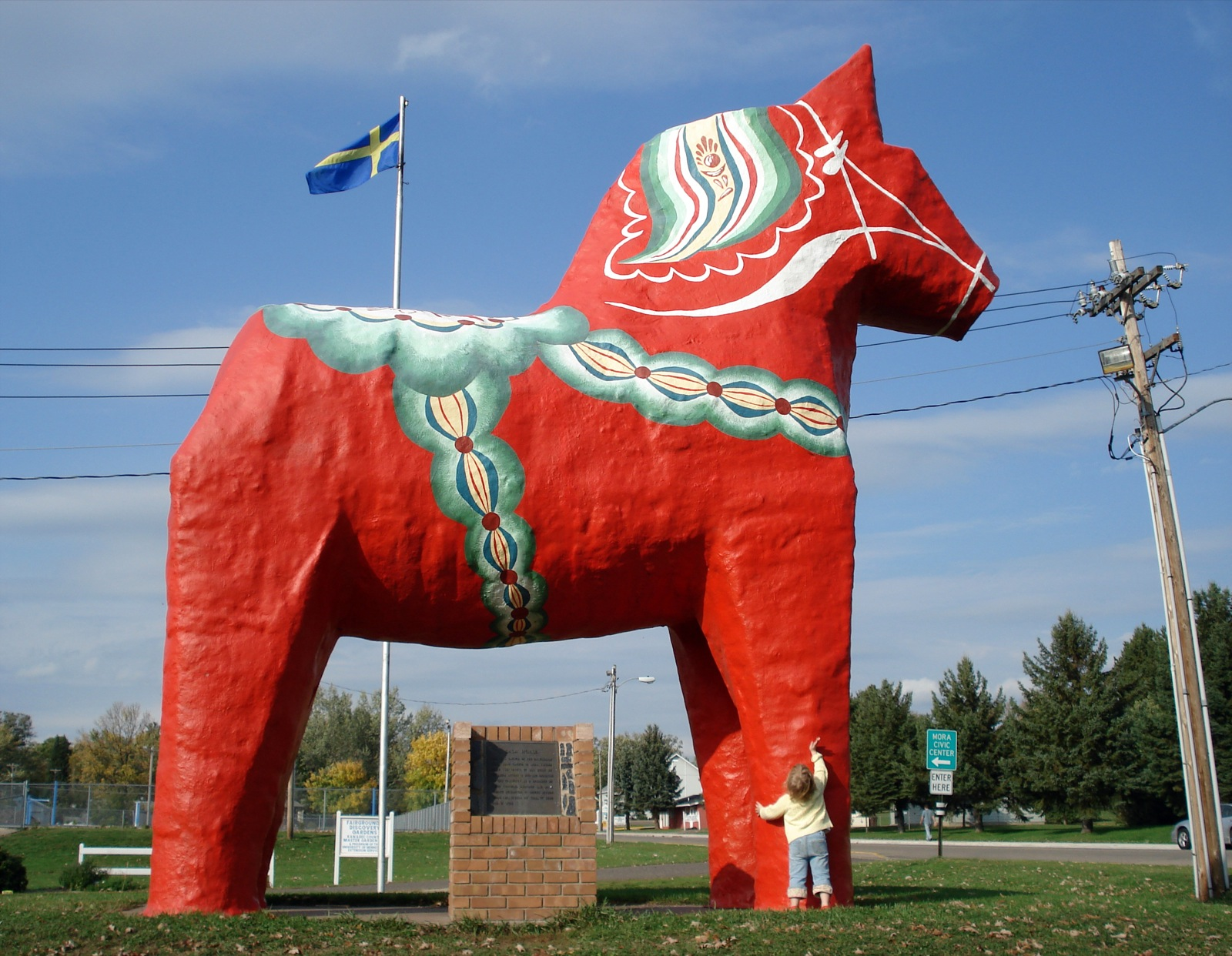
American replica in Mora, Minnesota

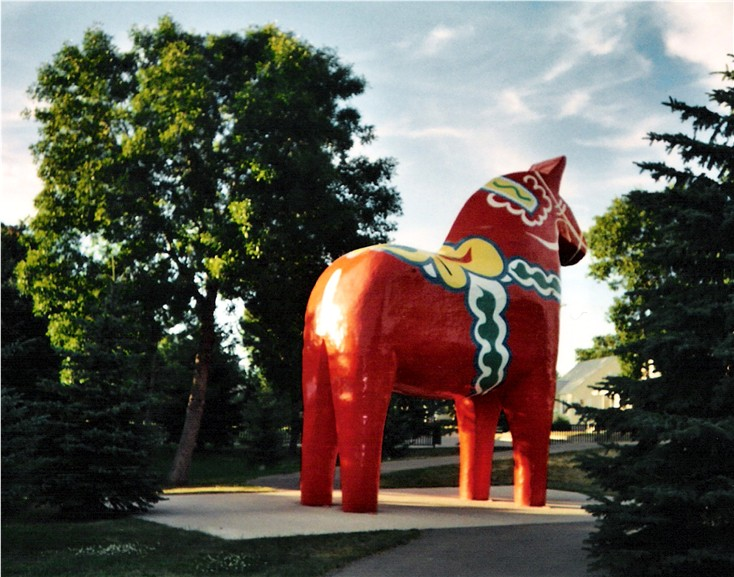
The Dala horse in Minot, North Dakota

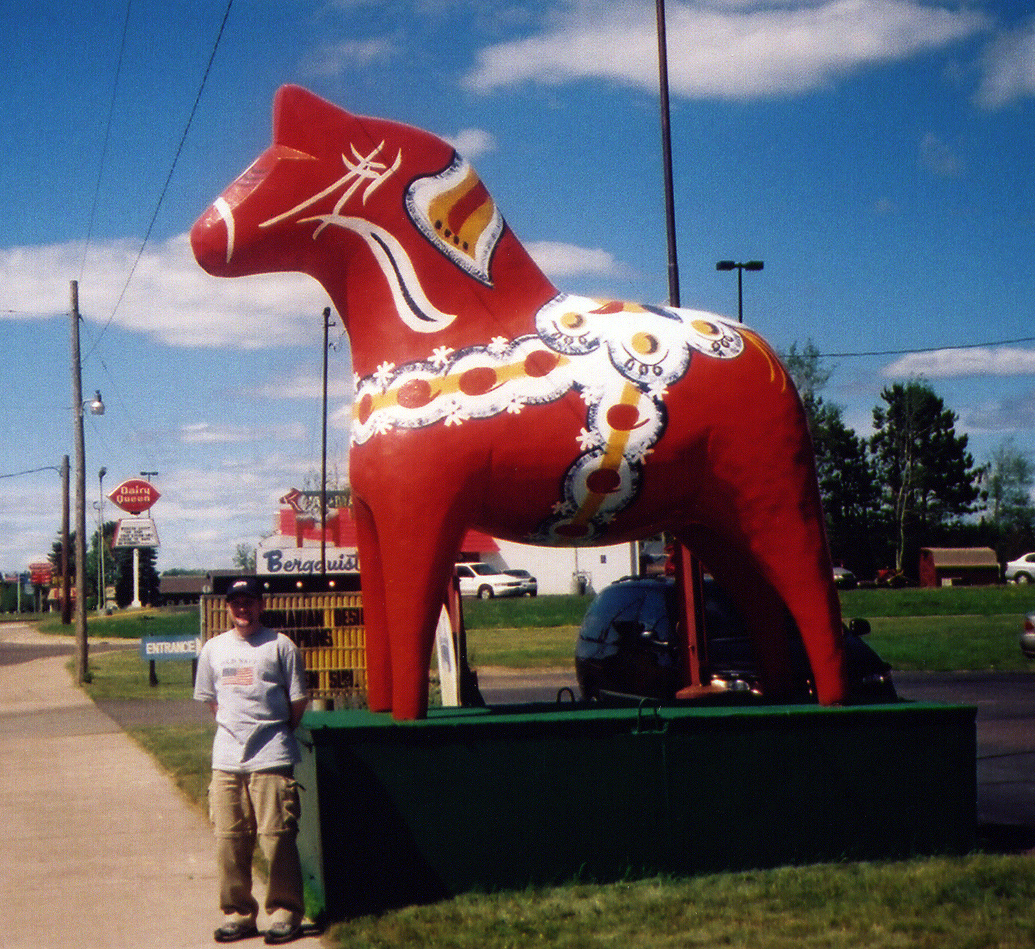
Dala horse in Cloquet, Minnesota

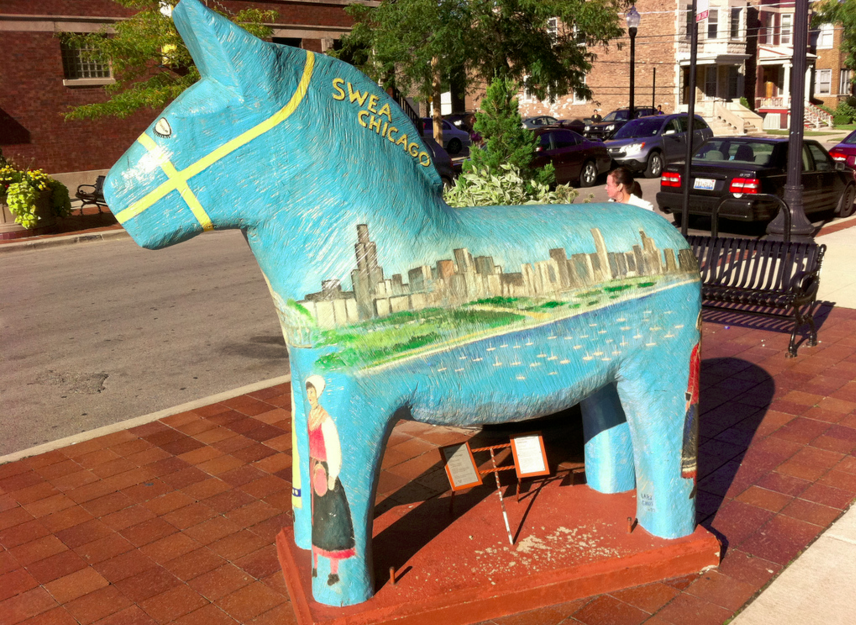
Dala horse in Andersonville, Chicago

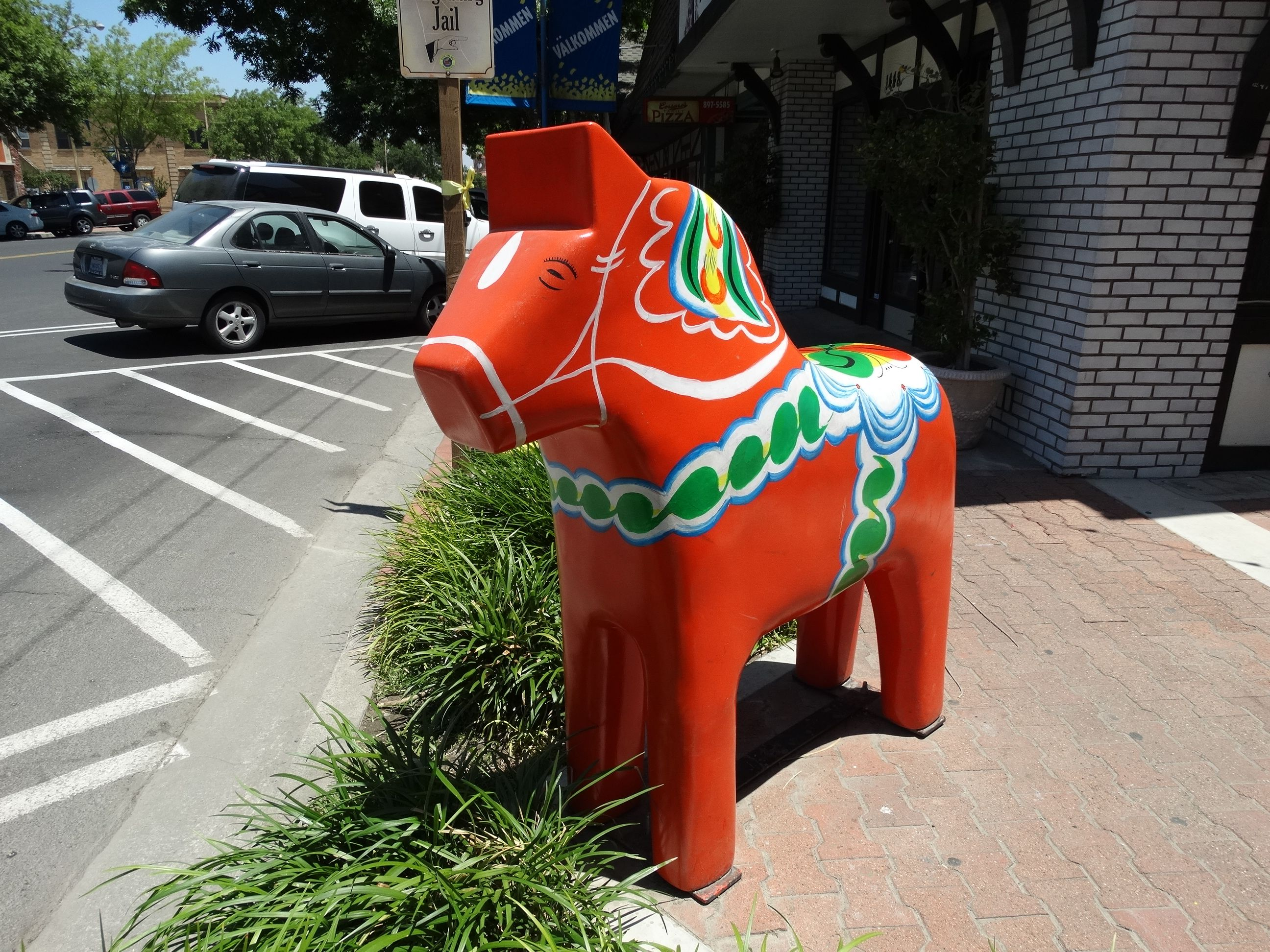
Dala Horse in Kingsburg, California

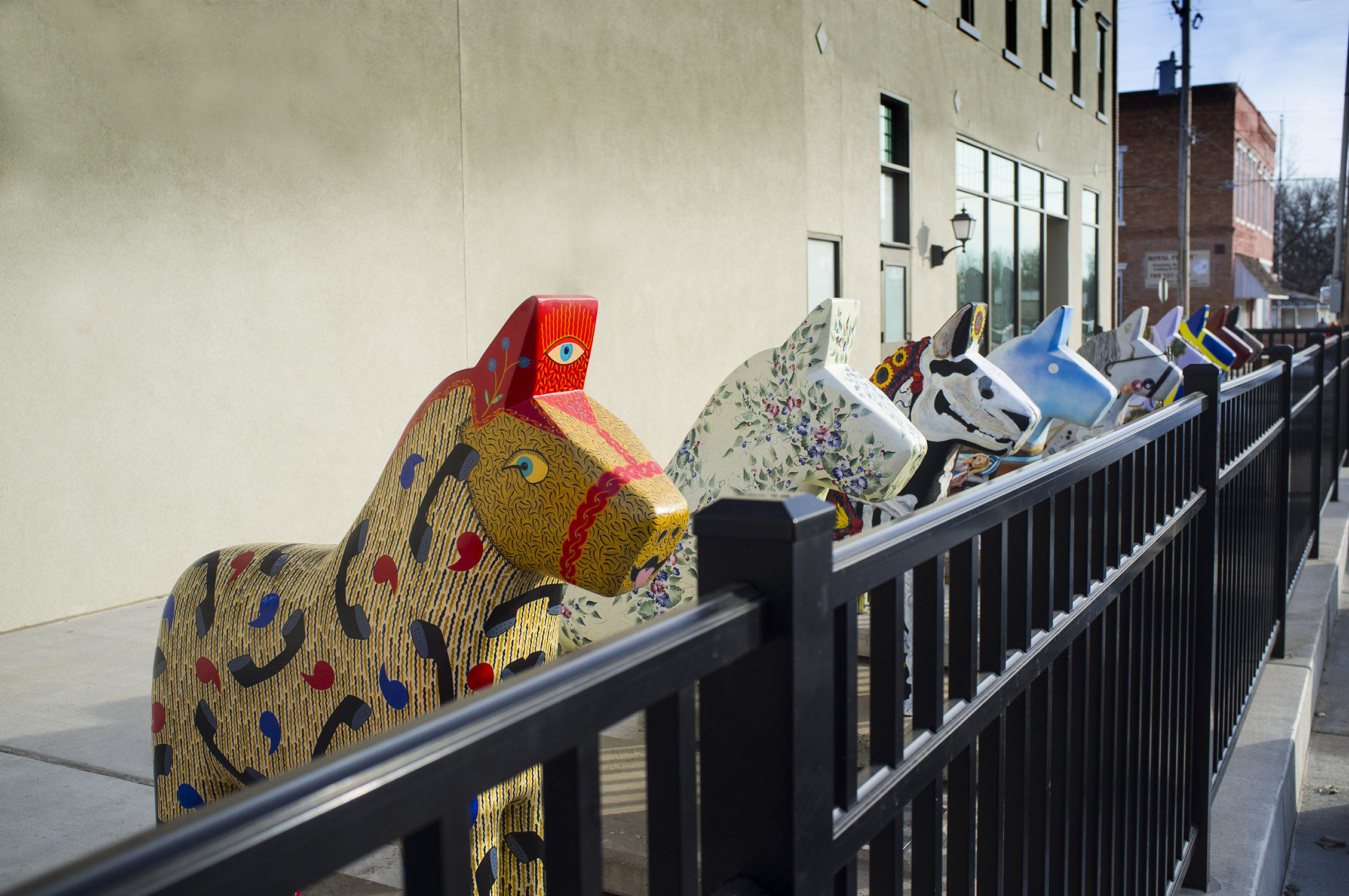
Dala horses in Lindsborg, Kansas

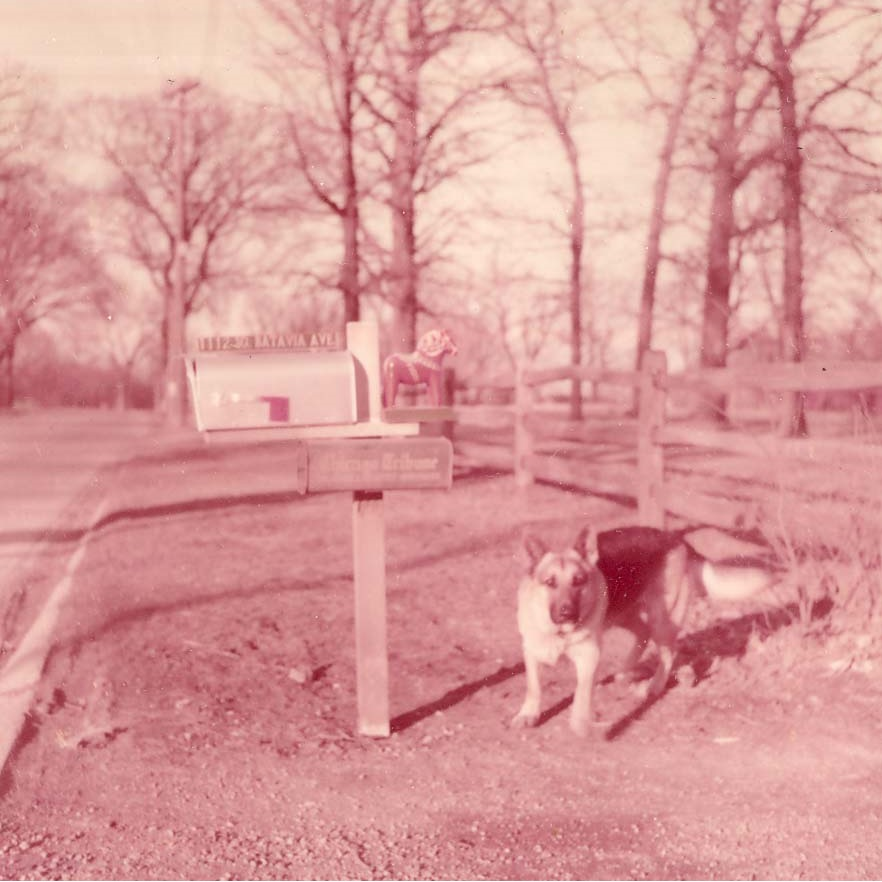
Birgit Ridderstedt's mail box in Batavia, Illinois, in 1958

Dala horses were introduced to North America at the 1939 World's Fair in New York. The architects Sven Markelius and Anders Beckman chose the Dala horse because they were searching for a powerful symbol for the Swedish pavilion at the fair.

A similar Dala horse can be seen in Andersonville, Chicago, donated by the Swedish American Women's Educational Association (SWEA) to the Swedish American Museum. SWEA commissioned the Swedish Artist Lars Gillis to paint the Dala horse in a way that represents the connection between Sweden and Chicago. After eight years, the original Dala horse could not withstand the harsh Chicago weather conditions and was removed in 2013 for restoration that took a year. It is now kept in the lobby of the Swedish American Museum, which provided a fiberglass replica placed on the corner of Clark and Farragut streets.
