= Färnäs =

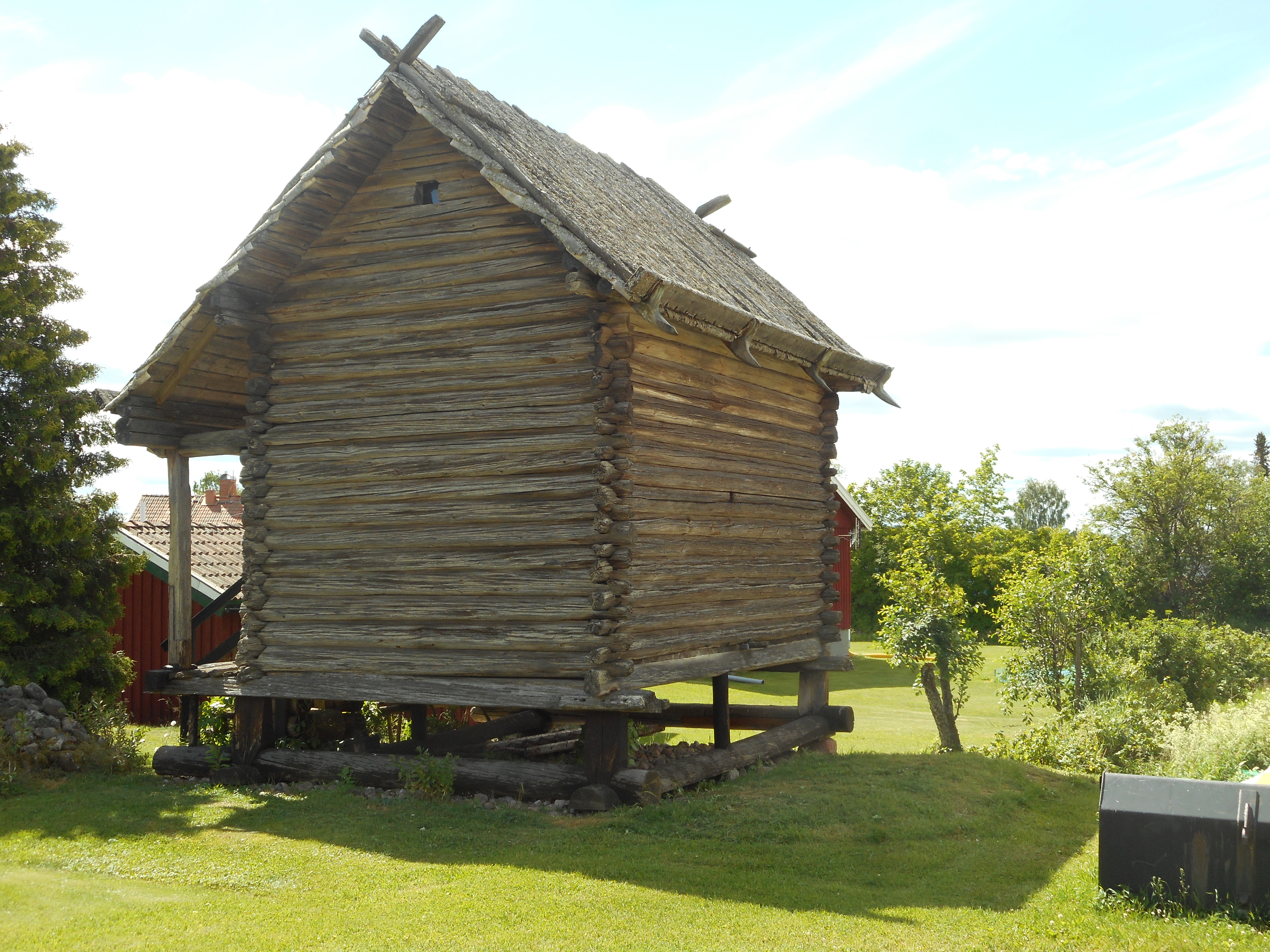
- The Färnäs granary building

- Location within Dalarna Location within Sweden
- Coordinates: 61°00′02″N 14°37′36″E
- Country: Sweden
- Province: Dalarna
- County: Dalarna County
- Municipality: Mora Municipality

Area
  - Total: 1.54 km^{2} (0.59 sq mi)

Population (31 December 2010)
  - Total: 988
  - Density: 642/km^{2} (1,660/sq mi)
- Time zone: UTC+1 (CET)
  - Summer (DST): UTC+2 (CEST)

Färnäs is a locality situated in Mora Municipality, Dalarna County, Sweden with 988 inhabitants in 2010.
