= Mora Municipality, Sweden =

Mora Municipality Mora kommun
- Municipality
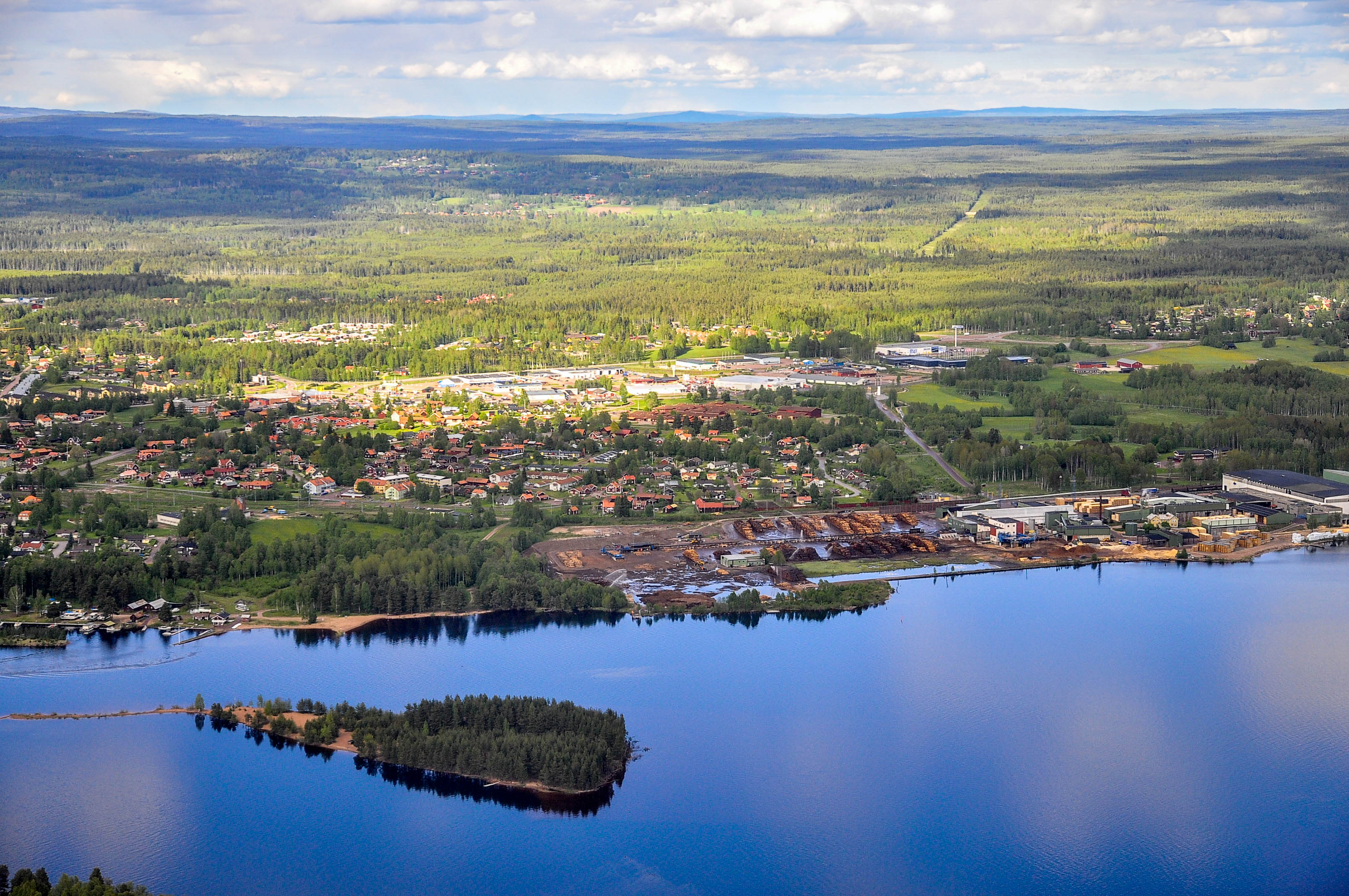

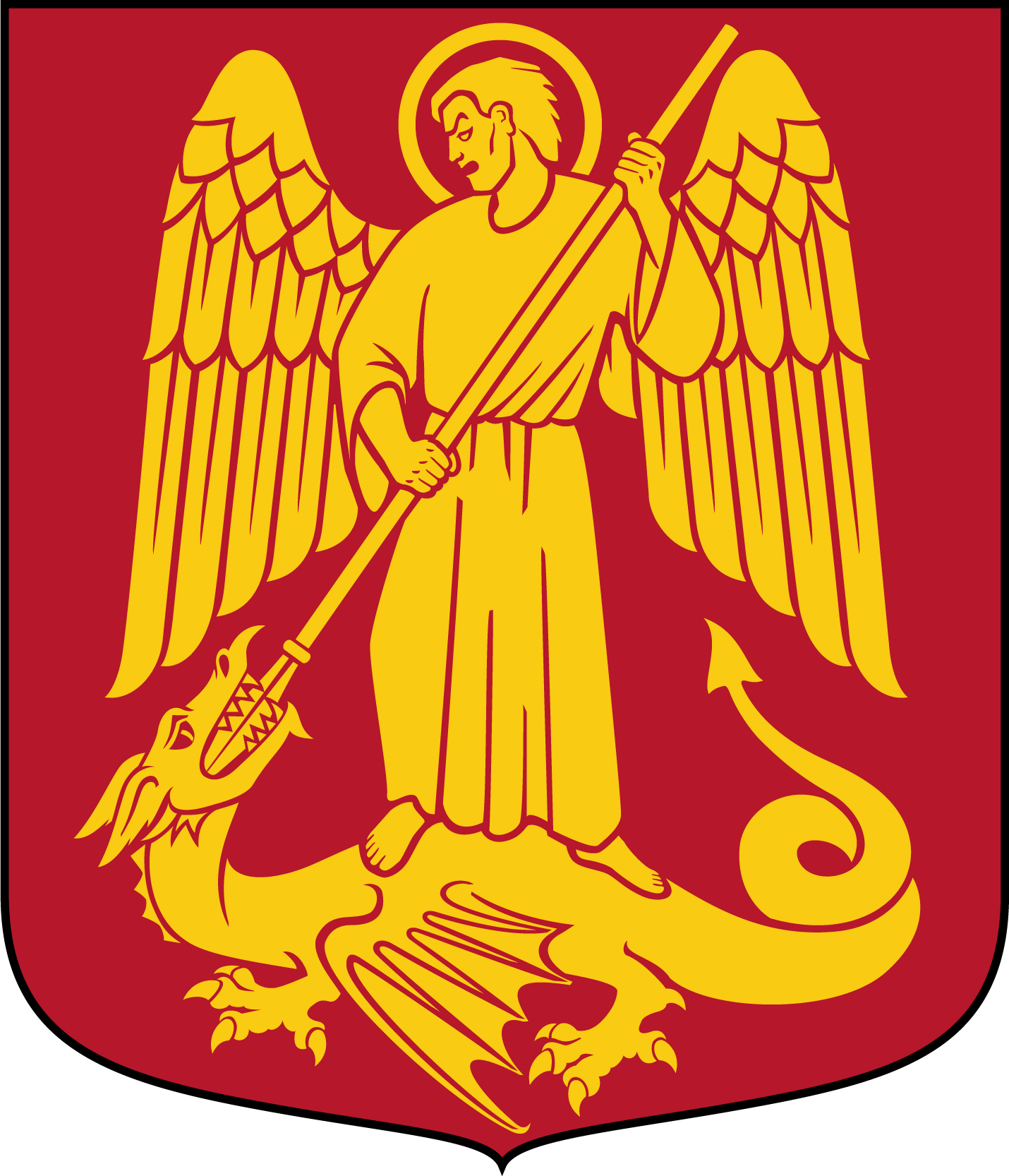
- Coat of arms

- Coordinates: 61°01′N 14°32′E
- Country: Sweden
- County: Dalarna County
- Seat: Mora

Area
  - Total: 3,111.54 km^{2} (1,201.37 sq mi)
  - Land: 2,812.56 km^{2} (1,085.94 sq mi)
  - Water: 298.98 km^{2} (115.44 sq mi)
- Area as of 1 January 2014.

Population (30 June 2025)
  - Total: 20,512
  - Density: 7.2930/km^{2} (18.889/sq mi)
- Time zone: UTC+1 (CET)
  - Summer (DST): UTC+2 (CEST)
- ISO 3166 code: SE
- Province: Dalarna
- Municipal code: 2062
- Website: www.mora.se
- Density is calculated using land area only.

Mora Municipality (Swedish: Mora kommun) is a municipality in Dalarna County in central Sweden. Its seat is located in the town of Mora.

The present municipality was created in 1971, when four older municipal entities were amalgamated.

== Localities ==
- Bergkarlås
- Bonäs
- Färnäs
- Gesunda
- Gopshus
- Mora (seat)
- Nusnäs
- Selja
- Sollerön
- Vattnäs
- Venjan
- Vinäs
- Våmhus
- Östnor
- Öna

== Demographics ==
This is a demographic table based on Mora Municipality's electoral districts in the 2022 Swedish general election sourced from SVT's election platform, in turn taken from SCB official statistics.

In total there were 16,295 Swedish citizens of voting age resident in the municipality. 44.3 % voted for the left coalition and 54.3 % for the right coalition. Indicators are in percentage points except population totals and income.

| Location | Residents | Citizen adults | Left vote | Right vote | Employed | Swedish parents | Foreign heritage | Income SEK | Degree |
| Location | | | % | % | | | | | |
|---|---|---|---|---|---|---|---|---|---|
| Färnäs-Nusnäs-Garsås | 2,047 | 1,677 | 38.6 | 60.1 | 86 | 94 | 6 | 25,398 | 30 |
| Klockarhagen | 1,724 | 1,327 | 44.3 | 54.2 | 79 | 79 | 21 | 22,869 | 33 |
| Morkarlby | 1,925 | 1,482 | 47.8 | 50.6 | 84 | 91 | 9 | 27,683 | 47 |
| Noret N-Bergkarlås | 1,872 | 1,369 | 43.8 | 55.0 | 77 | 83 | 17 | 23,989 | 32 |
| Noret S | 1,818 | 1,384 | 49.5 | 49.0 | 80 | 85 | 15 | 25,051 | 43 |
| Sollerö-Isunda | 1,760 | 1,381 | 48.0 | 51.3 | 83 | 93 | 7 | 24,556 | 39 |
| Stranden | 1,784 | 1,451 | 50.3 | 47.5 | 79 | 83 | 17 | 23,927 | 38 |
| Utmeland-Hånåkni | 1,478 | 1,185 | 47.1 | 51.6 | 82 | 91 | 9 | 25,584 | 36 |
| Vika-Venjan-Selbäck | 1,269 | 1,032 | 40.0 | 59.0 | 83 | 90 | 10 | 23,425 | 29 |
| Våmhus-Bonäs | 1,702 | 1,363 | 37.9 | 61.0 | 84 | 96 | 4 | 24,870 | 28 |
| Öna-Kråkberg | 1,879 | 1,510 | 41.8 | 57.2 | 86 | 93 | 7 | 26,872 | 37 |
| Östnor-Hemus | 1,399 | 1,134 | 40.7 | 58.1 | 85 | 95 | 5 | 27,091 | 36 |
Source: SVT

== Riksdag elections ==
| Year | % | Votes | V | S | MP | C | L | KD | M | SD | NyD | Left | Right |
|---|---|---|---|---|---|---|---|---|---|---|---|---|---|
| 1973 | 88.6 | 11,327 | 3.5 | 37.3 | | 41.2 | 6.6 | 1.2 | 10.0 | | | 40.8 | 57.7 |
| 1976 | 89.5 | 12,209 | 2.7 | 36.6 | | 41.2 | 7.0 | 1.0 | 11.0 | | | 39.2 | 59.2 |
| 1979 | 87.8 | 12,439 | 3.8 | 39.5 | | 33.9 | 6.3 | 1.1 | 15.1 | | | 43.2 | 55.3 |
| 1982 | 89.1 | 12,962 | 3.5 | 41.5 | 1.8 | 28.5 | 3.7 | 1.5 | 19.4 | | | 45.1 | 51.6 |
| 1985 | 86.2 | 12,905 | 3.6 | 41.4 | 1.7 | 22.2 | 12.9 | | 18.0 | | | 45.0 | 53.1 |
| 1988 | 80.1 | 12,097 | 5.0 | 40.0 | 6.3 | 20.4 | 11.4 | 2.8 | 14.0 | | | 51.3 | 45.8 |
| 1991 | 81.1 | 12,492 | 3.4 | 34.3 | 3.9 | 14.8 | 7.4 | 6.7 | 18.2 | | 10.3 | 37.6 | 47.1 |
| 1994 | 81.5 | 12,704 | 5.8 | 44.7 | 7.5 | 11.2 | 6.4 | 4.3 | 18.4 | | 1.0 | 58.0 | 40.3 |
| 1998 | 77.8 | 12,050 | 13.3 | 35.0 | 6.0 | 6.6 | 4.0 | 14.0 | 18.3 | | | 54.2 | 42.9 |
| 2002 | 76.1 | 11,660 | 8.2 | 39.0 | 5.2 | 12.2 | 11.0 | 8.6 | 12.2 | 1.0 | | 52.4 | 43.9 |
| 2006 | 77.7 | 12,053 | 5.2 | 36.3 | 4.8 | 13.6 | 4.9 | 4.8 | 23.3 | 1.8 | | 46.2 | 46.6 |
| 2010 | 81.5 | 12,930 | 4.6 | 36.1 | 6.0 | 9.0 | 4.9 | 4.5 | 26.8 | 6.1 | | 46.7 | 45.3 |
| 2014 | 84.5 | 13,457 | 4.5 | 35.5 | 4.6 | 9.9 | 2.9 | 3.1 | 19.5 | 16.9 | | 44.6 | 35.4 |
| 2018 | 86.6 | 13,748 | 6.1 | 29.2 | 2.9 | 11.8 | 3.4 | 6.8 | 15.7 | 22.5 | | 50.0 | 48.4 |
| 2022 | 85.3 | 13,751 | 4.3 | 29.6 | 3.3 | 7.1 | 2.9 | 6.5 | 16.0 | 29.0 | | 44.3 | 54.3 |

== Twin towns – sister cities ==
Mora terminated all its twinnings.

== See also ==
- Zorn Collections
- Mora, Minnesota
- Mora County, New Mexico
- Mora clock
- Mora knife
