= Selja, Sweden =

Selja
- Location within Dalarna Location within Sweden
- Coordinates: 61°00′58″N 14°28′37″E
- Country: Sweden
- Province: Dalarna
- County: Dalarna County
- Municipality: Mora Municipality

Area
  - Total: 1.15 km^{2} (0.44 sq mi)

Population (31 December 2010)
  - Total: 548
  - Density: 478/km^{2} (1,240/sq mi)
- Time zone: UTC+1 (CET)
  - Summer (DST): UTC+2 (CEST)

Selja is a locality situated in Mora Municipality, Dalarna County, Sweden with 548 inhabitants in 2010.
