= Gesunda =

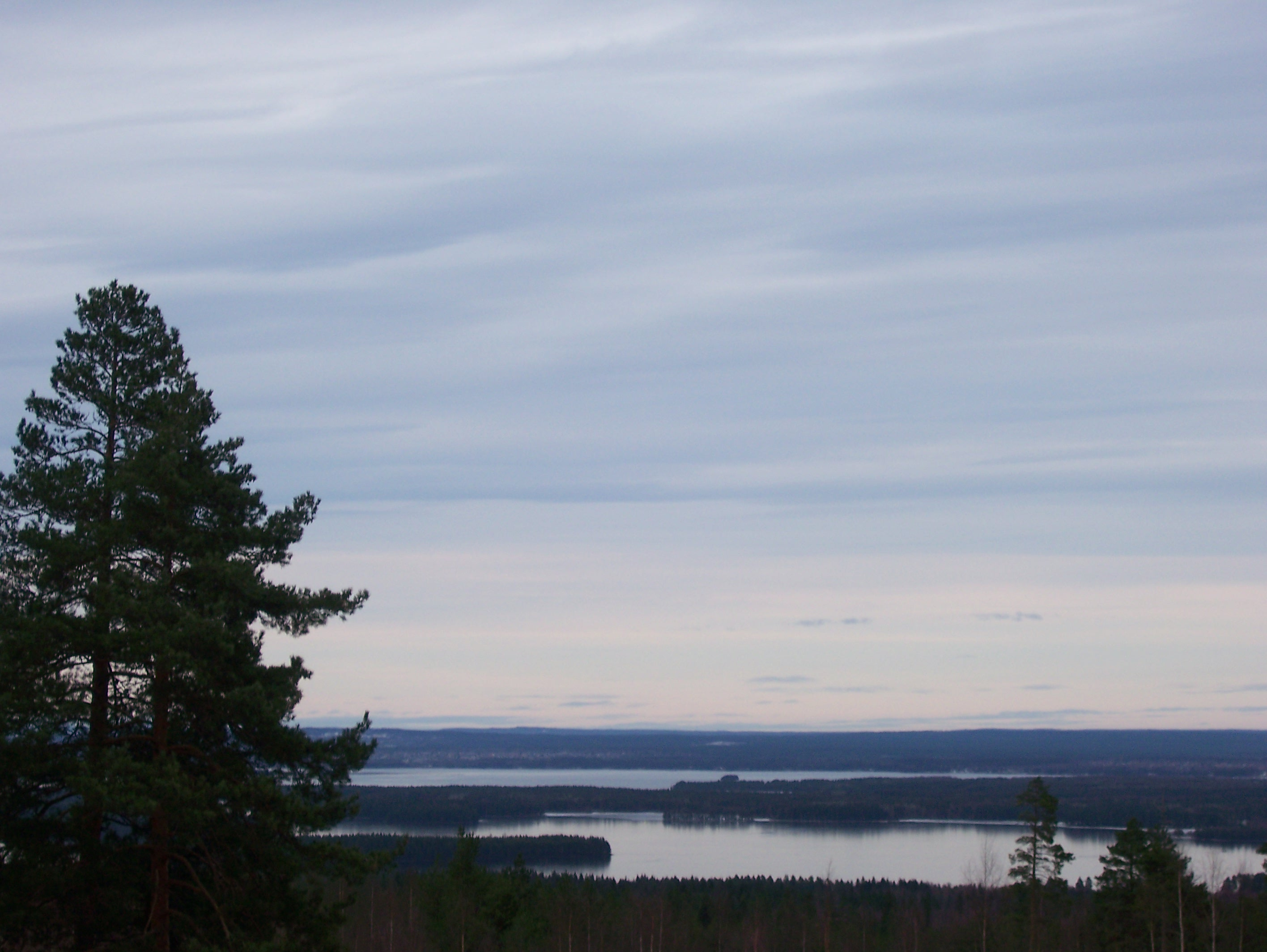
- View from Gesunda

- Location within Dalarna Location within Sweden
- Coordinates: 60°53′11″N 14°32′38″E
- Country: Sweden
- Province: Dalarna
- County: Dalarna County
- Municipality: Mora Municipality

Area
  - Total: 0.81 km^{2} (0.31 sq mi)

Population (31 December 2010)
  - Total: 229
  - Density: 282/km^{2} (730/sq mi)
- Time zone: UTC+1 (CET)
  - Summer (DST): UTC+2 (CEST)

Gesunda is a locality situated in Mora Municipality, Dalarna County, Sweden with 229 inhabitants in 2010.
