= Bonäs =

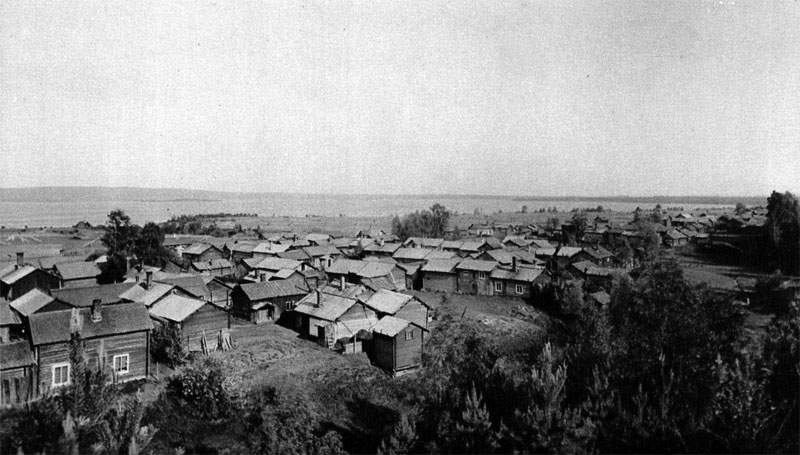
- Bonäs circa 1925

- Location within Dalarna Location within Sweden
- Coordinates: 61°04′20″N 14°29′14″E
- Country: Sweden
- Province: Dalarna
- County: Dalarna County
- Municipality: Mora Municipality

Area
  - Total: 0.92 km^{2} (0.36 sq mi)

Population (31 December 2010)
  - Total: 457
  - Density: 495/km^{2} (1,280/sq mi)
- Time zone: UTC+1 (CET)
  - Summer (DST): UTC+2 (CEST)
- Climate: Dfc

Bonäs is a locality situated in Mora Municipality, Dalarna County, Sweden with 457 inhabitants in 2010.
