= Våmhus =

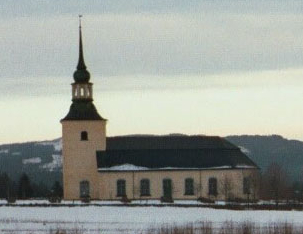
- Våmhus Church in December 2011

- Location within Dalarna Location within Sweden
- Coordinates: 61°07′01″N 14°28′13″E
- Country: Sweden
- Province: Dalarna
- County: Dalarna County
- Municipality: Mora Municipality

Area
  - Total: 1.74 km^{2} (0.67 sq mi)

Population (31 December 2010)
  - Total: 857
  - Density: 491/km^{2} (1,270/sq mi)
- Time zone: UTC+1 (CET)
  - Summer (DST): UTC+2 (CEST)

Våmhus is a locality situated in Mora Municipality, Dalarna County, Sweden with 857 inhabitants in 2010. It is situated by the Orsa Lake's northwest beach.

Våmhus has a characteristic local dialect, Våmhusmål, distinct from other Dalecarlian dialects. Due to the relatively isolated location of Våmhus the Våmhusmål is still in use to some extent among the local population, although like all Swedish dialects it is in a general decline. The area is also known for its handicraft tradition, including basketry and "hair jewelry"(jewelry made of human hair).

The present urban area answers to an older parish by the same name, which covered 14 small villages:

- Kumbelnäs
- Vidbäcken
- Västra Storbyn
- Brändhol
- Myran
- Östra Storbyn
- Limbäck
- Moren
- Sivarsbacken
- Höjen
- Björkvassla
- Bäck
- Indor
- Heden

== Notable residents ==
Eric Wickman, born Martis Jerk, founder of Greyhound Lines
