= Witch trials in Catalonia =

Witch trials took place in the Principality of Catalonia in Spain between the 14th-century and 1767. Witch trials were comparably uncommon in Spain, and most of them took place in Catalonia and Navarre. While witch trials were uncommon in the rest of Spain, the witch trials in Catalonia had similarities with the witch trials in the rest of Western Europe, and are therefore a separate chapter in the context of witch trials in Spain. Around 400 women were prosecuted for witchcraft in Catalonia.

In the Catalan Pyrenees during the Kingdom of Aragon, in 1424 the Code of Ordinances of the Àneu Valleys were enacted and is the first legal text in Europe that specifically addresses the persecution of witchcraft and provides insight into medieval legislation related to the phenomenon of witchcraft.

== Background ==
The first witch trials in Catalonia are noted to have taken place as early as the 14th century. They normally resulted in mild sentences, such as fasting and pilgrimages. Te first trial documented is against Sança de Camins and took place in Barcelona in 1419. In 1427, an important case took place in Amer in Girona, were a woman by the name Margarida Devesa was accused for having caused the earthquake by having sacrificed children to Satan. She was acquitted by the Inquisition, but the case are believed to have influenced the strong belief in witchraft among the population in Catalonia.

== Witch hunt ==
The witch trials in Catalonia became more common in the early 17th century. Between 1615 and 1627, a mass witch hunt took place in Catalonia, which resulted in a number of witch trials in several locations.

Among the witch trials were the Terrassa witch trial (1615–1619) and the Viladrau witch trials (1618–1622), with six and fourteen executions respectively. In parallel, there were six witchcraft-related executions in Lluçanès, four in Taradell, four in Seva and four in El Bruc, three in Rupit and one in Vilalleons.

In the Vallès region, twenty people were executed: eight in Granollers (two of whom were men), six in Terrasa, three in Castellar del Vallès and one in Palau de Plegamans in Sant Miquel de Toudell, Sentmenat and La Garriga. Three were executed in the Bages region: one in Santpedor, one in Manresa, and one (Jerònima Muntanyola) in Sallent.

Following the arrest of Caterina Freixa on 8 November 1619, between 1619 and 1622, a widespread debate opened between supporters of hunting and its opponents after fourteen prestigious Catalan jurists linked to Generalitat de Catalunya (among them Joan Pere Fontanella) signed a document in defence of Caterina Freixa's innocence to try to avoid her death sentence, marking the beginning of the end of witch hunt in Catalonia.

In Sant Feliu de Pallerols, Pere Torrent "Cufí" was executed for being a wizard. In 1622, the Royal Audience and the Spanish Inquisition took control over the witch hunt, which resulted in less executions until the witch hunt ended in 1627.

A second witch hunt took place in 1643, when 32 women were put on trial for sorcery in Capcir. They were however eventually released by the Bishop of Alet. After this, the witch trials in Catalonia became fewer. On 8 January 1767, María Pujol was executed for witchcraft in Catalonia. This was the last witchcraft execution in Catalonia and likely in Spain.

== Legal process ==
In Catalonia, the witch trials were normally conducted by local secular courts, not by the Spanish Inquisition, who generally prioritised heresy rather than witchcraft persecutions, and often suppressed witch trials when they occurred. The secular courts issued investigations of witchcraft, used torture towards suspects, and conducted executions by hanging rather than by burning at the stake. The witch hunt in Catalonia centered around primarily women, who were accused of having attended the witches' sabbath, making a pact with Satan, and having caused natural disasters and causing bad weather, infertility, miscarriages, and illness among humans and animals. The witch hunts often occurred during periods of natural disasters such as earthquakes, floods, storms or other natural disasters which negatively affected the crops, or during times of epidemics.

== Aftermath ==
In January 2022, the Parliament of Catalonia passed a resolution to formally pardon more than 1,000 people, mostly women, who were executed for witchcraft between the 15th and 18th centuries. The resolution came after an investigation by Catalan magazine Sàpiens which published a census of witch trials that took place in Catalonia.
