= Witch trials in Spain =

The Witch trials in Spain were few in comparison with most of Europe. The Spanish Inquisition preferred to focus on the crime of heresy and, consequently, did not consider the persecution of witchcraft a priority and in fact discouraged it rather than have it conducted by the secular courts. This was similar to the Witch trials in Portugal and, with a few exceptions, mainly successful. However, while the Inquisition discouraged witch trials in Spain proper, it did encourage the particularly severe Witch trials in the Spanish Netherlands.

== History ==
The Spanish Reconquista was followed by the Spanish Inquisition, who focused on attaining religious conformity by persecutions of the Jews and the Muslim Moors and their baptized descendants, which was considered a top priority by the church. Persecution of witchcraft was therefore not regarded with much interest in Spain. The Malleus Maleficarum (1486) was in fact published almost at the end of the reconquista.

By the early 16th-century, nevertheless, the witchcraft ideology was accepted in Spain. The Kingdom of Navarre had been conquered and became a part of Spain in 1512 with the excuse that heretic beliefs and religious nonconformity was rampant in Navarre, which created a tense situation in the area. This situation eventually resulted in one of the earliest mass witch trials in Europe: the Navarre witch trials (1525-26). On the assignment of the Navarrese authorities, a witchcraft committee was formed and a commissioner travelled the Pyrenées to identify witches. He managed to have an unknown number of people executed and their property confiscated.

Witch trials were at this point a new crime in Spain, and in August 1525 the Spanish Inquisition ended the Navarre witch trials and issued an investigation as to how such trials should be investigated. In February 1526, the Spanish Inquisition issued a witchcraft regulation in which they stated, that while they accepted witches and their participation in the Sabbath of Satan as a reality, they recommended repentance rather than the death sentence for the condemned and banned confiscation of their property. This regulation almost put an end to witch trials in Spain: between 1526 and 1611, the Inquisition focused in heresy and only circa twenty-two people were condemned for sorcery.

After the Navarre witch trials (1525-26), it was to be fifty years before another witchcraft execution in Navarre. In 1575, the execution of Maria Johan resulted in a big witch hunt, the Navarre witch trials (1575–76) with fifty accused witches, but the Spanish Inquisition managed to transfer these investigation from the secular authorities to the Inquisition, resulting in no further executions.

However, the Spanish Inquisition experienced a few setbacks when it failed to prevent local secular courts from conducting witch trials. This resulted in one of the largest mass witch trials in Europe outside of Germany: the Basque witch trials in 1609. A second incident was a series of severe witchcraft persecutions in Catalonia in 1615–1630, managed by the local secular courts, which resulted in about one hundred executions before the Inquisition managed to take control of the situation.

After this, the Spanish Inquisition had greater success in its policy to prioritize heresy before witchcraft and minimize the witch trials, and only a few isolated cases of witchcraft executions conducted by local secular courts are known until they died out as well in the mid-17th-century. María Pujol was probably the last person executed for witchcraft in Spain, in 1767, after a long period without witch trials.

== See also ==
- Witch trials in the early modern period
