= European witchcraft =

Belief in witchcraft in Europe

European witchcraft can be traced back to classical antiquity, when magic and religion were closely entwined. During the pagan era of ancient Rome, there were laws against harmful magic. After Christianization, the medieval Catholic Church began to see witchcraft (maleficium) as a blend of black magic and apostasy involving a pact with the Devil. During the early modern period, witch hunts became widespread in Europe, partly fueled by religious tensions, societal anxieties, and economic upheaval. European belief in witchcraft gradually dwindled during and after the Age of Enlightenment.

One text that shaped the witch-hunts was the Malleus Maleficarum, a 1486 treatise that provided a framework for identifying, prosecuting, and punishing witches. During the 16th and 17th centuries, there was a wave of witch trials across Europe, resulting in tens of thousands of executions and many more prosecutions. Usually, accusations of witchcraft were made by neighbours and followed from social tensions. Accusations were most often made against women, the elderly, and marginalized individuals. Women made accusations as often as men. The common people believed that magical healers (called 'cunning folk' or 'wise people') could undo bewitchment. These magical healers were sometimes denounced as harmful witches themselves, but seem to have made up a minority of the accused. This dark period of history reflects the confluence of superstition, fear, and authority, as well as the societal tendency of scapegoating. A feminist interpretation of the witch trials is that misogyny led to the association of women and malevolent witchcraft.

In the 17th century, Russia also had witchcraft trials, and three out of four people accused of being witches were men. Witches were often accused of sorcery and engaging in supernatural activities, leading to their excommunication and execution. In some cases, witchcraft accusations came to be used as a political weapon against individuals who posed threats to the ruling czar. In others, the accused had participated in rituals thought to be part of a regular folk healing practice.

Since the 1940s, diverse neopagan witchcraft movements have emerged in Europe, seeking to revive and reinterpret historical pagan and mystical practices. Wicca, pioneered by Gerald Gardner, is the biggest and most influential. Inspired by the now-discredited witch-cult theory and ceremonial magic, Wicca emphasizes a connection to nature, the divine, and personal growth. Stregheria is a distinctly Italian form of neopagan witchcraft. Many of these neopagans self-identify as "witches".

== Concept ==
The concept of malevolent magic has since been found among cultures worldwide, and it is prominent in some cultures today. Most societies have believed in, and feared, an ability by some individuals to cause supernatural harm and misfortune to others. This may come from mankind's tendency "to want to assign occurrences of remarkable good or bad luck to agency, either human or superhuman".

Historians and anthropologists see the concept of "witchcraft" as one of the ways humans have tried to explain strange misfortune. Some cultures have feared witchcraft much less than others, because they tend to have other explanations for strange misfortune; for example that it was caused by gods, spirits, demons or fairies, or by other humans who have unwittingly cast the evil eye. For example, the Gaels of Ireland and the Scottish Highlands historically held a strong belief in fairy folk, who could cause supernatural harm, and witch-hunting was very rare in these regions compared to other regions of the British Isles.

Ronald Hutton outlined five key characteristics ascribed to witches and witchcraft by most cultures that believe in the concept. Traditionally, witchcraft was believed to be the use of magic to cause harm or misfortune to others; it was used by the witch against their own community; it was seen as immoral and often thought to involve communion with evil beings; powers of witchcraft were believed to have been acquired through inheritance or initiation; and witchcraft could be thwarted by defensive magic, persuasion, intimidation or physical punishment of the alleged witch.

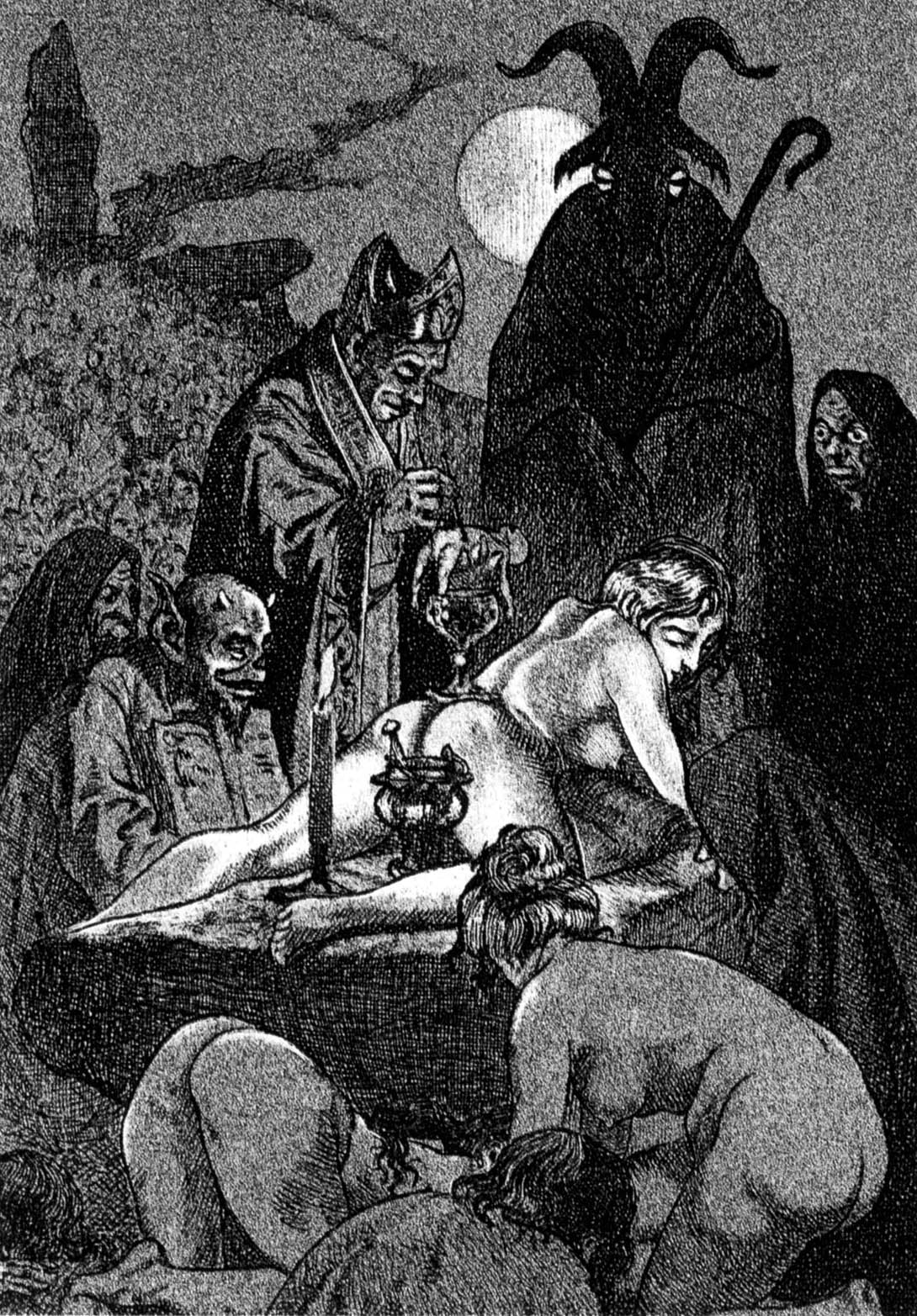
Illustration by Martin van Maële, of a Witches' Sabbath, in the 1911 edition of La Sorcière by Jules Michelet

The Christian concept of witchcraft derives from Old Testament laws against it. European Christianity viewed witchcraft as a blend of sorcery and apostasy (or heresy). Witches were believed to renounce Christ, the sacraments and salvation, instead performing Black Masses and making a pact with the Devil, through which they gained powers of sorcery. In medieval and early modern Europe, many common folk who were Christians believed in both good and bad magic. As opposed to the helpful magic of folk healers, witchcraft was seen as evil.

=== Pre-modern beliefs about witchcraft ===
In medieval and early modern Europe, witches were usually believed to be women who used black magic (maleficium) against their community, and often to have communed with demons or the Devil. Witches were commonly believed to cast curses; a spell or set of magical words and gestures intended to inflict supernatural harm. Cursing could also involve inscribing runes or sigils on an object to give that object magical powers; burning or binding a wax or clay image (a poppet) of a person to affect them magically; or using herbs, animal parts and other substances to make potions or poisons; among other means. A common belief was that witches tended to use something from their victim's body to work black magic against them; for example hair, nail clippings, clothing, or bodily waste.

Witches were believed to work in secret, sometimes alone and sometimes with other witches. They were sometimes said to hold gatherings at night where they worked black magic and transgressed social norms by engaging in cannibalism, incest and open nudity.

Another common belief was that witches had a demonic helper or "familiar", often in animal form. Witches were also often thought to be able to shapeshift into animals themselves, particularly cats and owls.

Witchcraft was blamed for many kinds of misfortune. By far the most common kind of harm attributed to witchcraft was illness or death suffered by adults, their children, or their animals. "Certain ailments, like impotence in men, infertility in women, and lack of milk in cows, were particularly associated with witchcraft". Illnesses that were poorly understood were more likely to be blamed on witchcraft. Edward Bever writes: "Witchcraft was particularly likely to be suspected when a disease came on unusually swiftly, lingered unusually long, could not be diagnosed clearly, or presented some other unusual symptoms".

It was thought witchcraft could be thwarted by protective magic or counter-magic, which could be provided by the 'cunning folk' or 'wise people'. This included charms, talismans and amulets, anti-witch marks, witch bottles, witch balls, and burying objects such as horse skulls inside the walls of buildings. People believed that bewitchment could be broken by physically punishing the alleged witch, such as by banishing, wounding, torturing or killing them. "In most societies, however, a formal and legal remedy was preferred to this sort of private action", whereby the alleged witch would be prosecuted and then formally punished if found guilty.

==== Witches and folk healers ====
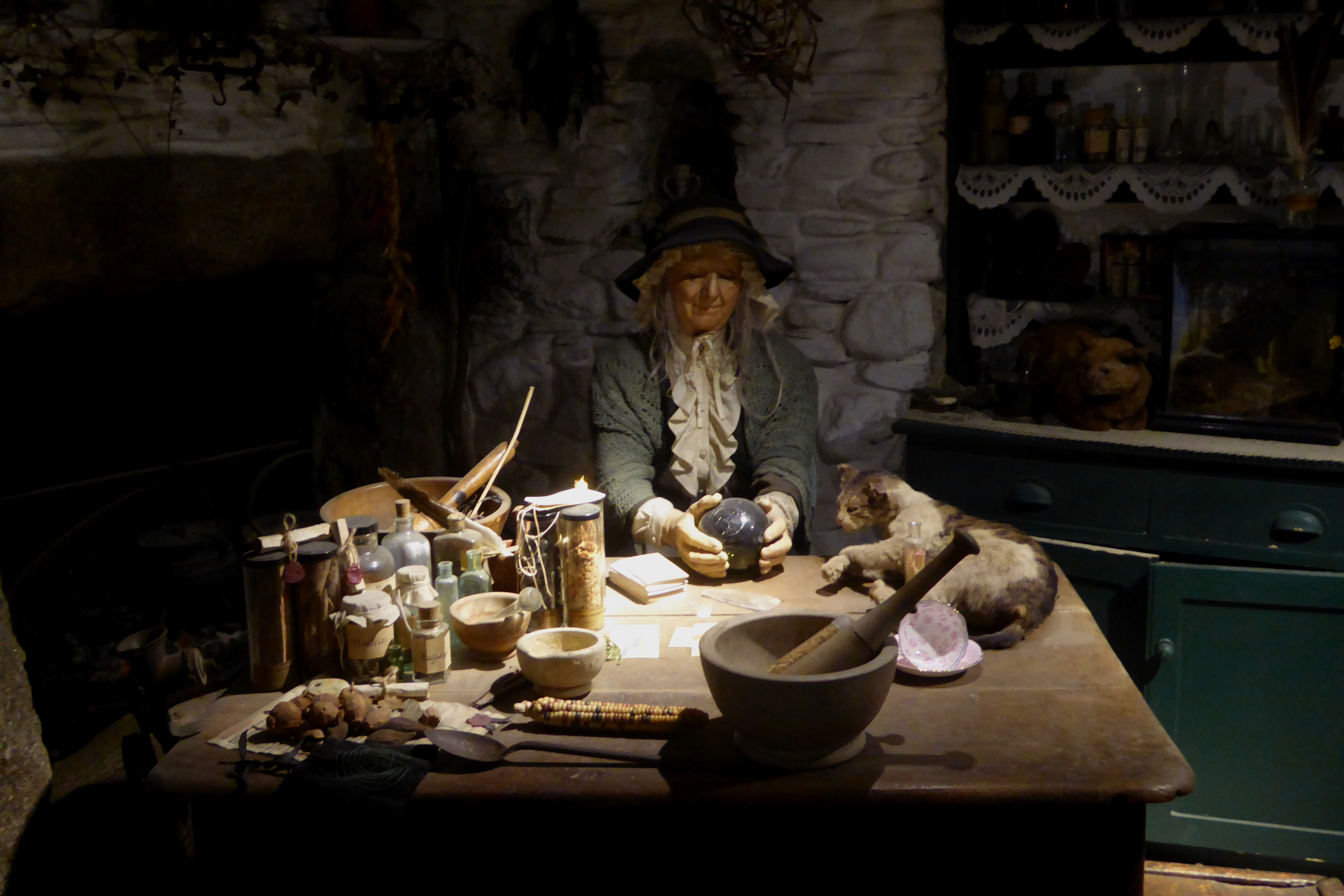
Diorama of a cunning woman or wise woman in the Museum of Witchcraft and Magic

Most societies that have believed in harmful witchcraft or 'black' magic have also believed in helpful or 'white' magic. In these societies, practitioners of helpful magic provided services such as breaking the effects of witchcraft, healing, divination, finding lost or stolen goods, and love magic. In Britain they were commonly known as cunning folk or wise people. Alan McFarlane writes that they might be called 'white', 'good', or 'unbinding' witches, as well as blessers or wizards, but were more often known as cunning folk. Historian Owen Davies says the term "white witch" was rarely used before the 20th century. Ronald Hutton uses the general term "service magicians". Often these people were involved in identifying alleged witches.

Such magic-workers "were normally contrasted with the witch who practised maleficium—that is, magic used for harmful ends". In the early years of the witch hunts "the cunning folk were widely tolerated by church, state and general populace". Some of the more hostile churchmen and secular authorities tried to smear folk-healers and magic-workers by branding them 'witches' and associating them with harmful 'witchcraft', but generally the masses did not accept this and continued to make use of their services. The English MP and skeptic Reginald Scot sought to disprove magic and witchcraft, writing in The Discoverie of Witchcraft (1584), "At this day it is indifferent to say in the English tongue, 'she is a witch' or 'she is a wise woman'". Emma Wilby says folk magicians in Europe were viewed ambivalently by communities, and were considered as capable of harming as of healing, which could lead to their being accused as "witches" in the negative sense. She suggests some English "witches" convicted of consorting with demons may have been cunning folk whose supposed fairy familiars had been demonised.

Hutton says that healers and cunning folk "were sometimes denounced as witches, but seem to have made up a minority of the accused in any area studied". Likewise, Davies says "relatively few cunning-folk were prosecuted under secular statutes for witchcraft" and were dealt with more leniently than alleged witches. The Constitutio Criminalis Carolina (1532) of the Holy Roman Empire, and the Danish Witchcraft Act of 1617, stated that workers of folk magic should be dealt with differently from witches. It was suggested by Richard Horsley that cunning folk (devins-guerisseurs, 'diviner-healers') made up a significant proportion of those tried for witchcraft in France and Switzerland, but more recent surveys conclude that they made up less than 2% of the accused. However, Éva Pócs says that half the accused witches in Hungary seem to have been healers, and Kathleen Stokker says the "vast majority" of Norway's accused witches were folk healers.

==== Accusations of witchcraft ====
Witchcraft accusations were often a form of scapegoating (casting blame for misfortune), and often resulted in prosecution, as well as torture and killing, of alleged witches. In pre-modern Europe, most of those accused were women, and accusations of witchcraft usually came from their neighbors who accused them of inflicting harm or misfortune by magical means. Macfarlane found that women made accusations of witchcraft as much as men did. Deborah Willis adds, "The number of witchcraft quarrels that began between women may actually have been higher; in some cases, it appears that the husband as 'head of household' came forward to make statements on behalf of his wife". Hutton and Davies note that folk healers were sometimes accused of witchcraft, but made up a minority of the accused. It is also possible that a small proportion of accused witches may have genuinely sought to harm by magical means.

Éva Pócs writes that reasons for accusations of witchcraft fall into four general categories:

1. A person was caught in the act of positive or negative sorcery
2. A well-meaning sorcerer or healer lost their clients' or the authorities' trust
3. A person did nothing more than gain the enmity of their neighbors
4. A person was reputed to be a witch and surrounded with an aura of witch-beliefs or occultism.

She identifies three kinds of witch in popular belief:

- The "neighborhood witch" or "social witch": a witch who curses a neighbor following some dispute.
- The "magical" or "sorcerer" witch: either a professional healer, sorcerer, seer or midwife, or a person who was thought to have used magic to increase her fortune to the perceived detriment of a neighboring household; due to neighborhood or community rivalries, and the ambiguity between positive and negative magic, such individuals can become branded as witches.
- The "supernatural" or "night" witch: portrayed in court narratives as a demon appearing in visions and dreams.

"Neighborhood witches" are the product of neighborhood tensions, and are found only in village communities where the inhabitants largely rely on each other. Such accusations follow the breaking of some social norm, such as the failure to return a borrowed item, and any person part of the normal social exchange could potentially fall under suspicion. Claims of "sorcerer" witches and "supernatural" witches could arise out of social tensions, but not exclusively; the supernatural witch often had nothing to do with communal conflict, but expressed tensions between the human and supernatural worlds; and in Eastern and Southeastern Europe such supernatural witches became an ideology explaining calamities that befell whole communities.

The historian Norman Gevitz has written:

[T]he medical arts played a significant and sometimes pivotal role in the witchcraft controversies of seventeenth-century New England. Not only were physicians and surgeons the principal professional arbiters for determining natural versus preternatural signs and symptoms of disease, they occupied key legislative, judicial, and ministerial roles relating to witchcraft proceedings. Forty six male physicians, surgeons, and apothecaries are named in court transcripts or other contemporary source materials relating to New England witchcraft. These practitioners served on coroners' inquests, performed autopsies, took testimony, issued writs, wrote letters, or committed people to prison, in addition to diagnosing and treating patients.

It was commonly believed that individuals with power and prestige were involved in acts of witchcraft and even cannibalism.

== History ==
=== Antiquity ===
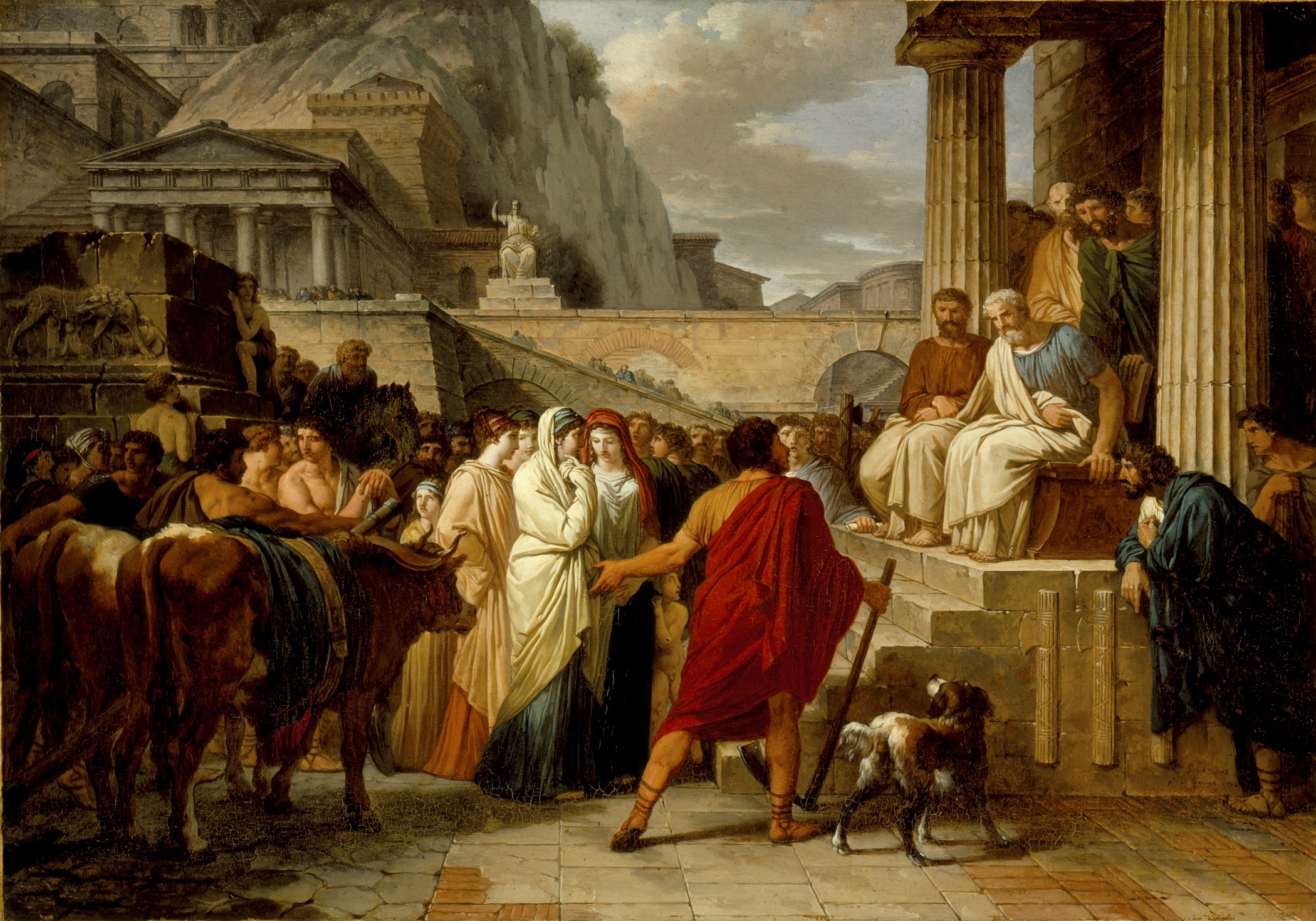
Caius Furius Cressinus Accused of Sorcery, Jean-Pierre Saint-Ours, 1792

In ancient Greece and Roman Empire, circa 8th century BCE - 5th century CE, individuals known as "goêtes" practiced various forms of magic, including divination, spellcasting, and invoking supernatural entities. While some forms of magic were integrated into religious practices, others were seen as superstitious and potentially harmful.

There are accounts of people being prosecuted and punished for witchcraft in the ancient Greco-Roman world, before Christianity. In ancient Greece, for example, Theoris, a woman of Lemnos, was prosecuted for and executed along with her family. Records refer to her as pharmakis (potion specialist), mantis (diviner), and hiereia (priestess), but the sentence against her and her family was for asebeia (impiety).

During the pagan era of ancient Rome, there were laws against harmful magic. According to Pliny, the 5th century BC laws of the Twelve Tables laid down penalties for uttering harmful incantations and for stealing the fruitfulness of someone else's crops by magic. "The clause forbidding evil incantations does not forbid incantations per se, but only incantations taking the form of song intended to harm" (mala carmen). The only recorded trial involving this law was that of Gaius Furius Chresimus in 191 BC. He was acquitted of using spells to draw the fruitfulness of other fields into his own.

The Classical Latin word veneficium meant both poisoning and causing harm by magic (such as magic potions), although ancient people would not have distinguished between the two. In 331 BC, a deadly epidemic hit Rome and at least 170 women were executed for causing it by veneficium. However, some portions of these individuals were tested and killed by being made to drink their own medical potions, indicating the charge was straightforward poisoning. In 184–180 BC, another epidemic hit Italy, and about 5,000 were executed for veneficium. Hutton states that if even some portion were charged for killing with magical rites "then the Republican Romans hunted witches on a scale unknown anywhere else in the ancient world, and any other time in European history". However, he acknowledges that it is impossible to tell whether any percentage of these charges were for poisoning or the use of magic.

Under the Lex Cornelia de sicariis et veneficis ("Cornelian law against assassins and poisoners") of 81 BC, killing by veneficium carried the death penalty. During the early Imperial era, the Lex Cornelia began to be used more broadly against other kinds of magic, including "making of love potions, the enactment of rites to enchant, bind or restrain, the possession of books containing magical recipes, and the 'arts of magic' in general." Modestinus, a Roman jurist of the early third century AD, wrote that sacrifices made for evil purposes could be punished under the Lex Cornelia. The Pauli Sententiae, from the same century, says the Lex Cornelia imposed a penalty on those who made sacrifices at night to bewitch someone. It also outlines penalties for giving potions to induce an abortion or to induce love. The magicians were to be burnt at the stake.

Witch characters—women who work powerful evil magic—appear in ancient Roman literature from the first century BC onward. Some of these draw from more neutral models, as seen in Greece. However, there are also distinctly evil figures, typically hags who chant harmful incantations; make poisonous potions from herbs and the body parts of animals and humans; sacrifice children; raise the dead; can control the natural world; can shapeshift themselves and others into animals; and invoke underworld deities and spirits. They include Lucan's Erichtho, Horace's Canidia, Ovid's Dipsas, and Apuleius's Meroe. However, Hutton acknowledges the likelihood that this represents a level of literary license being taken with the historical memory of mass executions of women for veneficium. Another version of the malevolent witch that appeared in Rome was "a highly sexed woman in her prime, fond of young men and inclined to destroy those who reject her." Unique to Rome among its contemporaries as a description of witches, this image was closely related to several stories of demons traded between neighboring and preceding cultures.

Early converts to Christianity looked to Christian clergy to work magic more effectively than the old methods under Roman paganism, and Christianity provided a methodology involving saints and relics, similar to the gods and amulets of the Pagan world. As Christianity became the dominant religion in Europe, its concern with magic lessened. The first Christian Roman emperor, Constantine the Great, introduced new laws against magic in the early 4th century AD. Private divination, and working magic to harm others or to induce lust, were to be punished harshly, but protective magic was not outlawed.

=== Middle Ages ===
==== Medieval laws ====
The early legal codes of most European nations contain laws directed against witchcraft. Thus, for example, the oldest document of Frankish legislation, the Salic law, which was reduced to a written form and promulgated under Clovis, who died 27 November, 511, punishes those who practice magic with various fines, especially when it could be proven that the accused launched a deadly curse. The laws of the Visigoths, which were to some extent founded upon the Roman law, punished witches who had killed any person by their spells with death; while long-continued and obstinate witchcraft, if fully proven, was visited with such severe sentences as slavery for life. The Eastern council in Trullo (692), and certain early Irish canons, treated sorcery as a crime to be visited with excommunication until adequate penance had been performed.

The Pactus Legis Alamannorum, an early 7th-century code of laws of the Alemanni confederation of Germanic tribes, lists witchcraft as a punishable crime on equal terms with poisoning. If a free man accuses a free woman of witchcraft or poisoning, the accused may be disculpated either by twelve people swearing an oath on her innocence or by one of her relatives defending her in a trial by combat. In this case, the accuser is required to pay a fine (Pactus Legis Alamannorum 13). Charles the Great prescribed the death penalty for anyone who would burn witches.

With Christianization, belief in witchcraft came to be seen as superstition. The Council of Leptinnes in 744 drew up a "List of Superstitions", which prohibited sacrifice to saints and created a baptismal formula that required one to renounce works of demons, specifically naming Thor and Odin. Persecution of witchcraft nevertheless persisted throughout most of the Early Middle Ages, into the 10th century.

When Charlemagne imposed Christianity upon the people of Saxony in 789, he proclaimed:

If anyone, deceived by the Devil, shall believe, as is customary among pagans, that any man or woman is a night-witch, and eats men, and on that account burn that person to death... he shall be executed.

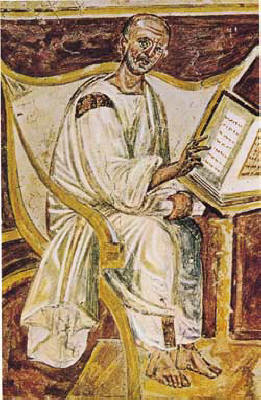
The earliest known portrait of Saint Augustine in a 6th-century fresco, Lateran, Rome

Similarly, the Lombard code of 643 states:

Let nobody presume to kill a foreign serving maid or female slave as a witch, for it is not possible, nor ought to be believed by Christian minds.

This conforms to the thoughts of Saint Augustine of Hippo, who taught that witchcraft did not exist and that the belief in it was heretical.

In 814, Louis the Pious upon his accession to the throne began to take very active measures against all sorcerers and necromancers, and it was owing to his influence and authority that the Council of Paris (829) appealed to the secular courts to carry out any such sentences as the Bishops might pronounce. The consequence was that from this time forward the penalty of witchcraft was death, and there is evidence that if the constituted authority, either ecclesiastical or civil, seemed to slacken in their efforts the populace took the law into their own hands with far more fearful results.

In England, the early Penitentials are greatly concerned with the repression of pagan ceremonies, which under the cover of Christian festivities were very largely practised at Christmas and on New Year's Day. These rites were closely connected with witchcraft, and especially do S. Theodore, S. Aldhelm, Ecgberht of York, and other prelates prohibit the masquerade as a horned animal, a stag, or a bull, which S. Caesarius of Arles had denounced as a "foul tradition", an "evil custom", a "most heinous abomination". The laws of King Æthelstan (924–40), corresponsive with the early French laws, punished any person casting a spell which resulted in death by extracting the extreme penalty.

Among the laws attributed to the Pictish King Cináed mac Ailpin (ruled 843 to 858), "is an important statute which enacts that all sorcerers and witches, and such as invoke spirits, 'and use to seek upon them for helpe, let them be burned to death'. Even then this was obviously no new penalty, but the statutory confirmation of a long-established punishment. So the witches of Forres who attempted the life of King Duffus in the year 968 by the old bane of slowly melting a wax image, when discovered, were according to the law burned at the stake."

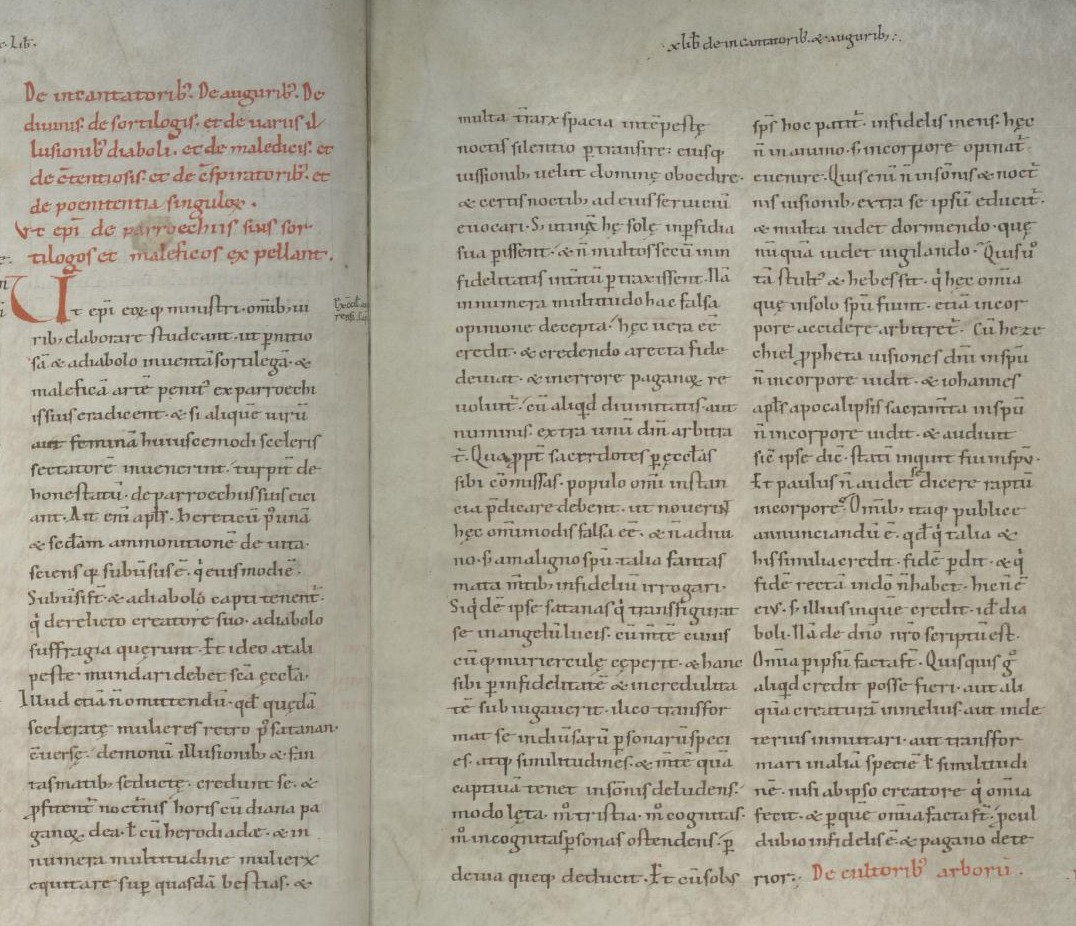
The text of the canon Episcopi in Hs. 119 (Cologne), a manuscript of Decretum Burchardi dated to ca. 1020.

The Canon Episcopi, which was written circa 900 AD (though alleged to date from 314 AD), once more following the teachings of Saint Augustine, declared that witches did not exist and that anyone who believed in them was a heretic. The crucial passage from the Canon Episcopi reads as follows:

It is also not to be omitted that some unconstrained women, perverted by Satan, seduced by illusions and phantasms of demons, believe and openly profess that, in the dead of night, they ride upon certain beasts with the pagan goddess Diana, with a countless horde of women, and in the silence of the dead of the night to fly over vast tracts of country, and to obey her commands as their mistress, and to be summoned to her service on other nights. But it were well if they alone perished in their infidelity and did not draw so many others into the pit of their faithlessness. For an innumerable multitude, deceived by this false opinion, believe this to be true and, so believing, wander from the right faith and relapse into pagan errors when they think that there is any divinity or power except the one God.

P. G. Maxwell-Stewart in "The Emergence of the Christian Witch" wrote:

In the world of late antiquity or the early Middle Ages, it is impossible to define someone as a witch (as opposed, for example, to an amateur herbalist, a heretic or a scold), and none of the legislation of the time attempted to do so. Offenders were designated offenders by virtue of their performing various actions or wearing certain objects declared by the legislation to be condemned or forbidden. For all practical purposes, the 'witch' had not yet been invented. There were only practitioners of various kinds of magic, both male and female, who might belong to any rank of ecclesiastical or lay society, and whose actions might, or might not, bring them within the compass of canon or secular law, depending on external factors that were usually local but could, from time to time, be more general.

The later Middle Ages saw words for these practitioners of harmful magical acts appear in various European languages: sorcière in French, Hexe in German, strega in Italian, and bruja in Spanish. The English term for malevolent practitioners of magic, witch, derived from the earlier Old English term wicce. A person that performs sorcery is referred to as a sorcerer or a witch, conceived as someone who tries to reshape the world through the occult. The word witch is over a thousand years old: Old English formed the compound wiccecræft from wicce ('witch') and cræft ('craft'). The masculine form was wicca ('male sorcerer'). In early modern Scots, the word warlock came to be used as the male equivalent of witch (which can be male or female, but is used predominantly for females).

==== Developing views of the Church ====
It was in the Church's interest, as it expanded, to suppress all competing Pagan methodologies of magic. This could be done only by presenting a cosmology in which Christian miracles were legitimate and credible, whereas non-Christian ones were "of the devil". Hence the following law:

We teach that every priest shall extinguish heathendom, and forbid wilweorthunga (fountain worship), and licwiglunga (incantations of the dead), and hwata (omens), and galdra (magic), and man worship, and the abominations that men exercise in various sorts of witchcraft, and in frithspottum (peace-enclosures) with elms and other trees, and with stones, and with many phantoms.

— Source: 16th Canon law enacted under King Edgar, 10th century AD

While the common people were aware of the difference between witches, who they considered willing to undertake evil actions, such as cursing, and cunning folk who avoided involvement in such activities, the Church attempted to blot out the distinction. In much the same way that culturally distinct non-Christian religions were all lumped together and termed merely "Pagan", so too was all magic lumped together as equally sinful and abhorrent. The earliest written reference to witches as such, from Ælfric's homilies, portrays them as malign.

A rise in the practice of necromancy in the 12th century, spurred on by an influx of texts on magic and diabolism from the Islamic world, had alerted clerical authorities to the potential dangers of malefic magic. Sorcery came to be associated with heresy and apostasy and to be viewed as evil. This elevated concern was slowly expanded to include the common witch, but clerics needed an explanation for why uneducated commoners could perform feats of diabolical sorcery that rivaled those of the most seasoned and learned necromancers, whose magic required the rigorous application of study and complex ritual.

The idea that witches gained their powers through a pact with the Devil provided a satisfactory explanation, and allowed authorities to develop a mythology through which they could project accusations of crimes formerly associated with various heretical sects (cannibalism, ritual infanticide, and the worship of demonic familiars) onto the newly emerging threat of diabolical witchcraft. This pact and the ceremony that accompanied it became widely known as the Witches' Sabbath. The idea of a pact became important—one could be possessed by the Devil and not responsible for one's actions; but to be a witch, one had to sign a pact with the Devil, often to worship him, which was heresy and meant damnation. The idea of an explicit and ceremonial pact with the Devil was crucial to the development of the witchcraft concept, because it provided an explanation that differentiated the figure of the witch from that of the learned necromancer or sorcerer.

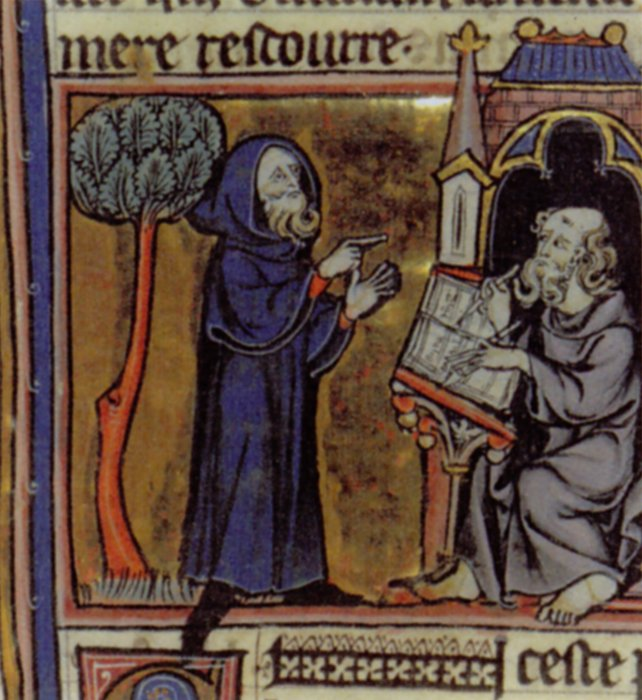
Merlin is said to have been born from the relationship of an incubus with a mortal (illumination from a 13th-century French manuscript)

Gregory of Nyssa (c. 335 – c. 395) had said that demons had children with women called cambions, which added to the children they had between them, contributed to increase the number of demons. However, the first popular account of such a union and offspring does not occur in Western literature until around 1136, when Geoffrey of Monmouth wrote the story of Merlin in his pseudohistorical account of British history, Historia Regum Britanniae (History of the Kings of Britain), in which he reported that Merlin's father was an incubus.

Anne Lawrence-Mathers writes that at that time "... views on demons and spirits were still relatively flexible. There was still a possibility that the daemons of classical tradition were different from the demons of the Bible." Accounts of sexual relations with demons in literature continues with The Life of Saint Bernard by Geoffrey of Auxerre (c. 1160) and the Life and Miracles of St. William of Norwich by Thomas of Monmouth (c. 1173). The theme of sexual relations with demons became a matter of increasing interest for late 12th-century writers.

Prophetiae Merlini (The Prophecies of Merlin), a Latin work of Geoffrey of Monmouth in circulation by 1135, perhaps as a libellus or short work, was the first work about the prophet Myrddin in a language other than Welsh. The Prophetiae was widely read — and believed — much as the prophecies of Nostradamus would be centuries later; John Jay Parry and Robert Caldwell note that the Prophetiae Merlini "were taken most seriously, even by the learned and worldly wise, in many nations", and list examples of this credulity as late as 1445.

It was only beginning in the 1150s that the Church turned its attention to defining the possible roles of spirits and demons, especially with respect to their sexuality and in connection with the various forms of magic which were then believed to exist. Christian demonologists eventually came to agree that sexual relationships between demons and humans happen, but they disagreed on why and how. A common point of view is that demons induce men and women to the sin of lust, and adultery is often considered as an associated sin.

As Christian views on magic continued to evolve and intertwine with changing cultural landscapes, the perception of supernatural practices became increasingly intricate. The Church's endeavors to assert its dominance over alternative belief systems led to the suppression of various magical methodologies. Simultaneously, the conceptualization of witches and their alleged pacts with the Devil solidified during the Early Modern period, resulting in the infamous witch trials. These trials marked a significant turning point in the Church's engagement with magic, as accusations of heinous acts were projected onto the figure of the witch.

==== Increasing fear and early witch-hunts ====
The tale of Theophilus recorded in the 13th century by writer Gautier de Coincy's Les Miracles de la Sainte Vierge bears many similarities to the later legend of Faust. Here, a saintly figure makes a bargain with the keeper of the infernal world but is rescued from paying his debt to society through the mercy of the Blessed Virgin. A depiction of the scene in which he subordinates himself to the Devil appears on the north tympanum of the Cathedrale de Notre Dame de Paris. By 1300, the elements were in place for a witch hunt, and for the next century and a half, fear of witches spread gradually throughout Europe.

In the early 14th century, many accusations were brought against clergymen and other learned people who were capable of reading and writing magic; Pope Boniface VIII (d. 1303) was posthumously tried for apostasy, murder, and sodomy, in addition to allegedly entering into a pact with the Devil (while popes had been accused of crimes before, the demonolatry charge was new). The Templars were also tried as Devil-invoking heretics in 1305–14. The middle years of the 14th century were quieter, but towards the end of the century, accusations increased and were brought against ordinary people more frequently.

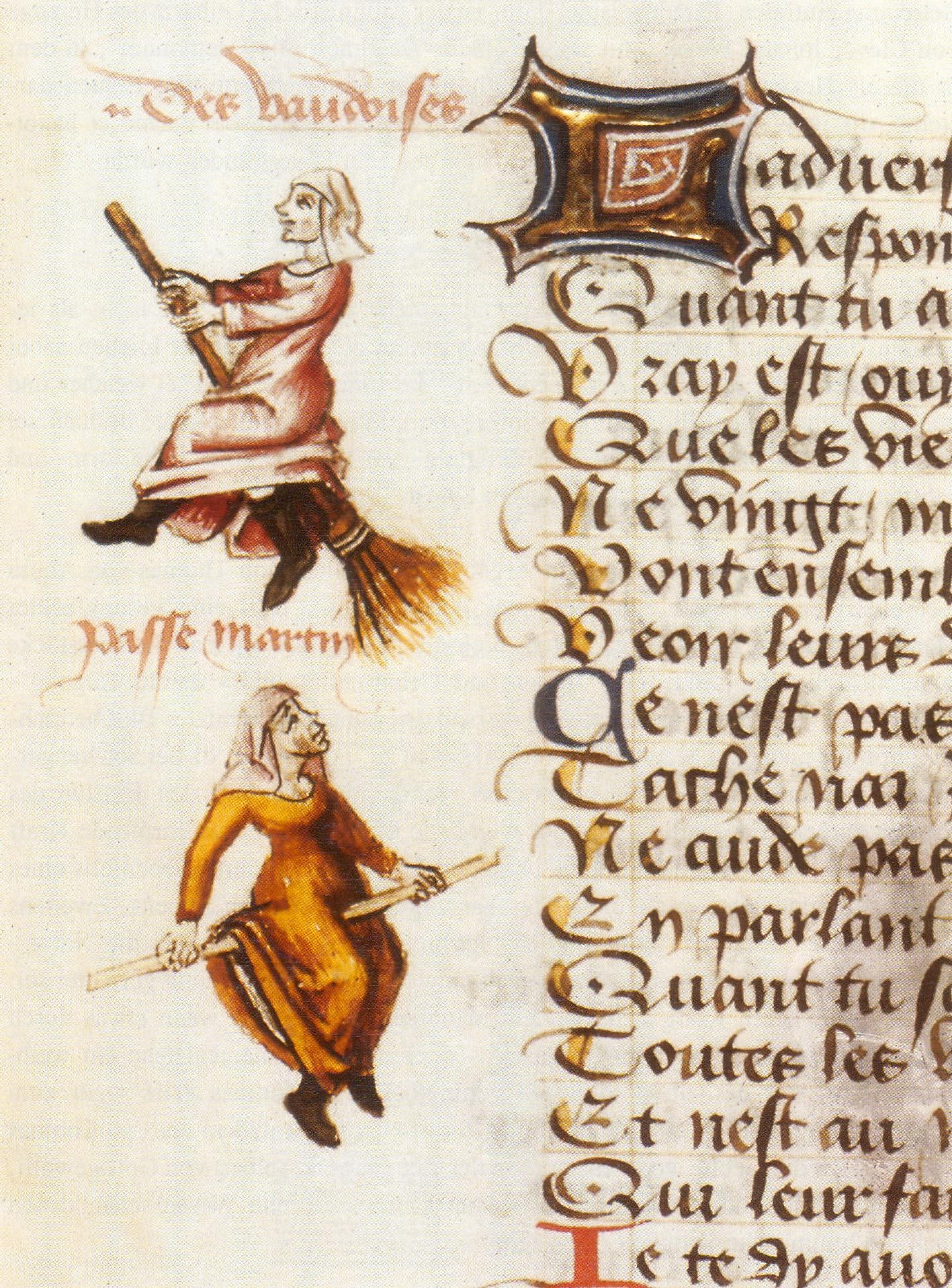
Marginal decorations of "des vaudoises" in Le champion des dames, by Martin Le France, 1451

In 1398, the University of Paris declared that a demonic pact could be implicit; no document need be signed, as the mere act of summoning a demon constituted an implied pact. This freed prosecutors from having to prove the existence of a physical pact. Among Catholics and the secular leadership of late medieval Europe, fears about witchcraft rose to fever pitch and this led to large-scale witch-hunts. Each new conviction reinforced the beliefs in the methods (torture and pointed interrogation) being used to solicit confessions and in the list of accusations to which the accused confessed.

=== Early Modern witch trials ===
A 1555 German print showing the burning of witches. Current scholarly estimates of the number of people executed for witchcraft in Europe vary between 40,000 and 100,000. (Note: Brian P. Levack multiplied the number of known European witch trials by the average rate of conviction and execution, to arrive at a figure of around 60,000 deaths. Anne Lewellyn Barstow adjusted Levack's estimate to account for lost records, estimating 100,000 deaths. Ronald Hutton argues that Levack's estimate had already been adjusted for these, and revises the figure to approximately 40,000.) The number of witch trials in Europe known to have ended in executions is around 12,000.

There were an estimated 110,000 witchcraft trials in Europe between 1450 and 1750, with half of the cases seeing the accused being executed. Witch hunts began to increase first in southern France and Switzerland, during the 14th and 15th centuries. Witch hunts and witchcraft trials rose markedly during the social upheavals of the 16th century, peaking between 1560 and 1660. The peak years of witch-hunts in southwest Germany were from 1561 to 1670.

As the notion spread that all magic involved a pact with the Devil, legal sanctions against witchcraft grew harsher. Tens of thousands of people were executed, and others were imprisoned, tortured, banished, and had lands and possessions confiscated. The majority of those accused were women, though in some regions the majority were men.

Accusations against witches were almost identical to those levelled by 3rd-century pagans against early Christians:

In chapters 6–11 of the Octavius, Caecilius, the pagan opponent of Christianity, accuses Christians of rejecting ancestral beliefs and of failing to imitate the piety of the Romans (chap. 6), of failing to understand the communication of gods with humans (chap. 7), of denying the existence of many gods and accepting only the dregs of society, the most shameful people, into their assemblies and organizing dreadful, nocturnal, secret meetings (chap. 8). They practice indiscriminate sexual activity, worship the head of an ass, worship the genital organs of their priests, and initiate novices by making them kill infants and cannibalize them (chap. 9). Their rites are held in secret, and they have no temples (chap. 10). Finally they are a subversive sect that threatens the stability of the whole world (chap. 11).

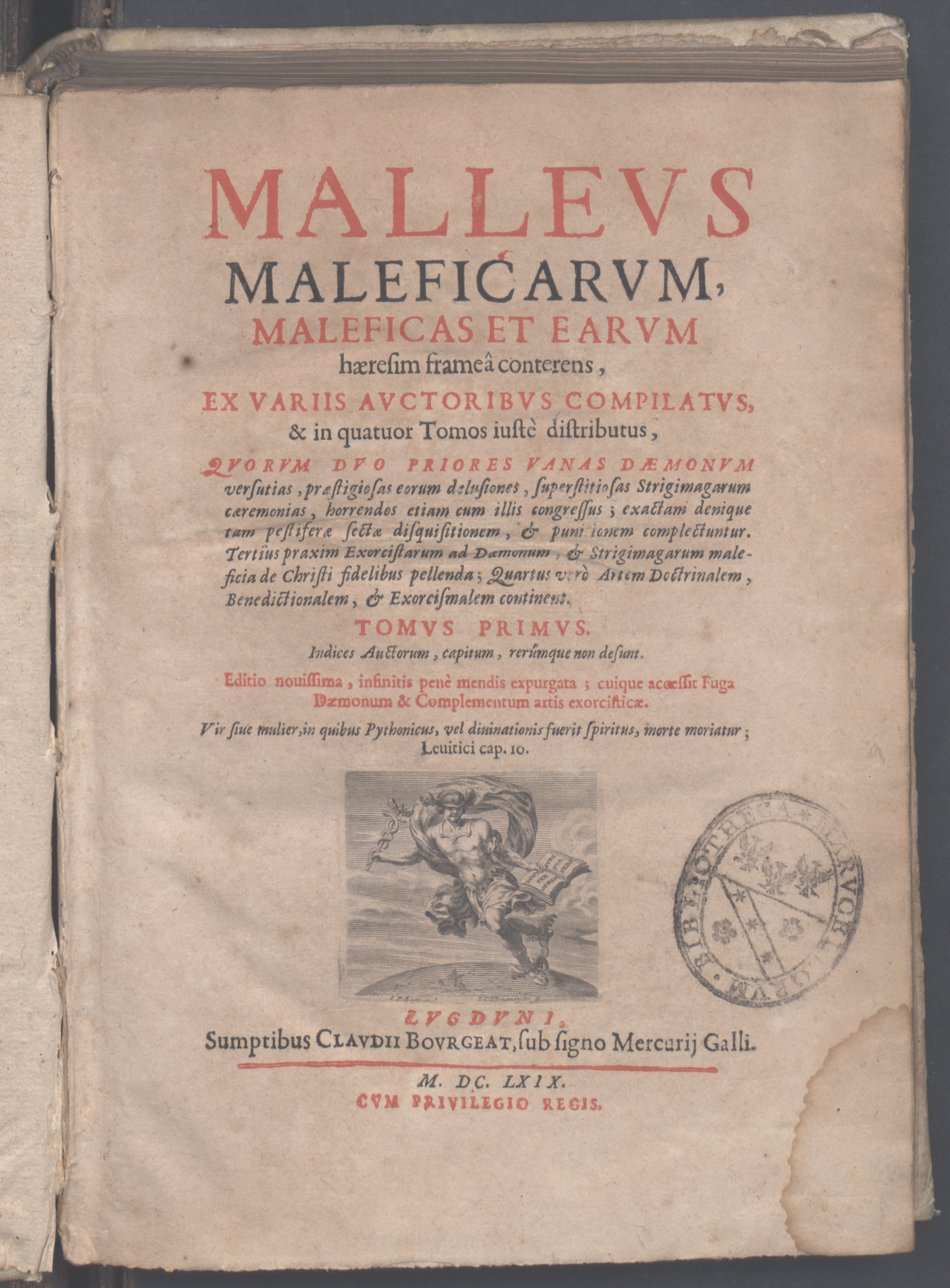
The Malleus Maleficarum was influential in European witch trials

In 1486, Heinrich Kramer, a member of the Dominican Order, published the Malleus Maleficarum (the 'Hammer against the Witches'). It was used by both Catholics and Protestants for several hundred years, outlining how to identify a witch, what makes a woman more likely than a man to be a witch, how to put a witch on trial, and how to punish a witch. The book defines a witch as evil and typically female. It became the handbook for secular courts throughout Europe, but was not used by the Inquisition, which even cautioned against relying on it. It was the most sold book in Europe for over 100 years, after the Bible. Scholars are unclear on just how influential the Malleus was in its day. Less than one hundred years after it was written, the Council of the Inquisitor General in Spain discounted the credibility of the Malleus since it contained numerous errors.

The height of the witch-craze was concurrent with the rise of Renaissance magic in the great humanists of the time (this was called high magic, and the Neoplatonists and Aristotelians that practised it took pains to insist that it was wise and benevolent and nothing like witchcraft, which was considered low magic), which helped abet the rise of the craze. Witchcraft was held to be the worst of heresies, and early skepticism slowly faded from view almost entirely. The origins of the accusations against witches in the Early Modern period are eventually present in trials against heretics, which trials include claims of secret meetings, orgies, and the consumption of babies.

Persecution continued through the Protestant Reformation in the 16th century, and the Protestants and Catholics both continued witch trials with varying numbers of executions from one period to the next. The "Caroline Code", the basic law code of the Holy Roman Empire (1532) imposed heavy penalties on witchcraft. As society became more literate (due mostly to the invention of the printing press in the 1440s), increasing numbers of books and tracts fueled the witch fears.

From the sixteenth century on, there were some writers who protested against witch trials, witch hunting and the belief that witchcraft existed. Among them were Johann Weyer, Reginald Scot, and Friedrich Spee. The Jura Mountains in southern Germany provided a small respite from the insanity; there, torture was imposed only within the precise limits of the Caroline Code of 1532, little attention was paid to the accusations of or by children, and charges had to be brought openly before a suspect could be arrested. These limitations contained the mania in that area. In Frankfurt, the legend of Faust began to circulate in chapbook form around 1587, when Historia von D. Johann Fausten was published.

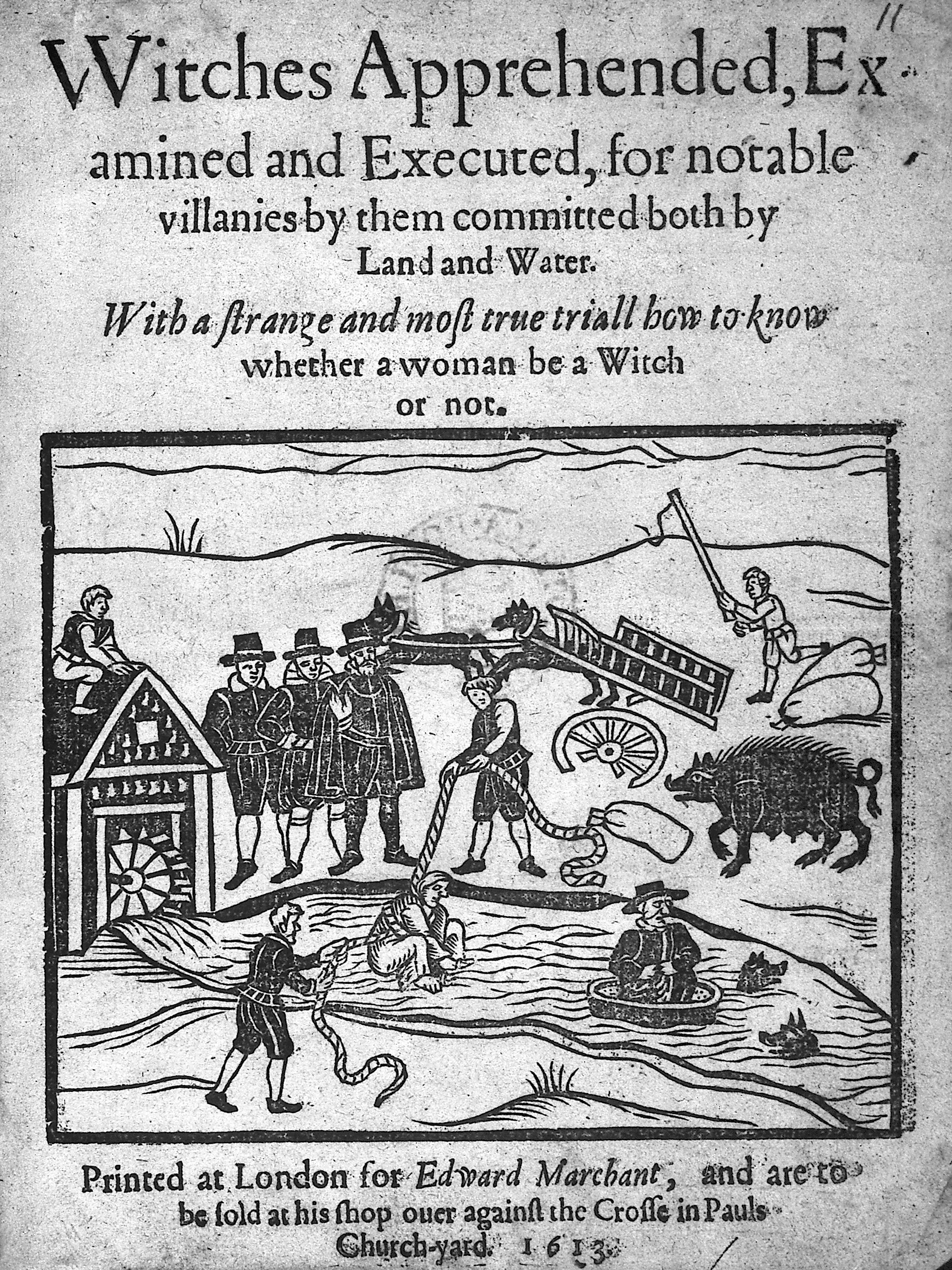
A 1613 English pamphlet showing "Witches apprehended, examined and executed"

The craze reached its height between 1560 and 1660. After 1580, the Jesuits replaced the Dominicans as the chief Catholic witch-hunters, and the Catholic Rudolf II (1576–1612) presided over a long persecution in Austria. The nuns of Loudun (1630) (Note: The story of the Loudun possessions was novelized by Aldous Huxley as The Devils of Loudun and made into a film by Ken Russell.) provide an example of the craze during this time. The nuns had conspired to accuse Father Urbain Grandier of witchcraft by faking symptoms of possession and torment; they feigned convulsions, rolled and gibbered on the ground, and accused Grandier of indecencies. Grandier was convicted and burned; however, after the plot succeeded, the symptoms of the nuns only grew worse, and they became more and more sexual in nature. This attests to the degree of mania and insanity present in such witch trials.

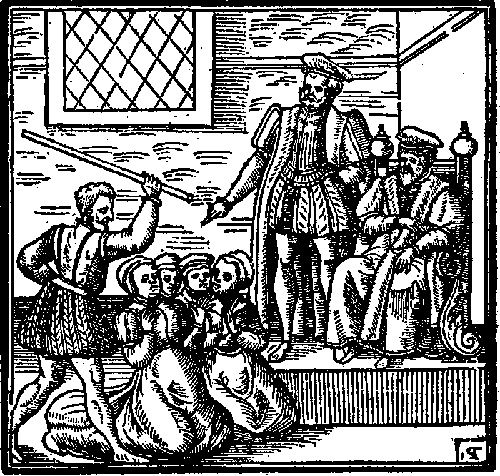
Illustration of witches, perhaps being tortured before James VI, from his Daemonologie (1597)

After the early 17th century, popular sentiment began to turn against the practice. In 1682, King Louis XIV prohibited further witch-trials in France. In 1687, Louis XIV issued an edict against witchcraft that was rather moderate compared to former ones; it ignored black cats and other lurid fantasies of the witch mania. After this, the number of witches accused and condemned fell rapidly. In 1736, Great Britain formally ended witch-trials with passage of the Witchcraft Act 1735 (9 Geo. 2. c. 5).

==== In Britain ====
In Wales, fear of witchcraft mounted around the year 1500. There was a growing alarm of women's magic as a weapon aimed against the state and church. The Church made greater efforts to enforce the canon law of marriage, especially in Wales where tradition allowed a wider range of sexual partnerships. There was a political dimension as well, as accusations of witchcraft were levied against the enemies of Henry VII, who was exerting more and more control over Wales. In 1542, the Henry VIII's Witchcraft Acts was passed defining witchcraft as a crime punishable by death and the forfeiture of property.

Witchcraft Act 1603
- Act of Parliament
- Parliament of England
- Long title: An Act against Conjuration, Witchcraft and dealing with evil and wicked spirits
- Citation: 1 Jas. 1. c. 12

Dates
- Royal assent: 7 July 1604
- Repealed: 24 June 1736
Other legislation
Repeals/revokes	Witchcraft Act 1562
Repealed by	Witchcraft Act 1735

Status: Repealed

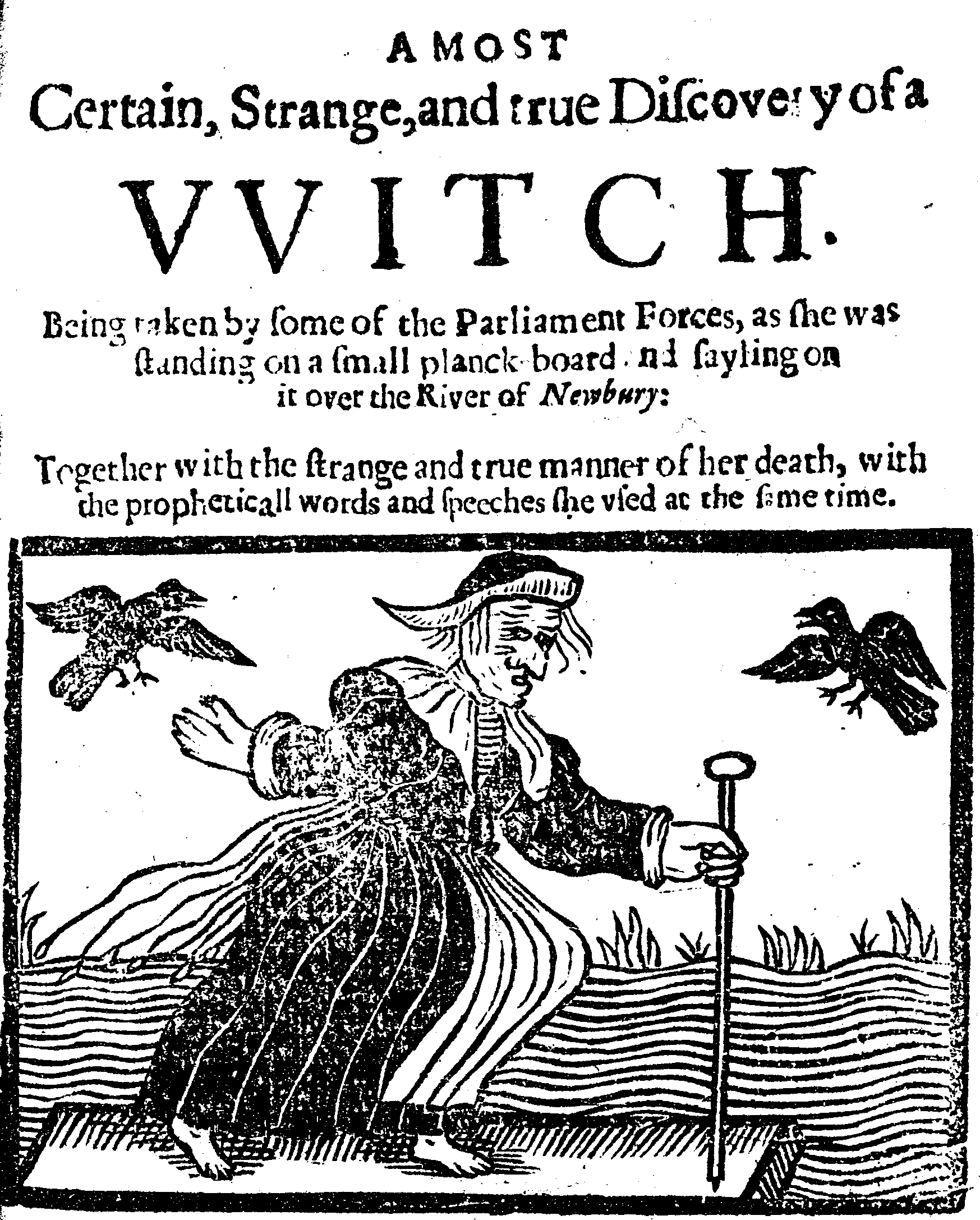
A most certain, strange and true discovery of a witch. Being taken by some of the Parliament forces, as she was standing on a small planck board and sayling on it over the river of Newbury. London, John Hammond, 1643

William Shakespeare wrote about the infamous "Three Witches" in his tragedy Macbeth during the reign of James I, who was notorious for his ruthless prosecution of witchcraft. Becoming king of Scotland in 1567 and of England in 1603, James VI and I brought to Scotland and England continental explanations of witchcraft. He set out the much stiffer Witchcraft Act 1603 (1 Jas. 1. c. 12), which made it a felony under common law. His goal was to focus fear on female communities and large gatherings of women. He thought they threatened his political power so he laid the foundation for witchcraft and occultism policies, especially in Scotland. The point was that a widespread belief in the conspiracy of witches and a witches' Sabbath with the devil deprived women of political influence. Occult power was supposedly a womanly trait because women were weaker and more susceptible to the devil.

In Wales, witchcraft trials heightened in the 16th and 17th centuries, after the fear of it was imported from England. There was a growing alarm of women's magic as a weapon aimed against the state and church. The Church made greater efforts to enforce the canon law of marriage, especially in Wales where tradition allowed a wider range of sexual partnerships. There was a political dimension as well, as accusations of witchcraft were levied against the enemies of Henry VII, who was exerting more and more control over Wales.

The records of the Courts of Great Sessions for Wales, 1536–1736 show that Welsh custom was more important than English law. Custom provided a framework of responding to witches and witchcraft in such a way that interpersonal and communal harmony was maintained, Showing to regard to the importance of honour, social place and cultural status. Even when found guilty, execution did not occur.

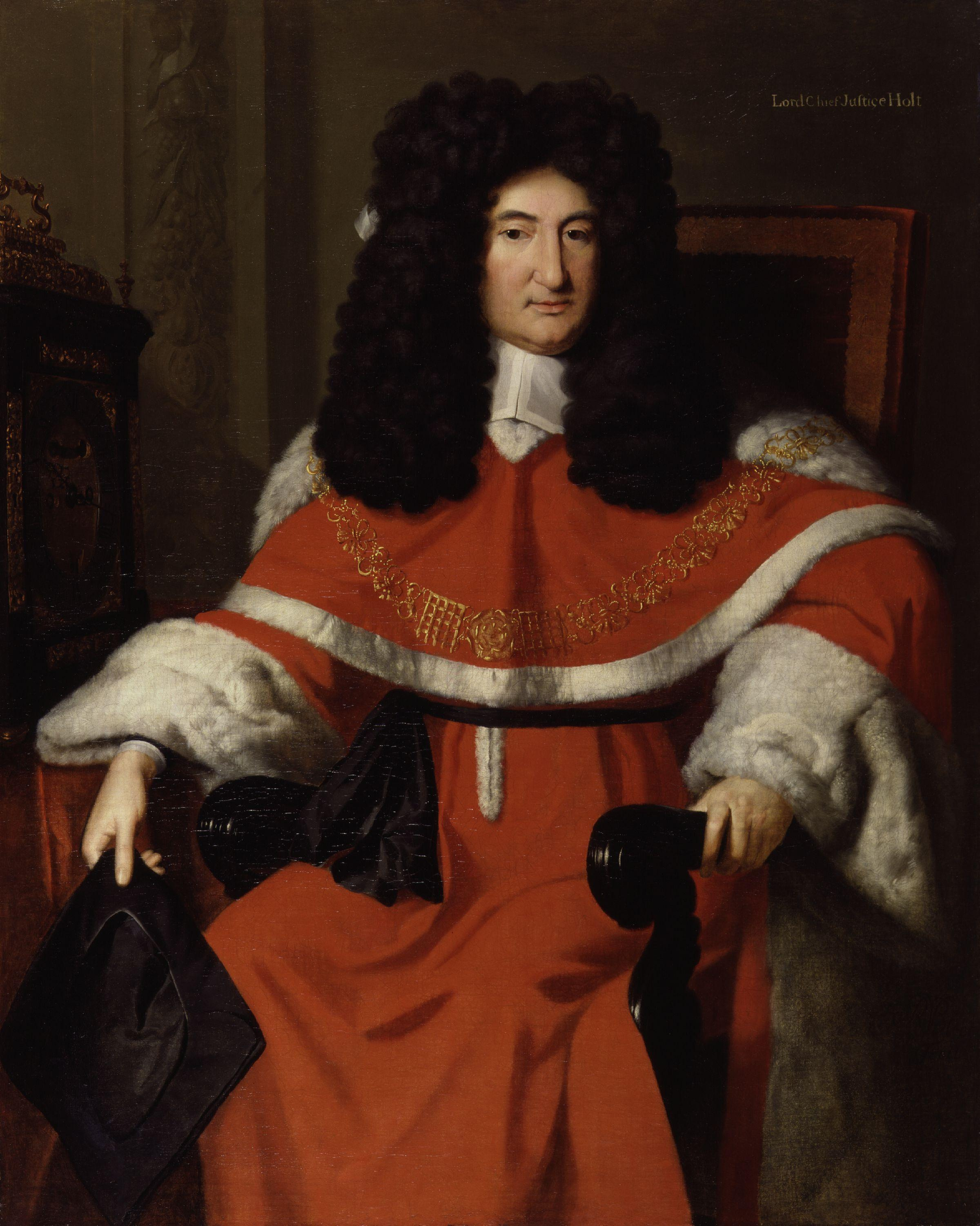
Lord Chief Justice of England Sir John Holt by Richard van Bleeck, c. 1700. Holt greatly influenced the end of prosecutions for witchcraft in England. National Portrait Gallery, London.

The last persons known to have been executed for witchcraft in England were the so-called Bideford witches in 1682. The last person executed for witchcraft in Great Britain was Janet Horne, in Scotland in 1727. The Witchcraft Act 1735 (9 Geo. 2 c. 5) abolished the penalty of execution for witchcraft, replacing it with imprisonment. This act was repealed by the Fraudulent Mediums Act 1951 (14 & 15 Geo. 6. c. 33).

Enlightenment attitudes after 1700 made a mockery of beliefs in witches. The Witchcraft Act 1735 (9 Geo. 2 c. 5) marked a complete reversal in attitudes. Penalties for the practice of witchcraft as traditionally constituted, which by that time was considered by many influential figures to be an impossible crime, were replaced by penalties for the pretence of witchcraft. A person who claimed to have the power to call up spirits, or foretell the future, or cast spells, or discover the whereabouts of stolen goods, was to be punished as a vagrant and a con artist, subject to fines and imprisonment.

In the north of England, the superstition lingers to an almost inconceivable extent. Lancashire abounds with witch-doctors, a set of quacks, who pretend to cure diseases inflicted by the devil ... The witch-doctor alluded to is better known by the name of the cunning man, and has a large practice in the counties of Lincoln and Nottingham.

Historians Keith Thomas and his student Alan Macfarlane study witchcraft by combining historical research with concepts drawn from anthropology. They argued that English witchcraft, like African witchcraft, was endemic rather than epidemic. Old women were the favorite targets because they were marginal, dependent members of the community and therefore more likely to arouse feelings of both hostility and guilt, and less likely to have defenders of importance inside the community. Witchcraft accusations were the village's reaction to the breakdown of its internal community, coupled with the emergence of a newer set of values that was generating psychic stress.

==== In Italy ====
A particularly rich source of information about witchcraft in Italy before the outbreak of the Great Witch Hunts of the Renaissance are the sermons of Franciscan popular preacher, Bernardino of Siena (1380–1444), who saw the issue as one of the most pressing moral and social challenges of his day and thus preached many a sermon on the subject, inspiring many local governments to take actions against what he called "servants of the Devil". As in most European countries, women in Italy were more likely suspected of witchcraft than men. Women were considered dangerous due to their supposed sexual instability, such as when being aroused, and also due to the powers of their menstrual blood.

In the 16th century, Italy had a high portion of witchcraft trials involving love magic. The country had a large number of unmarried people due to men marrying later in their lives during this time. This left many women on a desperate quest for marriage leaving them vulnerable to the accusation of witchcraft whether they took part in it or not. Trial records from the Inquisition and secular courts discovered a link between prostitutes and supernatural practices. Professional prostitutes were considered experts in love and therefore knew how to make love potions and cast love related spells. Up until 1630, the majority of women accused of witchcraft were prostitutes. A courtesan was questioned about her use of magic due to her relationship with men of power in Italy and her wealth. The majority of women accused were also considered "outsiders" because they were poor, had different religious practices, spoke a different language, or simply from a different city/town/region. Cassandra from Ferrara, Italy, was still considered a foreigner because not native to Rome where she was residing. She was also not seen as a model citizen because her husband was in Venice.

From the 16th to 18th centuries, the Catholic Church enforced moral discipline throughout Italy. With the help of local tribunals, such as in Venice, the two institutions investigated a woman's religious behaviors when she was accused of witchcraft.

==== In Spain ====
Galicia in Spain is nicknamed the "Land of the Witches" (Galician: Terra Meiga) due to its mythological origins surrounding its people, culture and its land. The Basque Country also suffered persecutions against witches, such as the case of the Witches of Zugarramurdi, six of which were burned in Logroño in 1610, or the witch hunt in the French Basque country in the previous year, burning eighty supposed witches at the stake. This is reflected in the studies of José Miguel de Barandiarán and Julio Caro Baroja. Euskal Herria retains numerous legends that account for an ancient mythology of witchcraft. The town of Zalla is nicknamed "Town of the Witches".

The oldest legal document recording a trial for alleged witchcraft in Spain dates back to 1419 against Sança de Camins in Barcelona, Catalonia.

==== In Eastern Europe ====
The Russian word ведьма (ved'ma) literally means 'knower', and was the primary word for a malevolent witch. The Ukrainian analogue of the same word is Відьма (vid'ma), and the engagement in witchcraft was historically known as відьомство (vid'omstvo). In Russia, three quarters of those accused of witchcraft were men. This starkly differed from the situation in Ukraine, where almost 80% of those accused of witchcraft were women.

In 17th-century Russia, the dominant societal concern about those practicing witchcraft was not whether it was effective, but whether it could cause harm. Peasants in Russian and Ukrainian societies often shunned witchcraft, unless they needed help against supernatural forces. Impotence, stomach pains, barrenness, hernias, abscesses, epileptic seizures, and convulsions were all attributed to evil (or witchcraft). This is reflected in linguistics; there are numerous words for a variety of practitioners of paganism-based healers. Russian peasants referred to a witch as a chernoknizhnik (a person who plied his trade with the aid of a black book), sheptun/sheptun'ia (a 'whisperer' male or female), lekar/lekarka or znakhar/znakharka (a male or female healer), or zagovornik (an incanter). In Ukrainian tradition witches were divided in two categories: "inborn" (родимі) and "educated" (вчені); the former were said to possess their knowledge of magic from birth and could be distinguished by the presence of certain deformities on their bodies, while the latter became witches consciously after undergoing a process of initiation.

There was universal reliance on folk healers—but clients often turned them in if something went wrong. According to Russian historian Valerie A. Kivelson, witchcraft accusations were normally thrown at lower-class peasants, townspeople and Cossacks. The ratio of male to female accusations was 75% to 25%. Males were targeted more, because witchcraft was associated with societal deviation. Because single people with no settled home could not be taxed, males typically had more power than women in their dissent. The history of witchcraft had evolved around society. More of a psychological concept to the creation and usage of witchcraft can create the assumption as to why women are more likely to follow the practices behind witchcraft. Identifying with the soul of an individual's self is often deemed as "feminine" in society. There is analyzed social and economic evidence to associate between witchcraft and women.

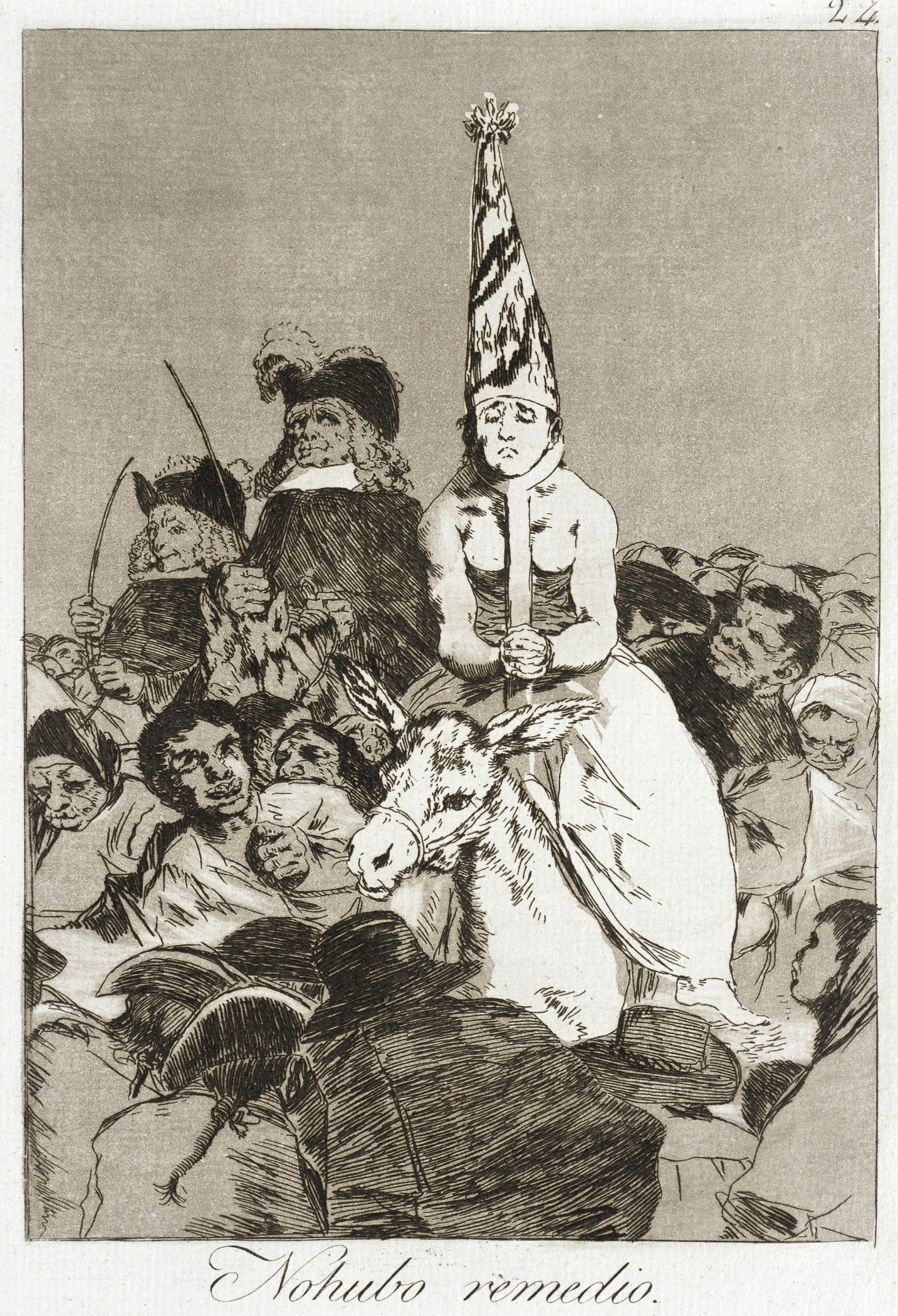
Goya's drawing of result of a presumed witch's trial: "[so she must be a witch]"

In the seventeenth century, Russia experienced a period of witchcraft trials and persecution that mirrored the witch hysteria occurring across Catholic and Protestant countries. Orthodox Christian Europe joined this phenomenon, targeting individuals, both male and female, believed to be practicing sorcery, paganism, and herbal medicine. Ecclesiastical jurisdiction over witchcraft trials was established in the church, with origins dating back to early references in historical documents, such as the eleventh-century State Statute of Vladimir the Great and the Primary Chronicle. The punishment for witchcraft typically included burning at the stake or the "ordeal of cold water," a method used both in Western Europe and Russia.

While Western Europe often employed harsh torture methods, Russia implemented a more civil system of fines for witchcraft during the seventeenth century. This approach contrasted with the West's cruelties and represented a significant difference in persecution methods. Ivan IV, or Ivan the Terrible, was deeply convinced that witchcraft led to the death of his wife, spurring him to excommunicate and impose the death penalty on those practicing witchcraft. This fear of witchcraft persisted during Ivan IV's rule, leading to the accusation of boyars with witchcraft during the Oprichnina period, followed by increased witchcraft concerns during the Time of Troubles. Following these periods of turmoil, witchcraft investigations became prevalent within Muscovite households. Between 1622 and 1700, numerous trials were conducted, though the scale of persecution and execution was not as extensive as in Western Europe. Russia's approach to witchcraft trials showcased its unique blend of religious and social factors, culminating in a distinct historical context compared to the widespread witch hysteria observed in other parts of Europe.

In Ukrainian lands under the rule of the Polish-Lithuanian Commonwealth an important source of law employed during witch trials were commentaries by Bartłomiej Groicki. Evidence of application of torture to suspected witches is contained in 17th and 18th-century records from Lviv, Kamianets-Podilskyi and Kremenets. However, only around 5% of accused were tortured, mostly due to the lack of hangmen and the generally milder character of judiciary in comparison to Western countries. Only a small part of accused were sentenced to death, and in more than half of cases the courts refused to investigate witchcraft accusations.

Ruthenians populating the modern territory of Ukraine were widely stereotyped by their Polish neighbours to engage in magic and witchcraft, but a similar reputation was also ascribed to Polish Catholics in Ukrainian Orthodox sources of the time. During the Khmelnytsky Uprising, defeats of the Polish army by Zaporozhian Cossacks were frequently ascribed to the employment of witchcraft by the latter. In Left-bank Ukraine, six women were burned in 1667 after being accused of employing magic against hetman Ivan Briukhovetsky and his wife Daria Dolgorukova, which supposedly resulted in a miscarriage.

Persecution of witches in Poland-Lithuania was officially stopped in 1776, one year after a ban on witch trials was introduced in the Russian Empire. Despite this, accusation of witchcraft continued to be present in Ukrainian court records into the 19th century.

=== 20th and 21st centuries ===
Modern witchcraft in Europe encompasses a diverse range of contemporary traditions. Some adherents practice what they believe are traditions rooted in ancient pagan and mystical practices, while others follow openly modern, syncretic traditions like Wicca. While adherents distinguish between Wicca and these other traditions, religious studies scholars class these various neopagan witchcraft traditions under the broad category of "Wicca."

These traditions emerged predominantly in the mid-20th century, inspired by a revival of interest in pre-Christian spirituality. Influenced by the now-discredited witch-cult hypothesis, which suggested persecuted witches in Europe were followers of a surviving pagan religion, these traditions seek to reconnect with ancient beliefs and rituals.

==== Britain ====
During the 20th century, interest in witchcraft rose in Britain. From the 1920s, Margaret Murray popularized the 'witch-cult hypothesis': the idea that those persecuted as 'witches' in early modern Europe were followers of a benevolent pagan religion that had survived the Christianization of Europe. This has been discredited by further historical research.

From the 1930s, occult neopagan groups began to emerge who called their religion a kind of 'witchcraft'. They were initiatory secret societies inspired by Murray's 'witch cult' theory and historical paganism. They did not use the term 'witchcraft' in the traditional way, but instead defined their practices as a kind of "positive magic". Among the most prominent of these traditions is Wicca, pioneered by Gerald Gardner in England during the mid-20th century. Gardnerian Wicca, the earliest known form, draws on elements of ceremonial magic, historical paganism, and witch cult theories.

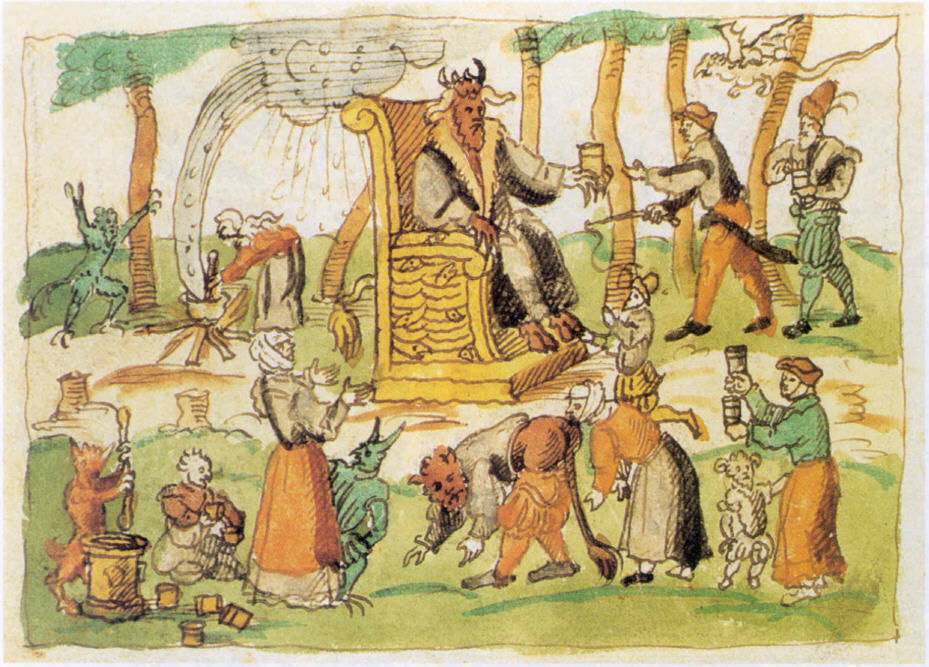
Representation of Sabbath gatherings from the chronicles of Johann Jakob Wick

Another notable tradition is Traditional Witchcraft, which stands apart from mainstream Wicca and emphasizes older, more "traditional" roots. This category includes Cochrane's Craft, founded by Robert Cochrane as a counterpoint to Gardnerian Wicca, and the Sabbatic Craft, as defined by Andrew Chumbley, which draws on a patchwork of ancient symbols and practices while emphasizing the imagery of the "Witches' Sabbath."

Throughout these traditions, practitioners may refer to themselves as witches and engage in rituals, magic, and spiritual practices that reflect their connection to nature, deity, and personal growth. These British-developed traditions have since been adopted and adapted outside of Britain.

==== Italy ====
Contemporary witchcraft in Italy represents a revival and reinterpretation of ancient pagan practices, often referred to as "Stregheria" or "La Vecchia Religione" (The Old Religion). Rooted in Italian cultural and mystical heritage, modern Italian witches blend elements of traditional folklore, spirituality, and magic. This resurgence draws from historical beliefs, superstitions, and the desire to reconnect with Italy's pre-Christian spiritual roots.

Streghe celebrate a diverse range of practices. They honor a pantheon of deities, often including a Moon Goddess and a Horned God, similar to some neopagan traditions. These deities are seen as sources of guidance, protection, and spiritual connection. Rituals and magic are integral to contemporary witchcraft in Italy, often involving the use of symbolic tools like the pentagram and the practice of divination. These practices aim to tap into the energies of nature and the cosmos, fostering personal growth and connection to the spiritual realm.

Contemporary Italian witchcraft is not monolithic, as individual practitioners may draw from various sources, adapt rituals to modern contexts, and blend traditional practices with modern influences. While some Streghe focus on healing, protection, and divination, others emphasize honoring ancestors and connecting with local spirits. The resurgence of Italian witchcraft reflects a broader global trend of seeking spiritual authenticity, cultural preservation, and a deeper connection to the mystical aspects of life.

==== Segnature ====
Recent academic scholarship has re-evaluated certain Italian folk healing traditions, particularly Segnature, as a form of indigenous European shamanism rather than merely superstitious or magical practice. Segnature involves ritual gestures, sacred prayers, and healing formulas passed down within families, traditionally performed by healers known as Segnatori. Dr Angela Puca, a scholar of esotericism and contemporary Paganism, has played a leading role in systematising Segnature as a coherent vernacular healing tradition. In her 2024 monograph Italian Witchcraft and Shamanism: The Tradition of Segnature (Brill), Puca analyzes the historical continuity, ritual structure, and syncretic nature of Segnature, situating it within both folk Catholic and animist frameworks. She argues for its recognition as a legitimate, context-specific form of shamanism grounded in Italy's rural and spiritual heritage. This view reflects a broader shift in scholarship that frames vernacular magic not merely as superstition but as culturally embedded religious practice.

==== Romania and the Roma ====
Roma witchcraft stands as a distinctive and culturally significant tradition within the Roma community, weaving together spirituality, healing practices, and fortune-telling abilities passed down through generations of Roma women. Rooted in history and mythology, this practice bears witness to the matrilineal nature of Roma culture, where women are the bearers of these ancient arts.

Unlike the severe witchcraft trials that plagued Western Europe, witchcraft historically took on a different form in Romania. The Romanian Orthodox Church's integration of pre-Christian beliefs and the reliance on village healers in the absence of modern medicine led to a less punitive approach. Instead of harsh punishments, those accused of witchcraft often faced spiritual consequences, such as fasting or temporary bans from the church.

Figures like Maria Campina, revered as the "Queen of Witches", exemplify the prominence of Roma witches in contemporary Romania. Campina's claims of inheriting her powers from her ancestors and her expertise in fortune-telling have earned her respect within both the Roma community and wider society.

Mihaela Drăgan, an influential Roma actress and writer, challenges stereotypes and empowers Roma women through her concept of "Roma Futurism". This visionary movement envisions a future where Roma witches embrace modernity while preserving their cultural heritage. Social media platforms have enabled Roma witches to amplify their reach, reshaping their image and expanding their influence.

==== Other countries ====
Hexentum is the German term for witchcraft. These practitioners engage in folk magic, spellwork, and other witchcraft practices. Sorcellerie refers to witchcraft practices in France, often rooted in traditional folk magic, spellcasting, and working with natural elements. Wróżbiarstwo is the Polish term for divination and witchcraft. It involves practices like fortune-telling, spellcasting, and working with herbs and charms. Brujería refers to witchcraft in Spain. Modern practitioners engage in spellwork, ritual magic, and working with herbs and crystals. Noita refers to Finnish folk magic, which involves practices such as healing, protection, and divination. It draws from local traditions and folklore. Various forms of folk magic and witchcraft practices are present in Eastern European countries, often involving rituals, spells, and working with charms and herbs.

== Academic views ==
=== Witch-cult hypothesis ===
The witch-cult theory was pioneered by two German scholars, Karl Ernst Jarcke and Franz Josef Mone, in the early nineteenth century, and was adopted by French historian Jules Michelet, American feminist Matilda Joslyn Gage, and American folklorist Charles Leland later that century. The hypothesis received its most prominent exposition when it was adopted by a British Egyptologist, Margaret Murray, who presented her version of it in The Witch-Cult in Western Europe (1921), before further expounding it in books such as The God of the Witches (1931) and her contribution to the Encyclopædia Britannica. Although the "Murrayite theory" proved popular among sectors of academia and the general public in the early and mid-twentieth century, it was never accepted by specialists in the witch trials, who publicly disproved it through in-depth research during the 1960s and 1970s.

Experts in European witchcraft beliefs view the pagan witch cult theory as pseudohistorical. There is now an academic consensus that those accused and executed as witches were not followers of any witch religion, pagan or otherwise. Critics highlight several flaws with the theory. It rested on highly selective use of evidence from the trials, thereby heavily misrepresenting the events and the actions of both the accused and their accusers. It also mistakenly assumed that claims made by accused witches were truthful, and not distorted by coercion and torture. Further, despite claims the witch cult was a pre-Christian survival, there is no evidence of such a pagan witch cult throughout the Middle Ages.

The witch-cult hypothesis has influenced literature, being adapted into fiction in works by John Buchan, Robert Graves, and others. It greatly influenced Wicca, a new religious movement of modern Paganism that emerged in mid-twentieth-century Britain and claimed to be a survival of the pagan witch cult. Since the 1960s, Carlo Ginzburg and other scholars have argued that surviving elements of pre-Christian religion in European folk culture influenced Early Modern stereotypes of witchcraft, but scholars still debate how this may relate, if at all, to the Murrayite witch-cult hypothesis.

=== Categorization of Wicca ===
Scholars of religious studies classify Wicca as a new religious movement, and more specifically as a form of modern Paganism. Wicca has been cited as the largest, best known, most influential, and most academically studied form of modern Paganism. Within the movement it has been identified as sitting on the eclectic end of the eclectic to reconstructionist spectrum. Several academics have also categorised Wicca as a form of nature religion, a term that is also embraced by many of its practitioners, and as a mystery religion. However, given that Wicca also incorporates the practice of magic, several scholars have referred to it as a "magico-religion". Wicca is also a form of Western esotericism, and more specifically a part of the esoteric current known as occultism. Academics like Wouter Hanegraaff and Tanya Luhrmann have categorised Wicca as part of the New Age, although other academics, and many Wiccans themselves, dispute this categorisation.

=== Use of hallucinogens ===
The use of hallucinogens in European witchcraft is a topic explored by modern researchers and historical records. Anthropologists such as Edward B. Taylor and pharmacologists like Louis Lewin have argued for the presence of plants like belladonna and mandrake in witchcraft practices, containing hallucinogenic alkaloids. Johannes Hartlieb (1410-1468) wrote a compendium on herbs in ca. 1440, and in 1456 the puch aller verpoten kunst, ungelaubens und der zaubrey (book on all forbidden arts, superstition and sorcery) on the artes magicae, containing the oldest known description of witches' flying ointment. Medieval accounts from writers including Joseph Glanvill and Johannes Nider describe the use of hallucinogenic concoctions, often referred to as ointments or brews, applied to sensitive areas of the body or objects like brooms for inducing altered states of consciousness. These substances were believed to grant witches special abilities to commune with spirits, transform into animals, and participate in supernatural gatherings, forming a complex aspect of the European witchcraft tradition.

==== Arguments in favor ====
A number of modern researchers have argued for the existence of hallucinogenic plants in the practice of European witchcraft; among them, anthropologists Edward B. Taylor, Bernard Barnett, Michael J. Harner and Julio C. Baroja and pharmacologists Louis Lewin and Erich Hesse. Many medieval writers also comment on the use of hallucinogenic plants in witches' ointments, including Joseph Glanvill, Jordanes de Bergamo, Sieur de Beauvoys de Chauvincourt, Martin Delrio, Raphael Holinshed, Andrés Laguna, Johannes Nider, Sieur Jean de Nynald, Henry Boguet, Giovanni Porta, Nicholas Rémy, Bartolommeo Spina, Richard Verstegan, Johann Vincent and Pedro Ciruelo.

Much of the knowledge of herbalism in European witchcraft comes from the Spanish Inquisitors and other authorities, who occasionally recognized the psychological nature of the "witches' flight", but more often considered the effects of witches' ointments to be demonic or satanic.

==== Use patterns ====
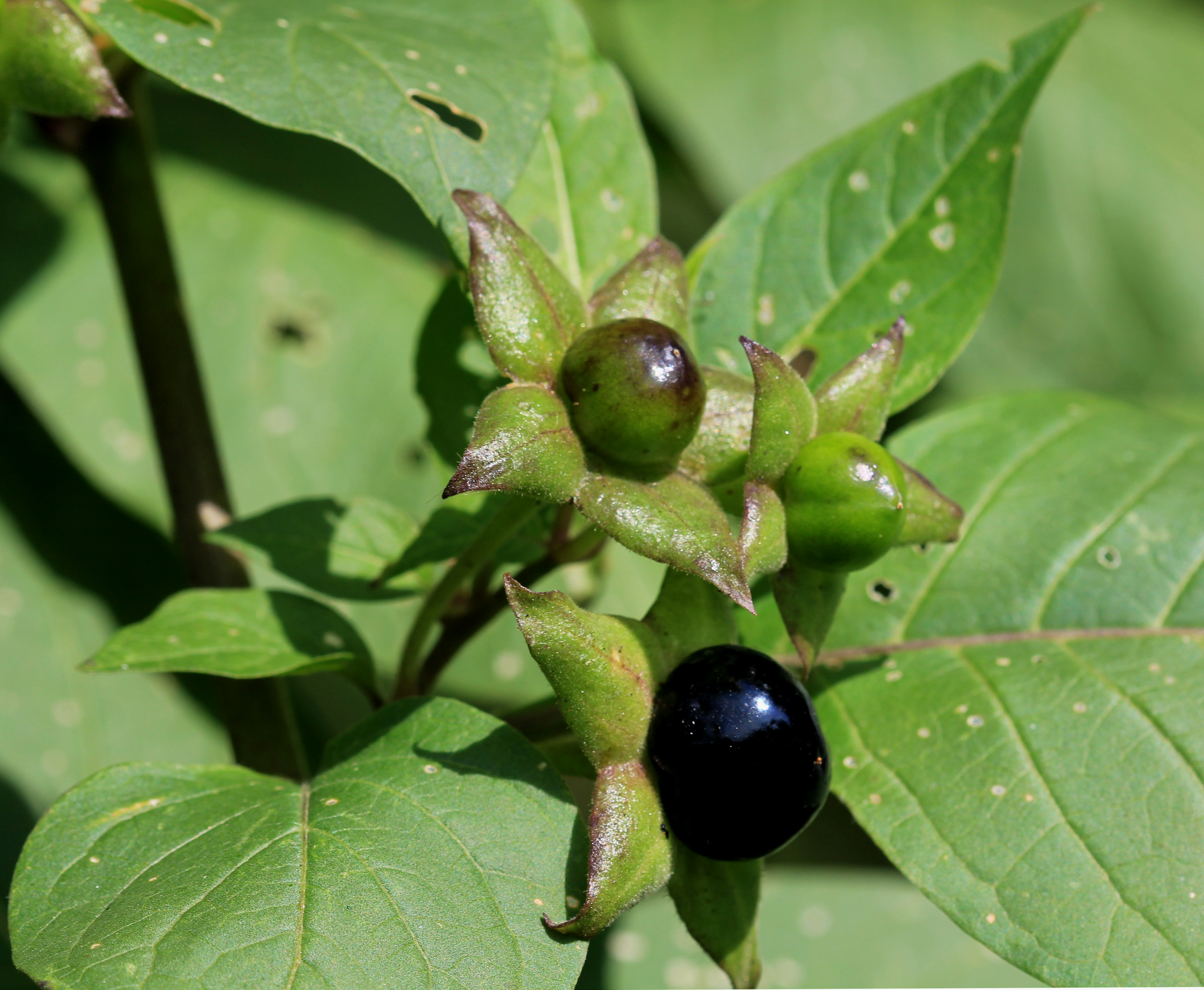
Berries of belladonna

Decoctions of deliriant nightshades (such as henbane, belladonna, mandrake, or datura) were used in European witchcraft. All of these plants contain hallucinogenic alkaloids of the tropane family, including hyoscyamine, atropine and scopolamine — the last of which is unique in that it can be absorbed through the skin. These concoctions are described in the literature variously as brews, salves, ointments, philtres, oils, and unguents. Ointments were mainly applied by rubbing on the skin, especially in sensitive areas—underarms, the pubic region, the mucous membranes of the vagina and anus, or on areas rubbed raw ahead of time. They were often first applied to a "vehicle" to be "ridden" (an object such as a broom, pitchfork, basket, or animal skin that was rubbed against sensitive skin). All of these concoctions were made and used for the purpose of giving the witch special abilities to commune with spirits, gain love, harm enemies, experience euphoria and sexual pleasure, and—importantly—to "fly to the witches' Sabbath".

== In art and literature ==
Witches have a long history of being depicted in art, although most of their earliest artistic depictions seem to originate in Early Modern Europe, particularly the Medieval and Renaissance periods. Many scholars attribute their manifestation in art as inspired by texts such as Canon Episcopi, a demonology-centered work of literature, and Malleus Maleficarum, a "witch-craze" manual published in 1487, by Heinrich Kramer and Jacob Sprenger. Witches in fiction span a wide array of characterizations. They are typically, but not always, female, and generally depicted as either villains or heroines.

== See also ==
- Brethren of the Free Spirit – Late Medieval European religious movement
- History of women in the United Kingdom § Witchcraft
- Wiccan organisation – Groups formed by Wiccans
- Witches of Benevento – Medieval legend
