= Terrassa witch trials =

Spanish witch trials (1615–1619)

The Terrassa witch trials took place in Terrassa, then in the Principality of Catalonia, Spain between 1615 and 1619. Six women of the city of Terrassa were accused of witchcraft and sentenced to death on 27 October 1619.

== Context ==
During the year preceding the witch trials, the area had suffered a complicated social situation with deep divisions between the rich and poor and many economic problems. The Church had evolved ideologically and no longer considered supernatural phenomena as the work of heretics. Consequently, extreme climatic conditions, such as droughts and frost or the death of animals and children were often attributed to the work of witches.

Spain had relatively few witch trials compared to other areas in Europe, since the Spanish Inquisition had issued mild guidelines in cases of witchcraft after the Navarre witch trials (1525-26), and the Terrassa witch trials took place during the period of the most intense witch panic, in 1618–1622, after which the witch trials in Spain nearly disappeared.

Despite this, many citizens of the town of Terrassa were upset as they believed that they were surrounded by witches. According to local legends, groups of women met with the devil, supposedly dancing frantic dances, losing control of themselves and surrendering themselves to the devil. Some historians have commented that these meetings of women, if they occurred, could have had a practical component, such as discussion and resolution of domestic problems or health issues. At the time, problems related to sexuality or female health had been marginalised by exclusively male practitioners of 'official' medicine.

== Trials ==
In this historical climate, Joana Ferré was accused of witchcraft in Terrassa in 1615 together with ten other women.

=== First trial ===
On 2 July 1615, the Holy Office of Barcelona asked the local authorities to transfer the accused women to the Catalan capital. Out of the 11 accused women, only three were incarcerated: Margarida Cotilla, Micaela Casanovas (known as Esclopera) and Guillermina Font (known as Miramunda). The others were released to return to Terrassa or flee to other cities. Those that returned to Terrassa continued to be suspected of witchcraft and were persecuted, publicly stoned or accused of prostitution.

=== Second trial ===
Given the climate of hysteria in the town, on 26 December 1618, the officials of the town of Terrassa invited the Witch Hunter Joan Font from Sellent, agreeing to pay his expenses from the public purse. With his help, they formed a civil tribunal on 23 May 1619 that consisted of the Mayor and his advisors. They detained and condemned six women, some of which had already been released by the Inquisition a few years before. Their names were Margarida Cotilla, Joana de Toy, Joana Sabina, Micaela Casanovas, Eulàlia Totxa and Guillermina Font (known as Miramunda).

=== Accusations ===
The accusations against the women were surprising. In one, Margarida Tafanera was accused by her own brother of bewitching his wife so that they couldn't have children and so she, Margarida, would inherit all his assets. In another, a neighbour, Antoni Ubres, stated that the women met on Thursday nights in an area called "la cuadra d’en Palet" where they waited for the devil, who appeared in a chair wearing a red. When he appeared, the neighbour said that the women kissed his hand. After the devil served a sinister dinner, he played the flute and fell into a scandalous orgy with the women.

The women were also accused of sacrificing animals, bewitching people, murder and many other misdeeds.

Joan Font, the witch hunter of Sallent testified to the Mayor and his advisors that after washing the backs of Joana Toy and Margarida Tafanera with holy water, he found the sign that the Devil used to mark his witches. Margarida Tafanera confessed to being a witch (probably under torture). She named a French women, called Joana Ferres as their witchcraft teacher and said that they met frequently in the house of Joana Toy. She also explained that they scrubbed their armpits, and other parts of the body and flew through the air to meet under a pine tree, with a demon who appeared as a very handsome young man wearing red clothes. The demon played the Flabiol and usually the meeting ended in an orgy.

Under interrogation, Joana Toy confessed that she was French and that she was the sister of Joan de la Boqueria. However initially she denied that she was a witch or that she knew the rest of the accused women. After torture, Joana confirmed the accusations against Margarida Tafanera and added that a French woman called Perona, who lived in Martorell, taught her the skills of witchcraft.

Margarida Tafanera denied all of the accusations, for which she suffered torture. Despite torture, she said she didn't know anything about what she was accused. During the second extortion of the judge, she said "kill me, so that you will have to give an account to God".

=== Incarceration and execution ===
The accused were incarcerated in the castle of Terrassa and tortured. As it was impossible for the Inquisition to convene a retrial, the women were kept in the 'Torre del Palacio' or Palace Tower until a civil trial was convened. Once convicted, their sentence was read out publicly and five of the women were hanged in the area 'Pedra Blanca' near to a present-day railway bridge, on 27 October 1619. The women hanged were Margarida Tafanera, Eulalia Totxa, Joana Sabina, Guillermina Font (known as Miramunda) and Miquela Casanovas (known as Esclopera). However, to this day, it is not known what happened to Joana Toy.

== In popular culture ==
In 2015, a found footage film entitled The Last Witch showcased three filmmakers tracking down the story of Joana Toy, a sixth accused woman who disappeared prior to the executions. Toy had confessed to witchcraft while being tortured.

The witch trials were dramatized by Francesc Maspons Labrós in the 1880 Catalan magazine 'Lo Gay Saber' with an article titled 'Las Bruixas'.
