= Maria Johan =

Spanish alleged witch

Maria Johan (died 1575) was a Spanish alleged witch.

Maria Johan was a poor peasant woman from the Anocibar in Navarre. In August 1575, the priest Pedro de Anocibar reported her to the royal legal secular court for heresy, apostasy, witchcraft and pact with Satan. Pedro de Anocibar had interrogated her nephews, ten-year old Miguel de Olagüe and eight-year-old Martin, who claimed that their aunt had taken them to a witches' sabbath. The boys also pointed out two other villagers, Miguel Zubiri and Maria Xandua, as accomplices.

Maria Johan stated that she had been tormented by evil spirits since the age of five and met the Devil when she was ten; she had suffered from fits, and been subjected to excorcism. However, she denied that she had taken her nephews to the witches' sabbath or used any evil magic.

The witch trial was handled by the royal (secular) legal court, and not by the Spanish Inquisition. The three adults were interrogated under torture in accordance with a questions from the contemporary demonological witchcraft ideology, and accused of having attended the Witches' Sabbath and then poisoned the harvests. Maria Johan confessed and confirmed her co-accused as her accomplices under torture. She was found guilty as charged and executed by being burned alive at the stake on the Plaza de la Taconera in Pamplona 25 October 1575, followed by Miguel Zubiri on 28 November 1575. Maria Xandua was however transferred from the secular authorities to the Inquisition on the request of her lawyer Pedro Larremendi, and acquitted of the charges.

The case of Maria Johan attracted great attention in Spain. It was the first witchcraft execution in Navarre since Navarre witch trials (1525–26) fifty years prior, and resulted in a witchcraft panic. After her execution, the authorities issued investigation of witchcraft in the villages of the region. This resulted in the Navarre witch trials (1575–76), where villagers, influenced by the Maria Johan-trial, reported suspicious people to the investigators. Over fifty people were accused between August 1575 and March 1576. However, there were no more death sentences after Maria Johan and Miguel Zubiri, since the Spanish Inquisition managed to take control over the witch trials and had a policy against executions; no more executions took place until the Basque witch trials in 1610.
