= Jerònima Muntanyola =

Spanish alleged witch

- Joana la Negra
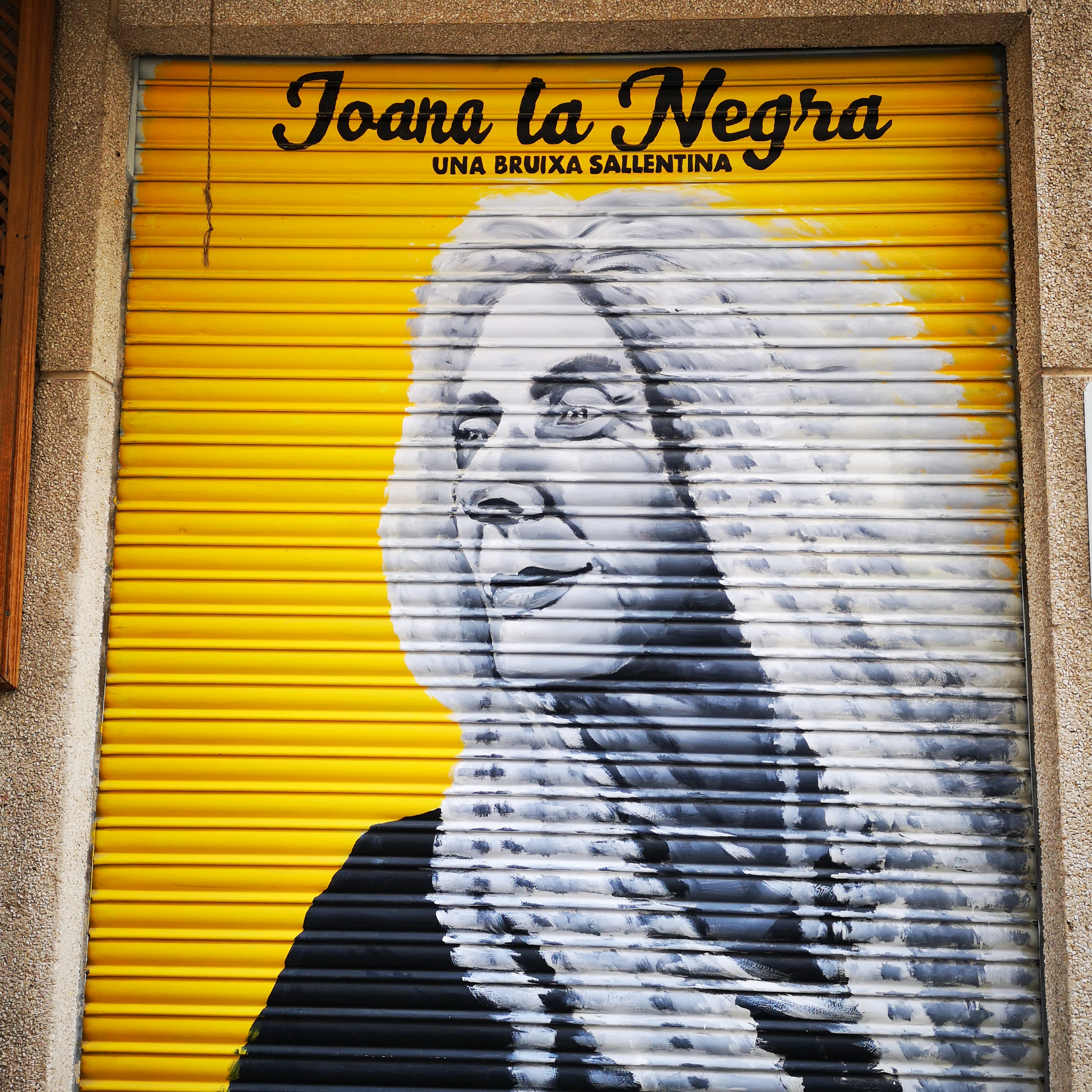
- Died: 30 October 1618; Sallent

Jerònima Muntanyola (died 1618), also known as Joana la Negra, was a Catalonian alleged witch.

== Life ==
She married Joanot Fumanya in her first marriage. She became a widow and remarried the day laborer Joan Pons of Sallent. She was active as a folk healer or cunning woman. Her mother had been a folk healer, and taught her the profession. She in turn instructed her daughter-in-law Felipa Esperança Gallifa to become a folk healer. She was acquitted from witchcraft in 1580.

In 1615–1630, a big witch hunt took place in Catalonia after a period of drought and flood, which had caused bad harvests and epidemics, disasters which was blamed on witches. She was a typical person to be accused in the hunt for scapegoats during the witch hunt, since she was a poor old woman active as a folk healer who had already once been accused of witchcraft and was a reputed witch.

Jerònima Muntanyola was charged with sorcery by the secular local court of Sallent 30 October 1618. She was accused of having been able to cure and thus also cause illness in humans; for having murdered two girls; for having caused hailstorms and having had intercourse with the Devil. She denied the charges until she was tortured. During torture, she confessed herself guilty to every crime she was accused of, and claimed she had been motivated by vengeance. She was sentenced by the secular court, and thus not burned at the stake, but executed by hanging.

== Legacy ==
A street in Sallent has been named after her. A sculpture as well as a wall painting has been made of her. A book has been written about her.
