= Witchcraft in ancient Greece and Rome =

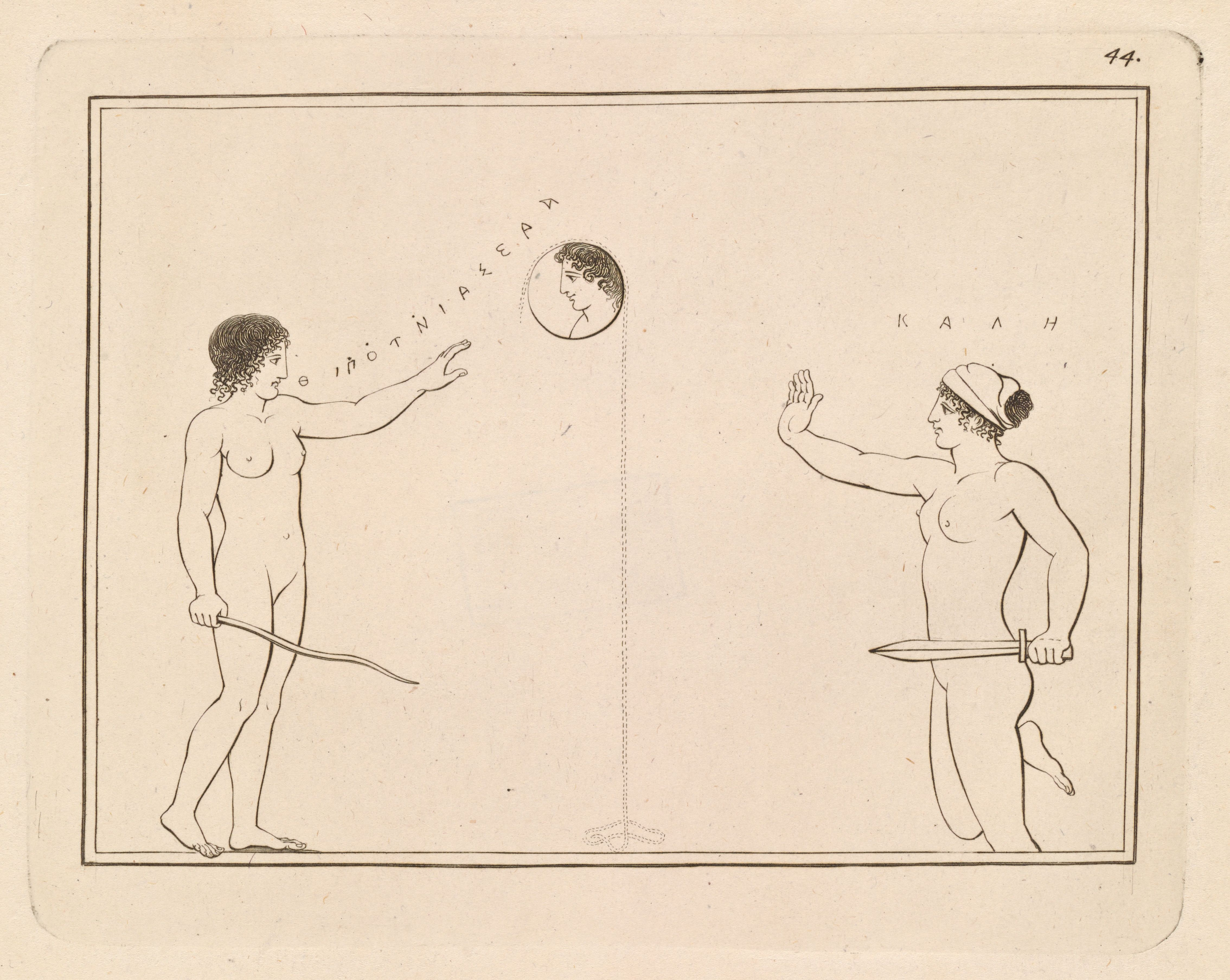
Greek vase painting Diana Taurica Hamilton collection.jpg

The earliest evidence of attitudes toward witchcraft in Europe can be traced back to ancient Greece. The concepts of witchcraft in both ancient Greece and Rome invite exploration, as they are intertwined with cultural identities, political dynamics, and gendered stereotypes. Those labeled as "witches" engaged with magic in ways that reflected broader societal norms and anxieties.

== Historical overview ==
Both ancient Greeks and Romans turned to magic to enhance their daily lives, especially when conventional solutions failed. In a society marked by complex and competitive erotic relationships, there is substantial evidence that both cultures envisioned and practiced magic to address their dilemmas. These ranged from simple physical desires to the intricate social dynamics underlying personal interactions, highlighting magic's pervasive role in navigating relationships.

From the 8th to the 5th century BCE, practitioners known as goêtes engaged in various forms of magic, including divination, spellcasting, and invoking supernatural entities. During this time, witches were often viewed as women wielding powerful potions, requiring extensive knowledge of herbs and rituals. Notably, there are no recorded condemnations of magic in Greek texts before 450 BCE.

Ionian Revolt Campaign Map

The condemnation of witches began in the 5th century BCE, influenced by several socio-political changes. The war with Persia prompted Greeks to define their identity against foreign influences, while city-states redefined citizenship and imperialism. The Ionian Revolt of 494 BCE, supported by Athens, intensified the struggle between Persian expansion and Athenian independence. Following their victory at Salamis in 479 BCE, a growing enthusiasm for democracy emerged, emphasizing rationality, social equality, and justice. This shift significantly shaped Athenian identity, leading to new legislation that scrutinized women's sexual chastity and the legitimacy of children. Edith Hall argues that a "discourse of barbarism" developed during this period, reflected in tragic literature and legitimizing imperial ideologies, with Persians symbolizing tyranny and chaos. Consequently, the discourse surrounding magic became intertwined with this narrative of barbarism, as noted by Kimberly B. Stratton.

In Rome, Greek literature's influence is evident in enduring figures like Circe and Medea, as well as in the creation of supernatural entities such as Lamia. While these narratives have roots in various cultures across Africa, Asia, and Europe, Rome's contributions helped integrate them into Western cultural traditions.

== Greek mythical witches ==
In Greek mythology, witches embody the complexities of magic and femininity. Notable figures include Circe and Medea, who have captivated audiences with their enchanting capabilities.

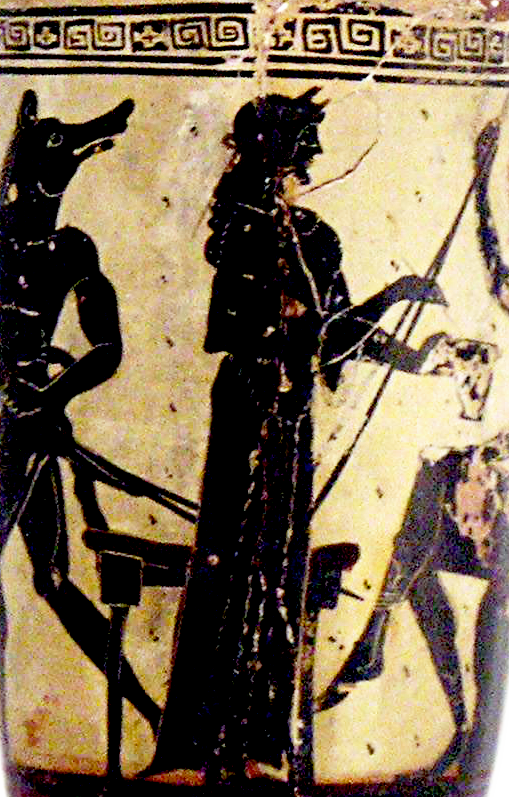
Circe

Circe is arguably the most renowned witch in Greek mythology. In Homer's Odyssey, she is depicted as a powerful sorceress, described as a "dread goddess of human speech" who can transform people into animals using her pharmaka. She also plays a vital role in teaching Odysseus how to summon the spirits of the Underworld.

Recent scholarly debates have questioned whether Circe should be classified as a witch. While traditionally seen as such, some scholars argue this interpretation misreads her role, suggesting instead that she is depicted as a goddess, aligning her with divine attributes found in other Homeric figures. This perspective challenges modern Western notions of witchcraft, which often carry gendered biases that do not accurately reflect the context of ancient Greece. Circe's lineage as the daughter of Helios and her powers akin to those of other deities emphasize her status as a goddess rather than merely a witch. Analyzing her actions—such as her use of potions and relationships with animals—indicates that these abilities are inherent to a divine being rather than practices of witchery. Thus, the classification of Circe as a witch may stem from a constructed narrative that oversimplifies and obscures a more nuanced understanding of female characters in ancient texts. Scholars advocate for a reevaluation of Circe's portrayal, emphasizing her recognition as a powerful goddess assessed within her cultural context rather than through contemporary moral standards.

Medea, Circe's niece, is renowned for her cunning and magical prowess. Her narrative intersects with that of Jason and the Argonauts, exploring themes of love, betrayal, and vengeance, highlighting her dual nature as both nurturing and formidable.

Another figure associated with witchcraft is Lamia, who embodies societal fears surrounding magic. Her character represents the darker aspects of witchcraft, emphasizing its potential consequences.

Together, these mythical witches provide rich narratives that explore the intersections of magic, gender, and divinity, prompting ongoing discussions about the portrayal of female figures in ancient mythology.

== Evidence of witchcraft in ancient Greece and Rome ==
=== Linguistic evidence ===
Language sheds light on beliefs surrounding magic in ancient Greece and Rome. Key terms include:

- Pharmaka: Drugs or potions used in magical practices, emphasizing herbal knowledge.
- Pharmakoi: Ritual scapegoats paraded in public before facing punishment, reflecting community efforts to eliminate malevolent influences.
- Magoi and Magi: Practitioners of magic often viewed with suspicion due to their foreign origins.
- Moyu and Magauno: Religious caste of the ancient Iranian Medes, as mentioned by Herodotus.
- Alazons and Agurtai: Obscure tribe on the northern shores of the Black Sea as used by Plato, associated with shamanistic practices in both Homer’s Iliad and by Herodotus.

=== Legal context and witch trials ===
Legal records offer crucial insights into how witchcraft was perceived and prosecuted in ancient Greece. A notable case is found in Antiphon’s Against the Stepmother (ca. 480–411 BCE), which centers on the deaths of two men, one being the prosecutor’s father, allegedly due to a love charm, or philtron, administered by a mistress.

In this case, the mistress, likely a slave, was encouraged by the stepmother to use the philtron to rekindle the affections of both men. After a dinner celebrating the rites of Zeus Ctesius, she slipped the potion into their wine, resulting in Philoneus's immediate death and the stepmother's husband falling ill and dying twenty days later.

The prosecution focused on the stepmother's intent; if intent to kill could be proven, the potion would be classified as poison; if not, it would be seen as merely a love charm. This distinction highlights the significance of intent in Athenian homicide law, as noted by Demosthenes.

The trial's outcome remains unknown but raises critical questions about the legal treatment of women and the nature of magical practices. The mistress faced execution for administering the potion, while the stepmother was scrutinized for her involvement, exemplifying the complexities of witchcraft accusations, especially regarding women's agency and societal norms.

Similar cases persisted into the second century CE, illustrating women's use of love potions to influence powerful men. The story of Deianeira and Herakles further exemplifies the tragic consequences of such charms. However, the limited availability of surviving legal records complicates our understanding of how laws against witchcraft were enforced.

=== Archaeological Evidence ===
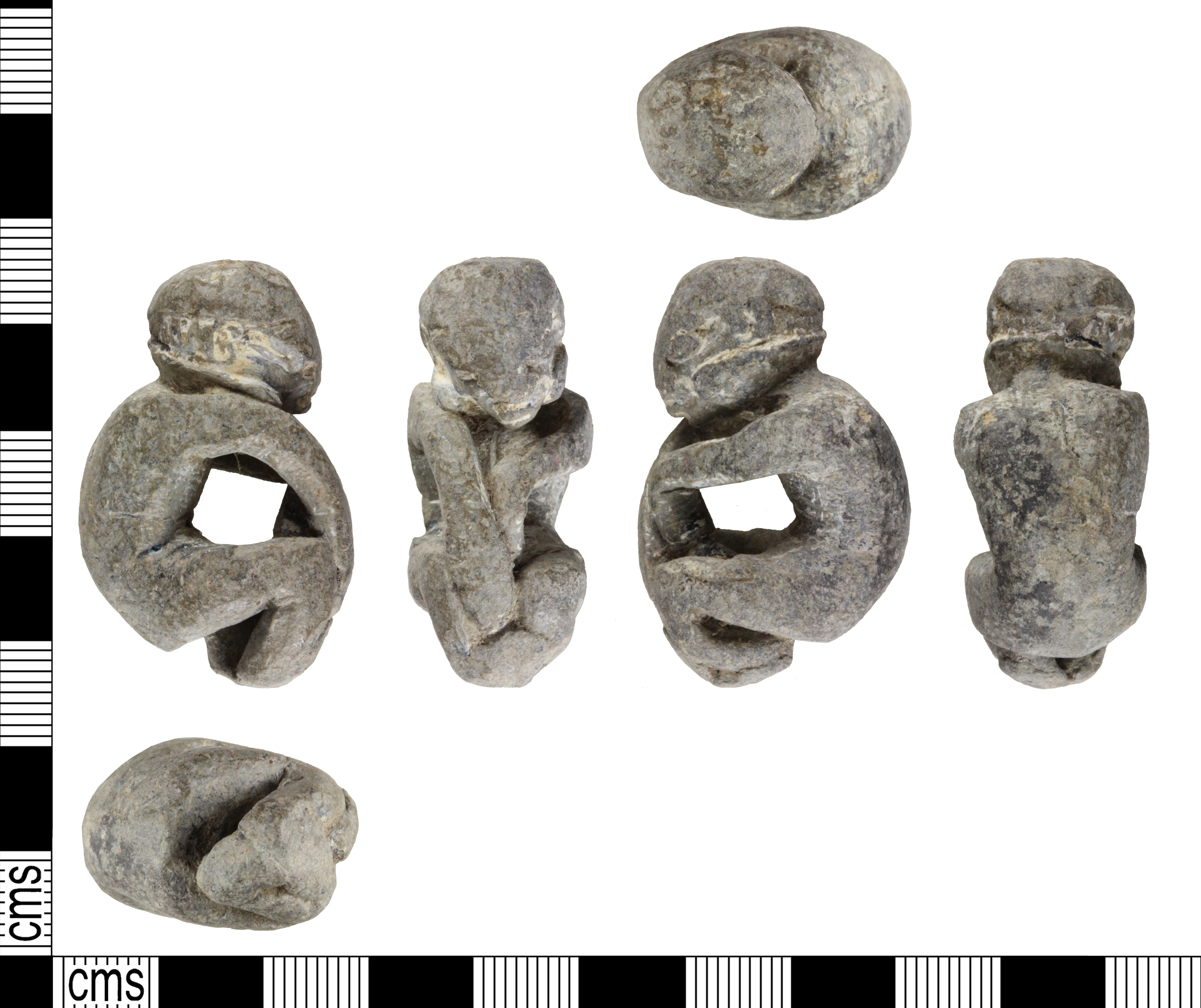

Archaeological findings significantly enhance our understanding of witchcraft practices in ancient Greece and Rome. A prominent form of magic was katadesmoi, which involved binding spells executed with images or proxies, typically inscribed on lead tablets.

Curse tablets, or defixiones, were central to these magical practices. Made of lead and inscribed with curses or spells, these artifacts were intended to harm or bind individuals, reflecting personal grievances and communal dynamics. They illustrate how magic was employed for vengeance or manipulation. Lead curse tablets often articulated the desperate wishes of individuals seeking to influence personal rivalries or romantic situations. Rather than mere prayers, these inscriptions indicated active engagement in magical rituals aimed at effecting change, detailing the names of victims and specific desired outcomes to demonstrate the practitioner's intent.

In addition to curse tablets, other magical materials included intricately engraved gems and amulets that symbolized desired results, often featuring inscriptions invoking particular deities to enhance the spells' efficacy. Professional experts compiled elaborate formulas of magical recipes, further legitimizing these practices. Bound lead figurines found at sites like Tell Sandahannah frequently depicted sexual features, potentially embodying desires or curses. Together with the curse tablets, they suggest that professional magoi kept ready-made tablets and figurines for customers, indicating a market for magical services.

The use of katadesmoi rituals—featuring lead tablets inscribed with victim names and placed in liminal spaces—highlights the cultural significance of magic in ancient societies. Rooted in Mesopotamian practices, these curse tablets enabled individuals to express frustrations and seek retribution, reflecting societal norms regarding conflict resolution and personal agency. By inscribing curses, practitioners demonstrated a belief in the power of words and symbols to influence reality, revealing the complex interplay between personal desires and communal beliefs.

Overall, evidence from linguistic, legal, and archaeological sources underscores the multifaceted nature of witchcraft, illustrating how ancient societies perceived and practiced magic while addressing cultural anxieties surrounding power and control.
