= Navarre witch trials (1525–1526) =

The Navarre witch trials took place in the Pyrenees in the Kingdom of Navarre in 1525–1526. It was a significant event in the treatment of witchcraft cases in Spain, as it led to a decision from the Spanish Inquisition in how to conduct witch trials. The commissioner brought along "two girl witches, who know how to discover witches", two sisters of nine and eleven years old. During the inspection tour of the commissioner, the two girls inspected the villagers for signs of the "Devil's mark" in their eyes.

== Trials ==
In 1525, the Council of Navarre sent a special commissioner to inspect the mountain regions of the Navarrese North Eastern Pyrenees, "where for a long time they had not known what temporal or spiritual justice means". The commissioner brought along "two girl witches, who know how to discover witches", two sisters of nine and eleven years old. During the inspection tour of the commissioner, the two girls inspected the villagers for signs of the "Devil's mark" in their eyes.

This led to a number of witch trials. The commissioner arrested and executed an unknown number of people for witchcraft in five different places. He purchased masses for the confiscated property of the condemned to ask the blessing of God for his mission.

The Navarrese witch hunt, however, provoked intervention by the Supreme Council of the Spanish Inquisition. In August 1525, the Inquisition was granted jurisdiction over the witch hunt, and 30 people accused of witchcraft were handed over to them. They also insisted on inspecting the ongoing witch trials.

In December 1525, the Spanish Inquisition issued guidelines in how to deal with witch trials. The guidelines cautioned skepticism against spells, which caused most accusations and death sentences, banned the confiscation of the property of anyone condemned for witchcraft, reserved for the Inquisition the right to try witches, and paid more attention to "re-educating" witches rather than issuing death sentences.

== Aftermath ==
The guideline to "re-educate" rather than execute witches were followed by the Spanish Inquisition in witchcraft cases from 1526 until the Basque witch trials in 1609; during that time, many people were executed by the Inquisition in Spain, especially in Navarre, but for heresy and not for witchcraft. In 1527, led by the inquisitor Avellaneda, acting on the same valleys the Navarrese Royal Council deputy had punished in 1525 (Salazar, Erronkari), resulting in approximately 80 residents burnt on fire for heresy.

However, witchcraft executions were rare, and it was to be fifty years until another took place. In 1575, the secular courts executed Maria Johan for witchcraft, resulting in the Navarre witch trials (1575–76) with fifty accused witches, a witch hunt which the Inquisition however succeeded in stopping without further executions. It was not until the Basque witch trials in 1609 that the Inquisition again allowed for witchcraft executions, and it was also to be the last.

The Spanish Inquisition did not always succeed in keeping the secular courts from dealing with witchcraft cases, and a failure to do so resulted in a great witch hunt in Catalonia in 1618-1622, with about one hundred victims until it was subdued. After 1622, witch trials in Spain dwindled until the mid-17th century.

== See also ==
- Spanish conquest of Iberian Navarre
