= Sança de Camins =

Catalan midwife and accused witch (15th century)

Sança (or Sancha) de Camins (15th century) was a Catalan midwife and accused witch. Her trial on charges of witchcraft in 1419 is the first documented case in Catalonia and one of the first in the Iberian Peninsula and Europe, as well as the first in which the word bruixa ("witch" in Catalan) appears in judicial documents and, therefore, in which witchcraft goes from being a superstition to a crime.

== Trial ==
Sança was a midwife, probably in Barcelona. In 1419, she was tried by the Episcopal Court of Barcelona for her involvement in an infanticide.

According to the fragment De bruixes preserved in the Diocesan Archives of the Archdiocese of Barcelona, the trial began with the court questioning her about her possible connection to witches, whether she knew people involved in witchcraft, and whether she could identify the marks of witchcraft on the bodies of the deceased infants. Sança admitted to the mother of the deceased infant that she had recognised the marks on his body as having been made by witches. However, she denied the charges against her, although she admitted to having performed magic ritual with other women to protect infants from witches and other evils beings. Sança narrated one of the ritual she performed during a childbirth, consisting in a tablecloth placed on a table with bread, wine and water and, in front of a mirror, make gestures invoking "Trip", probably the pagan goddess of the Moon Triple.

The sentence handed down to Sança de Camins is unknown, but the documentation does not mention charges of heresy or demonolatry, nor does it mention any renunciation of the faith, which suggests that her punishment, if she was not acquitted, must have been lenient.

Her case is the first documented case in Catalonia as well as the first in which the word bruixa ("witch" in Catalan) appears in judicial documents.
