= María Pujol =

Spanish alleged witch

Maria Pujol (died 8 January 1767), also known as La Napa, was a Spanish alleged witch. She was the last person to be executed for witchcraft in Catalonia and any other region of Spain.

== Life ==
She was a poor woman residing in Prats de Llusanés, accused by her neighbors of robbing orchards and farms for food.

In 1766, the body of a murdered four-year-old girl was found, and her neighbors accused her of having murdered the girl to use her body parts to manufacture magical potions.

She was charged with sorcery in Barcelona. This was a century after the witch trials of Spain had died out. She was sentenced as guilty by a secular court to hanging for witchcraft. Her execution took place on 8 January 1767.

== Legacy ==
Known as the last person to be executed for witchcraft in Spain, she is the subject of local folklore and legend in Catalonia.
