= Messianism =

Belief in the advent of a messiah

Messianism is the belief in the advent of a messiah who acts as the savior of a group of people. Some religions also have messianism-related concepts. Religions with a messiah concept include Christianity (Jesus), Hinduism (Kalki), Judaism (Mashiach), Islam (Isa), Druze faith (Hamza ibn Ali), Zoroastrianism (Saoshyant), Buddhism (Maitreya), Taoism (Li Hong), and Bábism (He whom God shall make manifest).

In Judaism, the messiah will be a future Jewish king from the line of David and redeemer of the Jewish people and humanity. In Christianity, Jesus is the messiah, (Note: Christ, pronounced /kraɪst/ From Latin: Christus, via Greek: χριστός, romanized: khristós, lit. 'the anointed one [of God]'; calqued from Hebrew: מָשִׁיחַ, romanized: māšîaḥ, lit. 'messiah or messias'. Alternatively (Messiah or Messias): Latin: messias, from Greek: μεσσίας, romanized: messías, lit. 'messias or messiah' (alternative to χριστός), via Imperial Aramaic: משיחא, romanized: məšīḥā, ultimately from the same Hebrew.) the savior, the redeemer, and God. In Islam, Jesus was a prophet and the messiah of the Jewish people who will return in the end times.

== Abrahamic religions ==
=== Judaism ===
Messiah (Hebrew: משיח; mashiah, moshiah, mashiach, or moshiach, ("anointed [one]") is a term used in the Hebrew Bible to describe priests and kings, who were traditionally anointed. For example, Cyrus the Great, the King of Persia, is referred to as "God's anointed" (Messiah) in the Bible.

In Jewish messianic tradition and eschatology, the term came to refer to a future Jewish king from the Davidic line, who will be "anointed" with holy anointing oil and rule the Jewish people during the Messianic Age. In Standard Hebrew, the messiah is often referred to as Melekh ha-Mashiaḥ (מלך המשיח), literally "the Anointed King".

Rabbinic Judaism and current Orthodox Judaism hold that the messiah will be an anointed one, descended from his father through the Davidic line of King David, who will gather the Jews back into the Land of Israel and usher in an era of peace.

Following the Expulsion of Jews from Spain in 1492 many Spanish rabbis, such as Abraham ben Eliezer Halevi, believed that the year 1524 would be the beginning of the Messianic Age and that the Messiah himself would appear in 1530–31.

Orthodox Jewish messianic movements have occasionally emerged throughout the centuries among Jewish communities worldwide. These surround various messiah claimants. However, from the Jewish view, the claimants failed to deliver the promises of redemption, and generally remained with only a handful of followers. Excepting Jesus, the most popular messiah claimants were Simon bar Kokhba in 2nd century Judea, Nehemiah ben Hushiel in the 7th century Sasanian Empire, Sabbatai Zevi in the 17th century Ottoman Empire (precursor to Sabbateans), Jacob Frank in 18th century Europe, Shukr Kuhayl I and Judah ben Shalom in 19th century Ottoman Yemen. There are those who currently identify the 20th century Menachem Mendel Schneerson (the Lubavitcher Rebbe) as the Mashiach.

Other denominations, such as Reform Judaism, believe in a Messianic Age when the world will be at peace, but do not agree that there will be a messiah as the leader of this era.

=== Christianity ===
In Christianity, the Messiah is called the Christ (/kraɪst/; Greek: Χριστός, romanized: Khristós, lit. 'Anointed One'; Hebrew: מָשִׁיחַ, romanized: Māšîah, lit. 'Mashiach'), the saviour and redeemer who would bring salvation to the Jewish people and mankind. "Christ" is the Greek translation of "Messiah", meaning "Anointed one". The role of the Christ, the Messiah in Christianity, originated from the concept of the messiah in Judaism. Though the conceptions of the messiah in each religion are similar, for the most part they are distinct from one another due to the split of early Christianity and Judaism in the 1st century. Christians believe Jesus to be the Jewish messiah (Christ) of the Hebrew Bible and the Christian Old Testament.

Christians believe that the messianic prophecies were fulfilled in his mission, death, resurrection, and ascension to his Session on the heavenly throne, where "he sat down at the right hand of God, where he is now waiting until his enemies are made a footstool for his feet" (Heb 10:12–13 NET, quoting the Davidic royal Psalm 110:1). Christians believe that the rest of the messianic prophecies will be fulfilled in the Second Coming of Christ. One prophecy, distinctive in both the Jewish and Christian concept of the messiah, is that a Jewish king from the Davidic line, who will be "anointed" with holy anointing oil, will be king of God's kingdom on earth, and rule the Jewish people and mankind during the Messianic Age and World to come.

=== Islam ===
In Islam (Shia and Sunni), the Mahdi is considered as the promised one [6] but there is a difference in who the Mahdi is, the Shiites of the Twelve Imams believe that the Mahdi is Muhammad, the son of Hassan Askari, the twelfth Imam and the Imam of their time, who was born before and now He is hidden from most people by Allah's will for more than a thousand years and appears at the appointed time. But according to some people of the Sunnah, Mahdi is someone from the Prophet's generation (probably Sadat's dynasty) who has not yet been born. He will be born in the future and become the savior of mankind. Also, most of the followers of Sunnah consider Mahdi as an ordinary and very pure person, which is in contradiction with other prophecies of Abrahamic religions. Most of the Abrahamic religions have emphasized that the savior of the end of time is a divine messenger for humanity. According to Shiites, Mahdi is a divine chosen one, the proof of God and infallible. Also, they have mentioned many signs about the appearance of Mahdi. Shiites consider Mahdi an imam, and unlike Sunnis, according to their claim, relying on hadiths, traditions and verses of the Qur'an, especially the affliction of Abraham in Surah Baqarah, they consider Imamate to be a divine position and it is the highest position in the system of previous creation. They know Muhammad's status as the highest of creations. Shiites emphasize the imams' formative authority and consider them to be the manifestation of God, and they have repeatedly mentioned in their works the superhuman powers given to imams by God. In fact, Shiites are not the first ones who have proposed the savior of the apocalypse as a manifestation of God. In Hindu religion, the savior of the end of time is called Avatar, which means manifestation, Avatar comes from the word Avatarai, which means the manifestation of a superior power. Some groups of Muslims, especially the Wahhabis, consider this claim of Shiites to be completely polytheistic and superstitious. While in the Torah, the book of Genesis, 12 kings from Ismael's generation are mentioned, and Shiites consider these 12 kings to be their 12 imams. In the Sunni hadith books, 12 caliphs are mentioned after the Prophet of Islam, the last of whom is the promised Mahdi. All Muslims agree on the return of Jesus Christ, and some Sunnis and all Shiites of twelve Imams believe in the return of Christ at the time of the appearance of the Mahdi and consider him one of the special helpers of the promised Mahdi.

Mainstream Sunni timeline

Mainstream Islamic timeline

In Islam, Isa ibn Maryam is the al-Masih ("Jesus son of Mary, the Messiah") who is believed to have been anointed from birth by Allah with the specific task of being a prophet and a king. In Islam, the Mahdi is believed to hold the task of establishing the truth and fighting against divisions of Islam, uniting all sects before the return of Jesus who will kill the false messiah Al-Masih ad-Dajjal (similar to the Antichrist in Christianity), who will emerge shortly before him in human form in the end of the times, claiming that he is the messiah. Then Jesus will pray for the death of Gog and Magog (Yajuj Majuj) who are an ancient tribe sealed away from humanity who will rise to cause destruction. After he has destroyed al-Dajjal, Mahdi's final task will be to become a just king and to re-establish justice. After the death of Mahdi, Jesus' reign of the messianic King will begin bringing long-lasting peace in the world until the Day of Judgement.

Sahih al-Bukhari, 3:43:656: Narrated Abu Hurairah:

Allah's Apostle said, "The Hour will not be established until the son of Mary (Mariam) (i.e. Jesus) descends amongst you as a just ruler, he will break the cross, kill the pigs, and abolish the Jizya tax. Money will be in abundance so that nobody will accept it (as charitable gifts)."

The Ahmadiyya Muslim community believes that the prophecies regarding the advent of the Messiah and Mahdi have been fulfilled in the person of Mirza Ghulam Ahmad of Qadian. He claimed to be the Promised Messiah and Mahdi, the metaphorical second coming of Jesus of Nazareth and the divine guide, whose advent was foretold by the Prophet of Islam, Muhammad.

=== Druze faith ===
In the Druze faith, Jesus is considered the Messiah and one of God's important prophets, being among the seven prophets who appeared in different periods of history. According to the Druze manuscripts Jesus is the Greatest Imam and the incarnation of Ultimate Reason (Akl) on earth and the first cosmic principle (Hadd), and regards Jesus and Hamza ibn Ali as the incarnations of one of the five great celestial powers, who form part of their system. Druze doctrines include the beliefs that Jesus was born of a virgin named Mary, performed miracles, and died by crucifixion.

In the Druze tradition, Jesus is known under three titles: the True Messiah (al-Masih al-Haq), the Messiah of all Nations (Masih al-Umam), and the Messiah of Sinners. This is due, respectively, to the belief that Jesus delivered the true Gospel message, the belief that he was the Saviour of all nations, and the belief that he offers forgiveness.

Druze believe that Hamza ibn Ali was a reincarnation of Jesus, and that Hamza ibn Ali is the true Messiah, who directed the deeds of the messiah Jesus "the son of Joseph and Mary", but when messiah Jesus "the son of Joseph and Mary" strayed from the path of the true Messiah, Hamza filled the hearts of the Jews with hatred for him – and for that reason, they crucified him, according to the Druze manuscripts. Despite this, Hamza ibn Ali took him down from the cross and allowed him to return to his family, in order to prepare men for the preaching of his religion.

=== Bábism and Baháʼí Faith ===
He whom God shall make manifest (Arabic: من يظهر الله, Persian: مظهر کلّیه الهی) is a messianic figure in the religion of Bábism. The messianic figure was repeatedly mentioned by the Báb, the founder of Bábism, in His book, the Bayán. The Báb described the messianic figure as the origin of all divine attributes, and stated that his command was equivalent to God’s command. The Báb stated that once the messianic figure had arrived, the perusal of one of his verses was to be greater than a thousand perusals of the Bayán. The prediction is widely recognized as being fulfilled by Bahá'u'lláh, the founder of the Baháʼí Faith.

== Other religions ==
=== Buddhism ===
Maitreya is a bodhisattva who in the Buddhist tradition is to appear on Earth, achieve complete enlightenment, and teach the pure dharma. According to scriptures, Maitreya will be a successor of the historic Śākyamuni Buddha, the founder of Buddhism. The prophecy of the arrival of Maitreya is found in the canonical literature of all Buddhist sects (Theravāda, Mahāyāna, Vajrayāna) and is accepted by most Buddhists as a statement about an actual event that will take place in the distant future.

Although Maitreya Buddha appears in the canonical literature shared by many sects of Buddhism, Buddhists in different historical contexts have conceived of Maitreya Buddha in different ways. In early medieval Chinese Buddhism, for example, Taoist and Buddhist ideas combined to produce a particular emphasis on the messianic role of a Bodhisattva called "Prince Moonlight." Furthermore, the Chinese Maitreyan traditions were themselves marked by considerable diversity. Erik Zürcher has argued that a certain "canonical" Maitreyan cult from the fourth to sixth centuries believed Maitreya to inhabit the Tushita heaven where Buddhists might be reborn in the very distant future. Another rival tradition, however, believed that Maitreya would appear in the imminent future in this world to provide salvation during a time of misery and decline. This latter form of Maitreyan belief was generally censored and condemned as heretical to the point that few manuscripts survive written by Buddhists sympathetic to this tradition.

Maitreya Buddha continued to be an important figure in millenarian rebellions throughout Chinese history such as in the rebellions associated with the so-called White Lotus Society.

=== Cargo cults ===
John Frum is a figure associated with cargo cults on the island of Tanna in Vanuatu. He is often depicted as an American World War II serviceman who will bring wealth and prosperity to the people if they follow him. He is sometimes portrayed as black, sometimes as white. Quoting David Attenborough's report of an encounter: "'E look like you. 'E got white face. 'E tall man. 'E live 'long South America."

=== Nazi messianism ===
There has been significant literature on the potential religious aspects of Nazism. Wilfried Daim suggests that Hitler and the Nazi leadership planned to replace Christianity in Germany with a new religion in which Hitler would be considered a messiah. In his book on the connection between Lanz von Liebenfels and Hitler, Daim published a reprint of an alleged document of a session on "the unconditional abolishment of all religious commitments (Religionsbekenntnisse) after the final victory (Endsieg) ... with a simultaneous proclamation of Adolf Hitler as the new messiah."

Within the Wotansvolk Neo-Völkisch mystery religion, David Eden Lane is regarded as the "666 Man" and the "Man David" of prophecy, an anti-Christian "Messiah" incarnated to "warn and save the White Aryan race from near extinction".

=== Russian and Slavic messianism ===
Romantic Slavic messianism held that the Slavs, especially the Russians, suffer in order that other European nations, and eventually all of humanity, may be redeemed. This theme had a profound impact in the development of Pan-Slavism and Russian and Soviet imperialism; it also appears in works by the Polish Romantic poets Zygmunt Krasiński and Adam Mickiewicz, including the latter's familiar expression, "Polska Chrystusem narodów" ("Poland is the Christ of nations"). Messianic ideas appear in the "Books of the Genesis of the Ukrainian People" (Brotherhood of Saints Cyril and Methodius Manifesto), in which universal equality and democracy in the Zaporizhian Sich, recognized as a revival of human society initially planned by God and faith in its future revival, associated with faith in the death and resurrection of Christ. Reborn Ukraine will expand universal freedom and faith in all Slavic countries and, thus designed by God, an ideal society will be restored.

=== Sebastianism ===
Sebastianism (Portuguese: Sebastianismo) is a Portuguese messianic myth, based on the belief that King Sebastian of Portugal, disappeared in the battle of Alcácer Quibir, will return to Portugal and create the Fifth Empire. The belief gained momentum after an interpretation by priest António Vieira of Daniel 2 and the Book of Revelation. In Brazil the most important manifestation of Sebastianism took place in the context of the Proclamation of the Republic, when movements emerged that defended a return to the monarchy. It is categorised as an example of the King asleep in mountain folk motif, typified by people waiting for a hero. The Portuguese author Fernando Pessoa wrote about such a hero in his epic Mensagem (The Message).

It is one of the longest-lived and most influential millenarian legends in Western Europe, having had profound political and cultural resonances from the time of Sebastians death till at least the late 19th century in Brazil.

=== Taoism ===
Around the 3rd century CE, religious Taoism developed eschatological ideas. A number of scriptures predict the end of the world cycle, the deluge, epidemics, and coming of the saviour Li Hong 李弘 (not to be confused with the Tang personalities).

=== Wicca, Stregheria, Neopaganism and Witchcraft ===
Aradia is one of the principal figures in the American folklorist Charles Godfrey Leland's 1899 work Aradia, or the Gospel of the Witches, which he believed to be a genuine religious text used by a group of pagan witches in Tuscany, a claim that has subsequently been disputed by other folklorists and historians. In Leland's Gospel, Aradia is portrayed as a Messiah who was sent to Earth in order to teach the oppressed peasants how to perform witchcraft to use against the Roman Catholic Church and the upper classes.

Since the publication of Leland's Gospel, Aradia has become "arguably one of the central figures of the modern pagan witchcraft revival" and as such has featured in various forms of Neopaganism, including Wicca and Stregheria, as an actual deity. Raven Grimassi, founder of the Wiccan-inspired tradition of Stregheria, claims that Aradia was a historical figure named Aradia di Toscano, who led a group of "Diana-worshipping witches" in 14th-century Tuscany.

=== Zoroastrianism ===
According to Zoroastrian philosophy, redacted in the Zand-i Vohuman Yasht,

at the end of thy tenth hundredth winter [...] the sun is more unseen and more spotted; the year, month, and day are shorter; and the earth is more barren; and the crop will not yield the seed; and men [...] become more deceitful and more given to vile practices. They have no gratitude. Honorable wealth will all proceed to those of perverted faith [...] and a dark cloud makes the whole sky night [...] and it will rain more noxious creatures than winter.

Saoshyant, the Man of Peace, battles the forces of evil. The events of the final renovation are described in the Bundahishn (30.1ff): "In the final battle with evil, the yazatas Airyaman and Atar will 'melt the metal in the hills and mountains, and it will be upon the earth like a river' (Bundahishn 34.18), but the righteous (ashavan) will not be harmed."

Eventually, Ahura Mazda will triumph, and his agent Saoshyant will resurrect the dead, whose bodies will be restored to eternal perfection, and whose souls will be cleansed and reunited with God. Time will then end, and truth/righteousness (asha) and immortality will thereafter be everlasting.

=== Assets ===
Zoroastrian Dr. Ardeshir Khorshedian, physician, researcher, writer and head of the Mobidan Association of Tehran, described the idea of Saoshyant as having been developed by the Zoroastrians and that the idea that Saoshyant is the promised one came from the Jews, but with the Islamic conquest of Persia the idea became more widespread among the Zoroastrians.

Also Cyrus Niknam, a Mobad, writer and researcher of ancient Iranian culture, says that the idea of a savior is a wrong interpretation by the priests of the Sassanian era and that in reality there is no savior but rather a correct interpretation of the word Saoshyant is the useful from the sacred.

Maneckji Nusserwanji Dhalla Pakistani Zoroastrian priest and religious scholar add that the word Saoshyant is not a name of any particular individual, but as a generic term, designating Zarathushtra and his fellow workers

Dina G. McIntyre, an Indian Zoroastrian woman, had lectures on the teachings of the Gathas, denied the existence of a savior and considered it an idea that appeared in later literature.

The influence of Zoroastrianism on Judaism in the fields of angeology, demonology and eschatology is a widely held theory. Other scholars, like James Darmesteter, emphasize the inverse influence Judaism has had on Zoroastrianism. There is also the example of Dr. Kersey Antia (the Zoroastrian High Priest of Chicago, Illinois), who plays down the "Persian influence" between the religions.

== See also ==
- Messiah complex

== Bibliography ==
- Millenarianism and Messianism in Early Modern Culture, (4 voll.), Dordrecht: Kluwer.
  - Vol. 1: Goldish, Matt and Popkin, Richard H. (eds.). Jewish Messianism in the Early Modern World, 2001.
  - Vol. 2: Kottmnan, Karl (eds.). Catholic Millenarianism: From Savonarola to the Abbè Grégoire, 2001.
  - Vol. 3: Force, James E. and Popkin, Richard H. (eds.). The Millenarian Turn: Millenarian Contexts of Science, Politics and Everyday Anglo-American Life in the Seventeenth and Eighteenth Centuries, 2001.
  - Vol. 4: Laursen, John Christian and Popkin, Richard H. (eds.). Continental Millenarians: Protestants, Catholics, Heretics, 2001.
- Bockmuehl, Markus and Paget, James Carleton Paget (eds.), Redemption and Resistance. The Messianic Hopes of Jews and Christians in Antiquity London, New York: T & T Clark, 2009.
- Desroche, Henri, Dieux d'hommes. Dictionnaire des messianismes et millénarismes de l'ère chrétienne, The Hague: Mouton, 1969.
- Idel, Moshe, Messianic Mystics, New Haven: Yale University Press, 1998.
- Kavka, Martin, Jewish Messianism and the History of Philosophy, Cambridge: Cambridge University Press, 2004.
- Saperstein, Marc (ed.), Essential Papers on Messianic Movements and Personalities in Jewish History, NY: New York University Press, 1992.
