= Dianic cult =

Dianic cult may refer to:

- the cult of Diana (goddess)
- the Cult of Herodias in medieval folklore.
- the Witch-cult_hypothesis#Murray in 19th century Romanticism, invented by Margaret Murray.
