= Witch-cult hypothesis =

Discredited theory about witchcraft trials

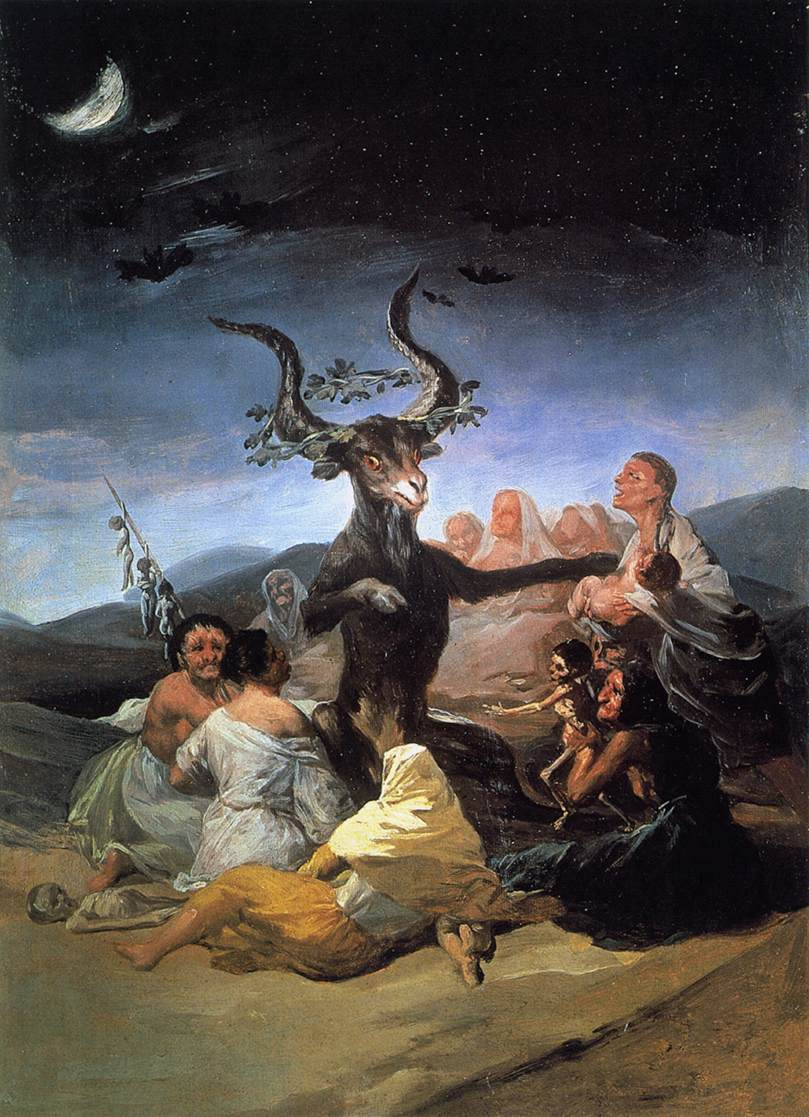
Francisco de Goya's Witches' Sabbath (1789), which depicts the Devil flanked by Satanic witches. The witch-cult hypothesis states that such stories are based upon a real-life pagan cult that revered a horned deity.

The witch-cult hypothesis is a discredited theory that the witch trials of the Early Modern period were an attempt to suppress a pagan religion that had survived the Christianization of Europe. According to its proponents, accused witches were actually followers of this alleged religion. They argue that the witch cult revolved around worshiping a Horned God of fertility and the underworld, whom Christian persecutors identified with the Devil, and whose followers held nocturnal rites at the witches' Sabbath.

The theory was pioneered by two German scholars, Karl Ernst Jarcke and Franz Josef Mone, in the early nineteenth century, and was adopted by French historian Jules Michelet, American feminist Matilda Joslyn Gage, and American folklorist Charles Leland later that century. The hypothesis received its most prominent exposition when it was adopted by British Egyptologist Margaret Murray, who presented her version of it in The Witch-Cult in Western Europe (1921), before further expounding it in books such as The God of the Witches (1931) and her contribution to the Encyclopædia Britannica. Although the "Murrayite theory" proved popular among sectors of academia and the general public in the early and mid-twentieth century, it was never accepted by scholars of the witch trials, who publicly disproved it through in-depth research during the 1960s and 1970s.

Contemporary experts in European witchcraft beliefs view the pagan witch cult theory as pseudohistorical. There is now an academic consensus that those accused and executed as witches were not followers of any witch religion, pagan or otherwise. Critics highlight several flaws with the theory. It rested on highly selective use of evidence from the trials, thereby heavily misrepresenting the events and the actions of both the accused and their accusers. It also mistakenly assumed that statements made by accused witches were truthful, and not distorted by coercion and torture. Further, despite theories that the witch cult was a pre-Christian survival, there is no evidence of such a pagan witch cult throughout the Middle Ages.

The witch-cult hypothesis has influenced literature, being adapted into fiction in works by John Buchan, Robert Graves, and others. It greatly influenced Wicca, a new religious movement of modern Paganism that emerged in mid-twentieth-century Britain and represented itself as a survival of the pagan witch cult. Since the 1960s, Carlo Ginzburg and other scholars have argued that surviving elements of pre-Christian religion in European folk culture influenced Early Modern stereotypes of witchcraft, but scholars still debate how this may relate, if at all, to the Murrayite witch-cult hypothesis.

== Early modern precedents ==
The witch-hunt of the 16th and 17th centuries was an organized effort by authorities in many countries to destroy a supposed conspiracy of witches thought to pose a deadly threat to Christendom. According to these authorities, witches were numerous, and in conscious alliance with Satan, forming a sort of Satanic counter-religion. Witch-hunts in this sense must be separated from the belief in witches, the evil eye, and other such phenomena, which are common features of folk belief worldwide. The belief that witches are not just individual villains but conspirators organized in a powerful but well-hidden cult is a distinguishing feature of the early modern witch-hunt.

This idea of an organized witch-cult originates in the second half of the 15th century, notoriously expounded in the 1486 Malleus Maleficarum. In the following two centuries, witch trials usually included the charge of membership in a demonic conspiracy, gathering in sabbaths, and similar. It was only with the beginning Age of Enlightenment in the early 18th century, that the idea of an organized witch-cult was abandoned.

Early Modern testimonies of accused witches "confirming" the existence of a witch cult are considered doubtful. Norman Cohn has argued that such testimonies were often given under torture, and that their details were determined mainly by the expectations of the interrogators and by free association on the part of the accused, reflecting only the popular imagination of the times. Carlo Ginzburg and Éva Pócs hold that some of these testimonies can still give insights into the belief systems of the accused. Ginzburg discovered records of a group calling themselves benandanti, the "good walkers" who believed that they combatted witches (streghe) by magical means. The benandanti were persecuted for heresy in the period of 1575 to 1675.

== The early theory ==
=== Jarcke and Mone ===
Throughout the eighteenth and nineteenth centuries, the common belief among educated sectors of the European populace was that there had never been any genuine cult of witches and that all those persecuted and executed as such had been innocent of the alleged crimes. At this time, two figures independently raised the prospect that the witch trials had been influenced by stereotypes and folk customs that had pre-Christian origins. In his 1749 work Del Congresso Notturno delle Lamie (On the Nocturnal Meeting of Witches), the Italian cleric Girolamo Tartarotti wrote that the stereotype of the witch in Early Modern Europe was influenced by pre-Christian folk beliefs. Similar ideas were echoed by the German folklorist Jacob Grimm in his Deutsche Mythologie (Teutonic Mythology), first published in 1835. Here, he wrote that the witch stereotype reflected a blending of pre-Christian folk traditions with the later Medieval views of heresy. Both Tartarotti and Grimm would subsequently be erroneously cited as having stated that the witches had been members of a surviving pre-Christian cult.

The first modern scholar to advance the idea that the witch trials had been designed to wipe out an anti-Christian sect was the German Karl Ernst Jarcke, a professor of criminal law at the University of Berlin. In 1828 he edited the records of a seventeenth-century German witch trial for publication in a legal journal, and included the theory in his own comments. Jarcke suggested that witchcraft had been a pre-Christian religion that survived Christianisation among the rural population, but that after being condemned as Satanism by the Church, it eventually degenerated into genuine Devil-worship and malevolence. At that point, the wider population came to reject it, resulting in the trials. This theory exonerated the Christian Church of blame by asserting that they had been acting on the wishes of the population, while at the same time not accepting the literal intervention of the Devil in human affairs which liberal rationalists disbelieved. In 1832, Felix Mendelssohn adopted similar ideas when composing his orchestral piece, Die Erste Walpurgisnacht, in which a group of pagan villagers pretend to be witches in order to scare away Christians intent on disrupting their Walpurgis Night festivities.

Jarcke's theories were adopted and altered by the German historian Franz Josef Mone in 1839. While serving as director of archives at Baden, he published his ideas in a paper in which he asserted that the pre-Christian religion which degenerated into Satanic witchcraft was not Germanic in origin, but had instead been practised by slaves who had come in contact with the Greek cults of Hecate and Dionysus on the north coast of the Black Sea. According to Mone, these slaves adopted these cults and fused them with their own pagan faiths to form witchcraft, a religion that venerated a goat-like god, celebrated nocturnal orgies and practised poisoning and malevolent magic. This horrified the free-born population both in the pagan period and the Christian era, eventually resulting in the witch trials. However, as English historian Norman Cohn asserted in 1975, "neither of [Jarcke or Mone's] theories are convincing", with neither being able to show any evidence of pre-Christian gods being worshipped in Early Modern Germany or being able to explain why there were no accounts of this witch-cult in between the Christianization and the trials themselves. Both Jarcke and Mone were politically conservative, and their depiction of the threatening witch-cult would have had parallels with the widespread conservative fear of secret societies as bringers of revolution and irreligion in early nineteenth-century Europe.

=== Michelet, Gage, and Leland ===
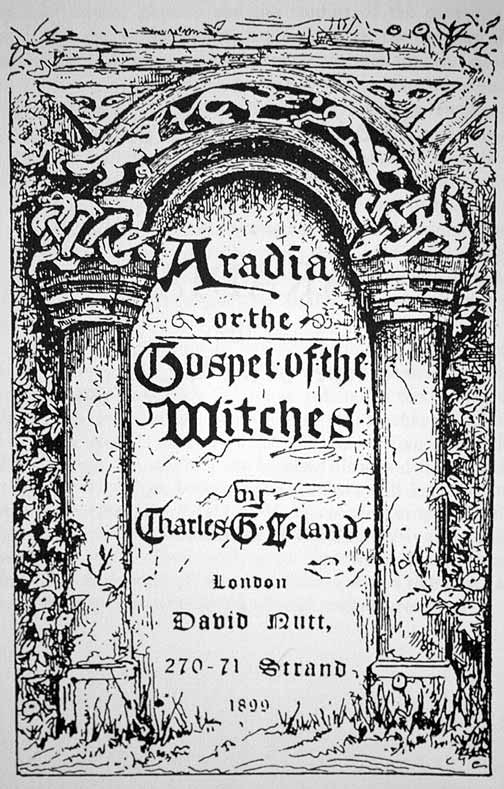
1899 cover of Aradia, or the Gospel of the Witches

In 1862, French historian Jules Michelet published La Sorcière (The Witch), in which he adapted the theory further. Michelet, a liberal who despised both the Roman Catholic Church and absolute monarchies, wrote that the Witch Cult had been practiced by the peasants in opposition to Roman Catholicism, which was practiced by the upper classes. He wrote that the witches had been mostly women (he greatly admired the feminine sex, once stating that it was the superior of the two), and that they had been great healers, whose knowledge was the basis of much of modern medicine. He believed that they worshiped the god Pan, who had become equated with the Christian figure of the Devil over time. When Michelet's La Sorcière was first published in France, it was, according to historian Ronald Hutton, "greeted with silence from French literary critics, apparently because they recognized that it was not really history".

In 1893, an American suffragist, Matilda Joslyn Gage, published Woman, Church and State, in which she wrote that in the prehistoric world, humanity had been matriarchal, worshiping a great Goddess, and that the witches of the witch cult had been pagan priestesses preserving this religion.

In 1897, the English scholar Karl Pearson, who was the professor of Applied Mathematics at University College London and an amateur historian and anthropologist, expanded on Michelet's theory. Pearson agreed with the theory of a prehistoric matriarchal society, and concurred with Gage that the witch-cult was a survival of it. Pearson theorized that during the Christian era, the religion began to emphasise the male deity, which was then equated with the Christian Devil. Pearson also wrote that Joan of Arc had been one of the last few priestesses of the religion. He was, however, unlike Michelet or Gage, opposed to the group and to Goddess worship in general, believing that it was primitive and savage.

Charles Leland was an American folklorist and occultist who travelled around Europe in the latter 19th century and was a supporter of Michelet's theories. In 1899 he published Aradia, or the Gospel of the Witches, which he presented as having been a sacred text for Italian witches. It made no mention of a horned god, but did mention a male deity known as Lucifer, as well as a female deity, the goddess Diana. Leland's work would provide much of the inspiration for the neopagan witchcraft religion of Stregheria.

== Impact of Margaret Murray ==
In 1915, Margaret Murray was an Egyptologist who worked under Sir Flinders Petrie at University College London. However, the outbreak of World War I had meant that many of their staff and students had abandoned scholarship to aid the British war effort, while archaeological excavation to Egypt had been rendered impossible. These events gave Murray more latitude in her studies, and she began to branch out and explore other interests. To aid Britain's war effort, Murray enrolled as a volunteer nurse in the Volunteer Aid Detachment of the College Women's Union Society, and for several weeks was posted to Saint-Malo in France. However, after being taken ill herself, she was sent to recuperate in Glastonbury, Somerset, where she became interested in Glastonbury Abbey and the folklore surrounding it which connected it to the legendary figure of King Arthur and to the idea that the Holy Grail had been brought there by Joseph of Aramathea. Pursuing this interest, she published the paper "Egyptian Elements in the Grail Romance" in the journal Ancient Egypt, although few agreed with her conclusions and it was criticised by scholars like Jessie Weston for making unsubstantiated leaps with the evidence.

Returning to London, she began to work on the concept of witchcraft. Her first published work on the subject was an article in the academic journal Folklore in 1917, which she followed with a second in 1920. Further articles on the subject appeared in the journal of the Royal Anthropological Institute and the Scottish Historical Review.

=== The Witch-Cult in Western Europe: 1921 ===
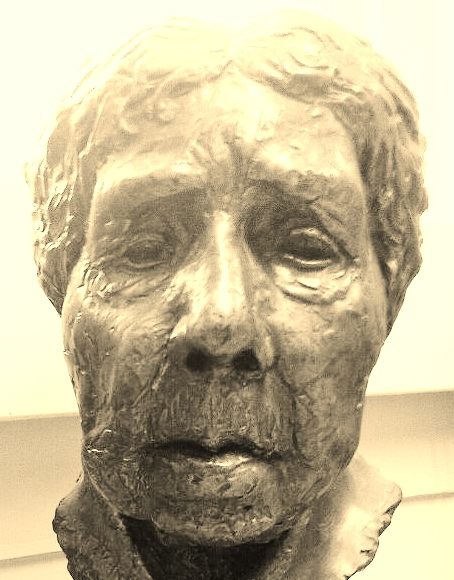
Bust of Murray held in the library of the UCL Institute of Archaeology.

In The Witch-Cult in Western Europe, Murray stated that she had restricted her research to Great Britain, although made some recourse to sources from France, Flanders, and New England. She drew a division between what she termed "Operative Witchcraft", which referred to the performance of charms and spells with any purpose, and "Ritual Witchcraft", by which she meant "the ancient religion of Western Europe", a fertility-based faith that she also termed "the Dianic cult". She wrote that the cult had "very probably" once been devoted to the worship of both a male deity and a "Mother Goddess" but that "at the time when the cult is recorded the worship of the male deity appears to have superseded that of the female". In her thesis, Murray stated that the figure referred to as the Devil in the trial accounts was the witches' god, "manifest and incarnate", to whom the witches offered their prayers. She wrote that at the witches' meetings, the god would be personified, usually by a man or at times by a woman or an animal; when a human personified this entity, Murray described them as usually dressed plainly, though they appeared in full costume for the witches' Sabbaths.

Members joined the cult either as children or adults through what Murray called "admission ceremonies"; Murray asserted that applicants had to agree to join of their own free will, and agree to devote themselves to the service of their deity. She also wrote that in some cases, these individuals had to sign a covenant or were baptized into the faith. At the same time, she wrote that the religion was largely passed down hereditary lines. Murray described the religion as being divided into covens containing thirteen members, led by a coven officer who was often termed the "Devil" in the trial accounts, but who was accountable to a "Grand Master". According to Murray, the records of the coven were kept in a secret book, with the coven also disciplining its members, to the extent of executing those deemed traitors.

Describing this witch-cult as "a joyous religion", she wrote that the two primary festivals that it celebrated were on May Eve and November Eve, although that other dates of religious observation were 1 February and 1 August, the winter and summer solstices, and Easter. She asserted that the "General Meeting of all members of the religion" were known as Sabbaths, while the more private ritual meetings were known as Esbats. Murray said that these Esbats were nocturnal rites that began at midnight, and that they were "primarily for business, whereas the Sabbath was purely religious." At Esbats, magical rites were performed both for malevolent and benevolent ends. She also asserted that the Sabbath ceremonies involved the witches' paying homage to the deity, renewing their "vows of fidelity and obedience" to him, and providing him with accounts of all the magical actions that they had conducted since the previous Sabbath. Once this business had been concluded, admissions to the cult or marriages were conducted; ceremonies and fertility rites took place; and the Sabbath concluded with feasting and dancing.

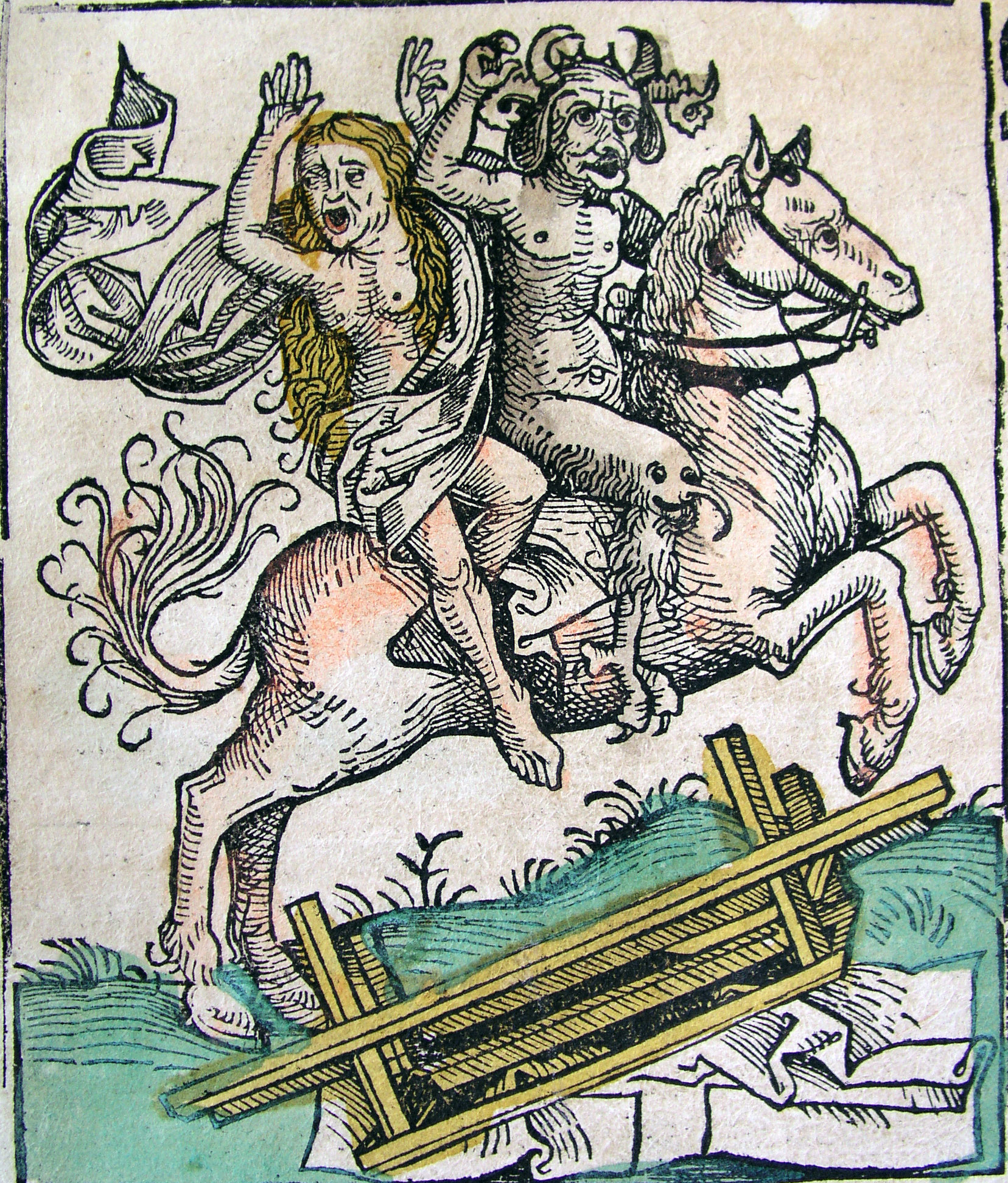
The Devil on horseback. Nuremberg Chronicle (1493).

Deeming Ritual Witchcraft to be "a fertility cult", she asserted that many of its rites were designed to ensure fertility and rain-making. She wrote that there were four types of sacrifice performed by the witches: blood-sacrifice, in which neophytes write their names in blood, the sacrifice of animals, the sacrifice of a non-Christian child to procure magical powers, and the sacrifice of the witches' god by fire to ensure fertility. She interpreted accounts of witches' shapeshifting into various animals as being representative of a rite in which the witches dressed as specific animals which they took to be sacred. She asserted that accounts of familiars were based on the witches' use of animals, which she divided into "divining familiars" used in divination and "domestic familiars" used in other magic rites.

Murray asserted that paganism had survived the Christianization process in Britain, although that it came to be "practised only in certain places and among certain classes of the community." She believed that folkloric stories of fairies in Britain were based on a surviving race of dwarves, who continued to live in the island up until the Early Modern period. She asserted that this race followed the same pagan religion as the witches, thus explaining the folkloric connection between the two. In the appendices to the book, she also alleged that Joan of Arc and Gilles de Rais were members of the witch-cult and were executed for it, a position which has been refuted by historians, especially in the case of Joan of Arc.

Later historian Ronald Hutton commented that The Witch-Cult in Western Europe "rested upon a small amount of archival research, with extensive use of printed trial records in 19th century editions, plus early modern pamphlets and works of demonology". He also noted that the book's tone was generally "dry and clinical, and every assertion was meticulously footned to a source, with lavish quotation." It was not a best seller; in its first thirty years, only 2,020 copies were sold. However, it led many people to treat Murray as an authority on the subject; in 1929, she was invited to provide the entry on "Witchcraft" for the Encyclopædia Britannica, and used it to present her interpretation of the subject as if it were universally accepted in scholarship. It remained in the encyclopedia until being replaced in 1968.

=== The God of the Witches: 1931 ===
Murray followed this book with The God of the Witches in 1931; although similar in content, it was aimed at a mass market audience and published by the popular press Sampson Low. Whereas the tone in The Witch-Cult in Western Europe had been "dry and academic, the second bubbles with enthusiasm", as her language becomes "emotionally inflated and coloured with religious phraseology"; in particular she refers repeatedly to the cult as "the Old Religion". In this work she "cut out or toned down" many of the assertions of her previous book which would have painted the cult in a bad light, for instance regarding animal and child sacrifice, and also omitted any mention of sex.

In this book she began to refer to the witches' deity as the Horned God, and asserted that it was an entity who had been worshipped in Europe since the Palaeolithic. She further asserted that in the Bronze Age, the worship of the deity could be found throughout Europe, Asia, and parts of Africa, writing that the depiction of various horned figures from these societies proved that. Among the evidence cited were the horned figures found at Mohenjo-Daro, which are often interpreted as depictions of Pashupati, as well as the deities Osiris and Amon in Egypt and the Minotaur of Minoan Crete. Within continental Europe, she wrote that the Horned God was represented by Pan in Greece, Cernunnos in Gaul, and in various Scandinavian rock carvings. Writing that this divinity had been declared the Devil by the Christian authorities, she nevertheless asserted that his worship was testified in officially Christian societies right through to the Modern period, citing folkloric practices such as the Dorset Ooser and the Puck Fair as evidence of his veneration.

=== The Divine King in England: 1954 ===
In 1954, she published The Divine King in England, in which she greatly extended on the theory, taking in an influence from Sir James Frazer's The Golden Bough, an anthropological book that made the proposal that societies all over the world sacrificed their kings to the deities of nature. In her book, she wrote that this practice had continued into medieval England, and that, for instance, the death of William II was really a ritual sacrifice. She also wrote that a number of important figures who died violent deaths, such as Archbishop Thomas Becket, were killed as a replacement for the king. No academic took the book seriously, and it was ignored by many of her supporters. It did however influence a few historical novels e.g. Philip Lindsay's The Devil and King John.

=== Academic reception: 1921–63 ===
Upon initial publication, Murray's thesis gained a favourable reception from many readers, including a number of significant scholars, albeit none of whom were experts in the witch trials. Historians of Early Modern Britain like Sir George Clark and Christopher Hill incorporated her theories into their work, although Hill later publicly regretted doing so. For the 1961 reprint of The Witch-Cult in Western Europe, Medieval historian Steven Runciman provided a foreword in which he accepted that some of Murray's "minor details may be open to criticism", but in which he was otherwise supportive of her thesis. Her theories were recapitulated by Pennethorne Hughes in his 1952 book Witches. It was also adopted and championed by the archaeologist T. C. Lethbridge, marking his increasing estrangement from mainstream academia; in turn, Murray publicly defended his controversial theories regarding the chalk hill figures of Wandlebury Hill in the Gog Magog Hills, Cambridgeshire. As a result, a commentator writing in 1962 could comment that the Murrayite interpretations of the witch trials "seem to hold, at the time of writing, an almost undisputed sway at the higher intellectual levels", being widely accepted among "educated people".

Canadian historian Elliot Rose suggested that the reason why Murray's theory gained such support was partly because of her "imposing credentials" as a member of staff at UCL, a position that lent her theory greater legitimacy in the eyes of many readers. He further suggested that the Murrayite view was attractive to many as it confirmed "the general picture of pre-Christian Europe a reader of Frazer or [Robert] Graves would be familiar with". Similarly, Hutton suggested that the cause of the Murrayite theory's popularity was because it "appealed to so many of the emotional impulses of the age", including "the notion of the English countryside as a timeless place full of ancient secrets", the literary popularity of Pan, the widespread belief that the majority of British had remained pagan long after the process of Christianisation, and the idea that folk customs represented pagan survivals. At the same time, Hutton suggested, it seemed more plausible to many than the previously dominant rationalist idea that the witch trials were the result of mass delusion. Related to this, folklorist Jacqueline Simpson suggested that part of the Murrayite theory's appeal was that it appeared to give a "sensible, demystifying, liberating approach to a longstanding but sterile argument" between the rationalists who denied that there had been any witches and those, like Montague Summers, who insisted that there had been a real Satanic conspiracy against Christendom in the Early Modern period replete with witches with supernatural powers. As Hilda Ellis Davidson noted; "how refreshing and exciting her first book was at that period. A new approach, and such a surprising one."

Surely, discussion of what confessedly is so unripe is premature. When Miss Murray has broadened her study to all the lands where she can find the "cult"; when she has dealt with documents worthier the name of records than the chap-books and the formless reports that have to serve us for the British trials; when she has traced back witch-sabbath and questionary through the centuries of witch and heretic hunting that precede the British; when she has trusted herself to study the work of other students and fairly to weigh their conclusions against her own in the light of the further evidence they may adduce: then perhaps she may have modified her views. Whether she changes or confirms them, she will then have earned the right to a hearing.

— George L. Burr, 1922.

Nevertheless, Murray's theories never received support from experts in the Early Modern witch trials, and from her early publications onward many of her ideas were challenged by those who highlighted her "factual errors and methodological failings". Indeed, the majority of scholarly reviews of her work produced at the time were largely critical. George L. Burr critically reviewed both of her initial books on the subject for the American Historical Review. In his review of The Witch-Cult in Western Europe he asserted that she was not acquainted with the "careful general histories by modern scholars" and criticised her for assuming that the trial accounts accurately reflected the accused witches' genuine experiences of witchcraft, regardless of whether those confessions had been obtained through torture and coercion. He also charged her with selectively using the evidence to serve her interpretation, for instance by omitting any supernatural or miraculous events that appear in the trial accounts. As Pagan studies scholar Catherine Noble later put it, "Burr has hardly a kind word for Murray".

One of the foremost specialists of the trial records, L'Estrange Ewen, brought out a series of books specialising in the archival material which rejected Murray's ideas. Similarly, W.R. Halliday reviewed her work for the Folklore journal and exposed the flaws in her use of sources. E. M. Loeb criticised her in his review of The Witch-Cult in Western Europe for American Anthropologist. In Noble's words, "There is no constructive criticism between peers here; it is a frontal attack on an author Loeb clearly believes has no place among published historians, at least on the topic of witchcraft."

In his 1962 work A Razor for a Goat, Rose asserted that Murray's books on the witch-cult "contain an incredible number of minor errors of fact or of calculation and several inconsistencies of reasoning." He accepted that her case "could, perhaps, still be proved by somebody else, though I very much doubt it." Highlighting that there is a gap of about a thousand years between the Christianisation of Britain and the start of the witch trials there, he asserts that there is no evidence for the existence of the witch-cult anywhere in the intervening period. He further criticises her for treating pre-Christian Britain as a socially and culturally monolithic entity, whereas in reality it contained a diverse array of societies and religious beliefs. In addition to this, he challenged Murray's assertion that the majority of Britons in the Middle Ages remained pagan as "a view grounded on ignorance alone".

Simpson noted that despite these critical reviews, within the field of British folkloristics Murray's theories were permitted "to pass unapproved but unchallenged, either out of politeness or because nobody was really interested enough to research the topic." As evidence, she noted that no substantial research articles on the subject of witchcraft were published in the journal Folklore between Murray's in 1917 and Rossell Hope Robbins' in 1963. However, she also highlighted that when regional studies of British folklore were published in this period by folklorists like Theo Brown, Ruth Tongue, or Enid Porter, none adopted the Murrayite framework for interpreting witchcraft beliefs, as evidence that Murray's theories were widely ignored by scholars of folklore.

Murray did not respond directly to the criticisms of her work, but did react to her critics in a hostile manner; in later life she asserted that she eventually ceased reading reviews of her work, and believed that her critics were simply acting on religious prejudice. Noble later stated that Murray "repeatedly dismissed [her critics] in print as close-minded, bigoted, or uninformed."

=== Academic reception: 1963–present ===
Murray's work came to be increasingly criticised following her death in 1963, with the definitive academic rejection of the Murrayite witch-cult theory occurring during the 1970s. At this time, a variety of scholars across Europe and North America began to publish in-depth studies of the archival records from the witch trials, leaving no doubt that those tried for witchcraft were not practitioners of a surviving pre-Christian religion. Such critics of Murray included Alan Macfarlane, Erik Midelfort, William Monter, Robert Muchembled, Gerhard Schormann, Bente Alver and Bengt Ankarloo.

In his 1971 book Religion and the Decline of Magic, English historian Keith Thomas dismissed Murray's thesis when he asserted that scholarship on the Early Modern witch trials had established that there was "very little evidence to suggest that the accused witches were either devil-worshippers or members of a pagan fertility cult". Although accepting that when she first published her ideas, they were "the best alternative" to the dominant "rationalist" view of witchcraft as "total delusion", he stated that her conclusions were "almost totally groundless" because she ignored the systematic study of the trial accounts provided by Ewen and instead used sources very selectively to argue her point. In his 1975 book Europe's Inner Demons, English historian Norman Cohn commented on the "extraordinary" manner in which Murray's theory had come to "exercise considerable influence" within scholarship. Cohn was nevertheless highly critical; he asserted that Murray's "knowledge of European history, even of English history, was superficial and her grasp of historical method was non-existent." Furthermore, he added that her ideas were "firmly set in an exaggerated and distorted version of the Frazerian mould." That same year, the Romanian historian of religion Mircea Eliade, writing in the History of Religions journal, described Murray's work as "hopelessly inadequate" and full of "numberless and appalling errors". He added that from the perspective of a historian of religion, "her use of comparative materials and, in general, the methods of Religionswissenschaft have been unfortunate."

That this "old religion" persisted secretly, without leaving any evidence, is of course possible, just as it is possible that below the surface of the moon lie extensive deposits of Stilton cheese. Anything is possible. But it is nonsense to assert the existence of something for which no evidence exists. The Murrayites ask us to swallow a most peculiar sandwich: a large piece of the wrong evidence between two thick slices of no evidence at all.

— Jeffrey B. Russell and Brooks Alexander, 2007.

In 1994, the English folklorist Jacqueline Simpson devoted a paper in the Folklore journal to the subject of "Margaret Murray: Who Believed Her, and Why?". She noted that the Murrayite theory was "based on deeply flawed methods and illogical arguments" and that the discipline of folkloristics had been damaged by its association with Murray, who had been appointed President of the Folklore Society. Simpson outlined how Murray had selected her use of evidence very specifically, particularly by ignoring and/or rationalising any accounts of supernatural or miraculous events in the trial records, thereby distorting the events that she was describing. Thus, Simpson pointed out, Murray wrote that the cloven-hoofed Devil appeared at the witches' Sabbath by stating that he was a man with a special kind of shoe, and similarly asserted that witches' reports of having flown through the air on broomsticks were actually based on their practice of either hopping along on broomsticks or smearing hallucinogenic salves onto themselves.

In 1996, historian Diane Purkiss asserted that Murray's thesis was "intrinsically improbable" and that it "commands little or no allegiance within the modern academy". She nevertheless felt that male scholars like Thomas, Cohn, and Macfarlane had committed "ritual slaughter" when setting up their own histories of witchcraft by condemning Murray's. In doing so, she identified a trend for them to contrast their own perceived methodologically sound and sceptical interpretations with Murray's "feminised belief" about the witch-cult, hence ignoring any theoretical considerations regarding the male-centric nature of their own perspectives.

In his 1999 book The Triumph of the Moon, Hutton asserted that Murray had treated her source material with "reckless abandon", in that she had taken "vivid details of alleged witch practices" from "sources scattered across a great extent of space and time" and then declared them to be normative of the cult as a whole. Concurring with this assessment, historian Jeffrey B. Russell and Brooks Alexander stated that "Murray's use of sources in general is appalling". They went on to assert that "Today, scholars are agreed that Murray was more than just wrong – she was completely and embarrassingly wrong on nearly all of her basic premises." In his sociological study of the Early Modern witchcraft, Gary Jensen highlighted that Murray's work had been "seriously challenged" and that it did not take into account "why it took so long for the heretic witch to be invented and targeted", noting that had the Murrayite witch-cult been a reality, then it would have been persecuted throughout the Medieval and not just in the Early Modern period.

== Later writers ==
During the 1930s and 1940s, Neo-Pagan Heinrich Himmler organised a branch of the SS to undertake the largest survey of witch-hunt trial records in Europe ever taken, with the dual aim of using it as anti-Christian propaganda, to support his theory that the inquisition had been a repression of an indigenous Völkisch Norse-Germanic nature religion, and as evidence for reconstructing that religion. This prompted Stuart Clark to dub the Nazi regime "Europe's first and only 'pro-witch' government." One pamphlet, 1935's The Christian Witch-Craze, wrote that the witch-hunts were an attempt to exterminate "Aryan womanhood".

In 1985 Classical historian Georg Luck, in his Arcana Mundi: Magic and the Occult in the Greek and Roman Worlds, theorised that the origins of the witch-cult may have appeared in late antiquity as a faith primarily designed to worship the Horned God, stemming from the merging of Cernunnos, a horned god of the Celts, with the Greco-Roman Pan/Faunus, a combination of gods which he posits created a new deity, around which the remaining pagans, those refusing to convert to Christianity, rallied and that this deity provided the prototype for later Christian conceptions of the Devil, and his worshippers were cast by the Church as witches.

While Murray's theory had received some negative critical attention at the time of its first publication, it was not until the 1950s and 1960s that her books became best sellers, reaching a larger audience and thereby subsequently causing experts to decide that "the Murray thesis had to be stopped once and for all".

=== Literature ===
Simpson noted that the publication of the Murray thesis in the Encyclopædia Britannica made it accessible to "journalists, film-makers popular novelists and thriller writers", who adopted it "enthusiastically". It influenced the work of Aldous Huxley and Robert Graves.

=== Influence on occultism and contemporary Paganism ===
The Murrayite thesis provided the blueprint for the contemporary Pagan religion of Wicca.

In the 1950s, several British occultists wrote that they had found remnants of the surviving Witch Cult. The first of these was Gerald Gardner, who said he had discovered a coven of such witches - the New Forest Coven, in 1939. Gardner said that he was concerned that the religion would die out, and so initiated more members into it through his Bricket Wood coven. The tradition that he started became Gardnerian Wicca. The New Forest witch Sybil Leek made a similar assertion, stating that she followed the religion as many of her family had previously done, and a similar statement came from the Australian artist Rosaleen Norton, whose family had been of Welsh origin. Charles Cardell also asserted a hereditary lineage of the witch-cult, and he posited that the horned deity of the witches was known as Atho. Other Britons soon made statements that they were members of a long line of family Witches. Robert Cochrane did so, and ran a coven called the Clan of Tubal Cain; he inspired the founding of several movements, including the 1734 Tradition. Alex Sanders also made such a statement, and founded Alexandrian Wicca; however, Sanders turned out to be a Gardnerian initiate and had based Alexandrian ritual on Gardnerian Wicca. In 1974, E. W. Lidell said that the occultist Aleister Crowley had been initiated into the witch-cult in 1899 or 1900, after being introduced to it through Allan Bennett, a Golden Dawn friend of his. Lidell continued by saying that the coven's High Priestess expelled Crowley for being "a dirty minded, evilly disposed, vicious little monster". No substantiating evidence has, however, been produced for this.

=== Carlo Ginzburg and the benandanti ===
From the 1960s Carlo Ginzburg documented the beliefs of a number of early modern groups of sorcerers, seers and healers. He wrote they were rooted in pre-Christian paganism, and credited Murray with a "correct intuition" in identifying the remnants of a pre-Christian 'religion of Diana', and in believing that witch-trial testimonies did at times represent actual or perceived experiences.

In the original Italian preface to I benandanti, published in 1966, Ginzburg discussed the work of Murray, writing that although it contained "a kernel of truth", it had been "formulated in a wholly uncritical way", containing "serious defects". With the complete academic rejection of Murray's theories in the 1970s, Ginzburg attempted to clarify his work's relationship to Murray's Witch-Cult theory in his "Preface to the English Edition", written in 1982. Here, he expressly stated that "Murray, in fact, asserted: (a) that witchcraft had its roots in an ancient fertility cult, and (b) that the sabbat described in the witchcraft trials referred to gatherings which had actually taken place. What my work really demonstrated, even if unintentionally, was simply the first point." He added that although he rejected her ideas, there was a "kernel of truth" in Murray's thesis.

Some historians have viewed Ginzburg's ideas as being related to Murray's; Hungarian historian Gábor Klaniczay stated that "Ginzburg reformulated Murray's often fantastic and very inadequately documented thesis about the reality of the witches' Sabbath" and thus the publication of I Benandanti in 1966 "reopened the debate about the possible interconnections between witchcraft beliefs and the survival of pagan fertility cults". Similarly, Romanian historian of religion Mircea Eliade commented that while Ginzburg's presentation of the benandanti "does not substantiate Murray's entire thesis", it did represent a "well-documented case of the processus through which a popular and archaic secret cult of fertility is transformed into a merely magical, or even black-magical practice under the pressure of the Inquisition." Historian of witchcraft Michael D. Bailey suggested that Ginzburg's work "somewhat revived" Murray's "discredited notion of witchcraft representing an ancient fertility religion".

Conversely, other scholars drew a clear divide between the ideas of Murray and Ginzburg; in 1975, Cohn stated that Ginzburg's discovery had "nothing to do" with Murray's witch-cult hypothesis. Echoing these views, in 1999 English historian Ronald Hutton stated that Ginzburg's ideas regarding shamanistic fertility cults were actually "pretty much the opposite" of what Murray had posited. Hutton pointed out that Ginzburg's argument that "ancient dream-worlds, or operations on non-material planes of consciousness, helped to create a new set of fantasies at the end of the Middle Ages" differed strongly from Murray's argument that an organised religion of witches had survived from the pre-Christian era and that descriptions of witches' sabbaths were accounts of real events. The folklorist Juliette Wood stated that while Ginzburg articulated a "more sympathetic" stance to Murray's ideas than other specialists in the witch trials, he "does not propose anything approaching the pan-European cult which Murray advocated".

=== Sabina Magliocco and ostension ===
In 2002 Sabina Magliocco theorized a middle way between Hutton's idea that pre-Christian elements in witchcraft were only legends, dreams or trance experiences and Murray's idea that there was an organized pagan witches' society, by stating that although being diffused as legends, witchcraft beliefs, as all the legends, "occasionally become dramatic enactments known as 'ostension'".

Ostension, according to Magliocco, "always derives from a pre-existing legend, the legend precedes the existence of its enactment, therefore even if a group decided to enact aspects of the legend of Diana/ Herodias, it would not have been a revival of pre-Christian paganism, but an attempt to act out certain ritual aspects described in the legends. Moreover, the more magical aspects from the trial reports—night flights on the backs of animals, ever-replenishing banquets, resurrection of dead livestock—could not have been achieved through ostension. We need to consider these as fantastical legend motifs, reports of experiences from trances or dreams, or both".

Furthermore, Magliocco specifies that the accused of witchcraft who reported pagan themes such as the Society of Diana and Herodias "constituted only a small minority of all those accused of witchcraft".

By taking the example of two women condemned as witches in Milan in 1390, Sibillia Zanni and Pierina de' Bugatis, she states that, even though "we have no proof such a society ever existed, it is not inconceivable that a few inspired individuals might have decided to dramatize, once or repeatedly, the gatherings described in legends" in Medieval and Early Modern Europe. A gathering based on legends of Diana and/or Herodias "would probably have been secret and limited to the friends and associates of the creative instigators, who might well have been folk healers. One or more women might even have played the role of Diana or Herodias, presiding over the gathering and giving advice. Feasting, drinking and dancing might have taken place, and the women may have exchanged advice on matters of healing and divination".

== See also ==
- Cult of Herodias
- History of Wicca
