= Aradia, or the Gospel of the Witches =

1899 book by Charles Godfrey Leland

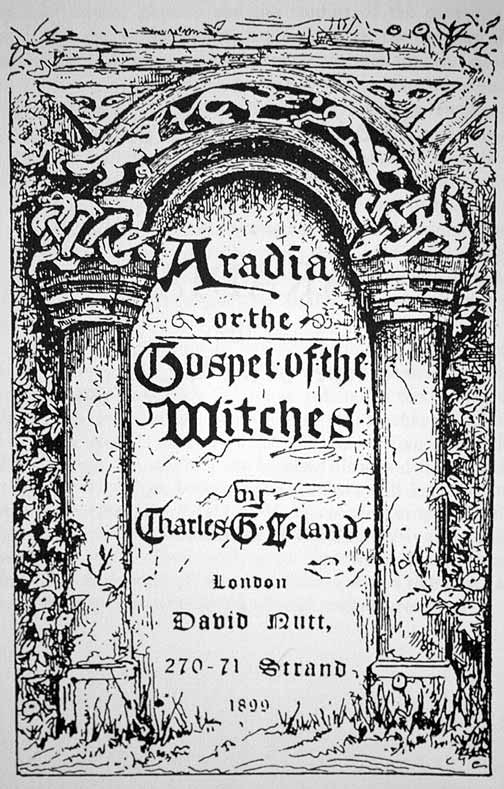
- Title page of the original 1899 edition
- Author: Charles Godfrey Leland
- Language: English
- Genre: Folklore, Witchcraft
- Published: 1899 (David Nutt)
- Publication place: United Kingdom

Aradia, or the Gospel of the Witches is a book by the American folklorist Charles Godfrey Leland that was published in 1899. It contains what he believed was the religious text of a group of pagan witches in Tuscany, Italy, that documented their beliefs and rituals. Historians and folklorists have disputed the existence of such a group. During the 20th century, the book was influential in the development of the contemporary Pagan religion of Wicca.

== Overview ==
The text is a composite. Some of it is Leland's translation into English of an original Italian manuscript, the Vangelo (gospel). Leland reported receiving the manuscript from his primary informant on Italian witchcraft beliefs, a woman Leland referred to as "Maddalena" and whom he called his "witch informant" in Italy. The rest of the material comes from Leland's research on Italian folklore and traditions, including other related material from Maddalena. Leland had been informed of the Vangelo's existence in 1886, but it took Maddalena eleven years to provide him with a copy. After translating and editing the material, it took another two years for the book to be published. Its fifteen chapters portray the origins, beliefs, rituals, and spells of an Italian pagan witchcraft tradition. The central figure of that religion is the goddess Aradia, who came to Earth to teach the practice of witchcraft to peasants in order for them to oppose their feudal oppressors and the Roman Catholic Church.

Leland's work remained obscure until the 1950s, when other theories about, and claims of, "pagan witchcraft" survivals began to be widely discussed. Aradia began to be examined within the wider context of such claims. Scholars are divided, with some dismissing Leland's assertion regarding the origins of the manuscript, and others arguing for its authenticity as a unique documentation of folk beliefs. Along with increased scholarly attention, Aradia came to play a special role in the history of Gardnerian Wicca and its offshoots, being used as evidence that pagan witchcraft survivals existed in Europe, and because a passage from the book's first chapter was used as a part of the religion's liturgy. After the increase in interest in the text, it became widely available through numerous reprints from a variety of publishers, including a 1999 critical edition with a new translation by Mario and Dina Pazzaglini.

== Origins ==
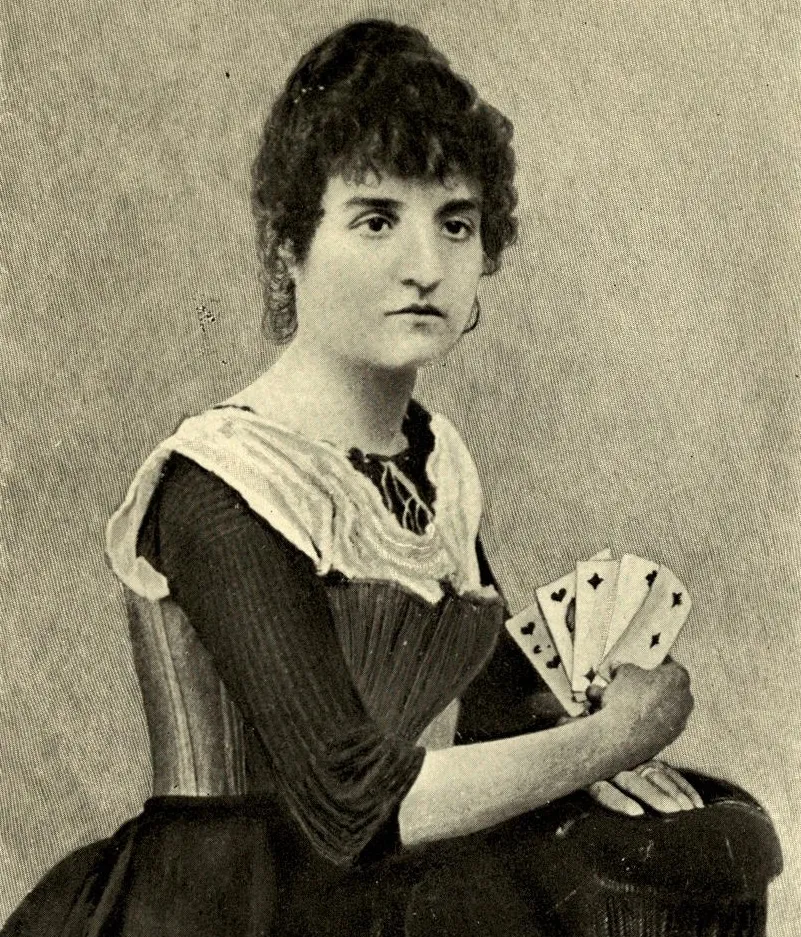
Maddalena as seen in Elizabeth Robins Pennell's 1906 biography of C.G. Leland

Charles Godfrey Leland was an American author and folklorist, and spent much of the 1890s in Florence researching Italian folklore. Aradia was one of the products of Leland's research. While Leland's name is the one principally associated with Aradia, the manuscript that makes up the bulk of it is attributed to the research of an Italian woman whom Leland and Leland's biographer, his niece Elizabeth Robins Pennell, referred to as "Maddalena". According to folklorist Roma Lister, a contemporary and friend of Leland's, Maddalena's real name was Margherita, and she was a "witch" from Florence who claimed a family lineage from the Etruscans and knowledge of ancient rituals. Professor Robert Mathiesen, as a contributor to the Pazzaglini translation of Aradia, mentions a letter from Maddalena to Leland, which he states is signed "Maddalena Talenti" (the last name being a guess, as the handwriting is difficult to decipher).

Leland reports meeting Maddalena in 1886, and she became the primary source for his Italian folklore collecting for several years. Leland describes her as belonging to a vanishing tradition of sorcery. He writes that "by long practice [she] has perfectly learned ... just what I want, and how to extract it from those of her kind." He received several hundred pages worth of material from her, which was incorporated into his books Etruscan Roman Remains in Popular Tradition, Legends of Florence Collected From the People, and eventually Aradia. Leland wrote that he had "learned that there was in existence a manuscript setting forth the doctrines of Italian witchcraft" in 1886, and had urged Maddalena to find it. Eleven years later, on 1 January 1897, Leland received the Vangelo by post. The manuscript was written in Maddalena's handwriting. Leland understood it to be an authentic document of the "Old Religion" of the witches, but explains that he did not know if the text came from written or oral sources.

Leland's translation and editing was completed in early 1897 and submitted to David Nutt for publication. Two years passed, until Leland wrote requesting the return of the manuscript in order to submit it to a different publishing house. This request spurred Nutt to accept the book, and it was published in autumn 1899. Wiccan author Raymond Buckland claims to have been the first to reprint the book in 1968 through his "Buckland Museum of Witchcraft" press, but a British reprint was made by "Wiccens" [sic] Charles "Rex Nemorensis" and Mary Cardell in the early 1960s. Since then the text has been repeatedly reprinted by a variety of different publishers, including as a 1998 retranslation by Mario and Dina Pazzaglini with essays and commentary.

== Contents ==
After the eleven-year search, Leland writes that he was unsurprised by the contents of the Vangelo. It was largely what he was expecting, with the exception that he did not predict passages in "prose-poetry". "I also believe that in this Gospel of the Witches", comments Leland in the appendix, "we have a trustworthy outline at least of the doctrine and rites observed at [the witches' Sabbat]. They adored forbidden deities and practised forbidden deeds, inspired as much by rebellion against Society as by their own passions."

Leland's final draft was a slim volume. He organised the material to be included into fifteen chapters, and added a brief preface and an appendix. The published version also included footnotes and, in many places, the original Italian that Leland had translated. Most of the content of Leland's Aradia is made up of spells, blessings, and rituals, but the text also contains stories and myths which suggest influences from both the ancient Roman religion and Roman Catholicism. Major characters in the myths include the Roman goddess Diana, a sun god called Lucifer, the Biblical Cain as a lunar figure, and the messianic Aradia. The witchcraft of "The Gospel of the Witches" is both a method for casting spells and an anti-hierarchical "counter-religion" to the Catholic church.

=== Themes ===
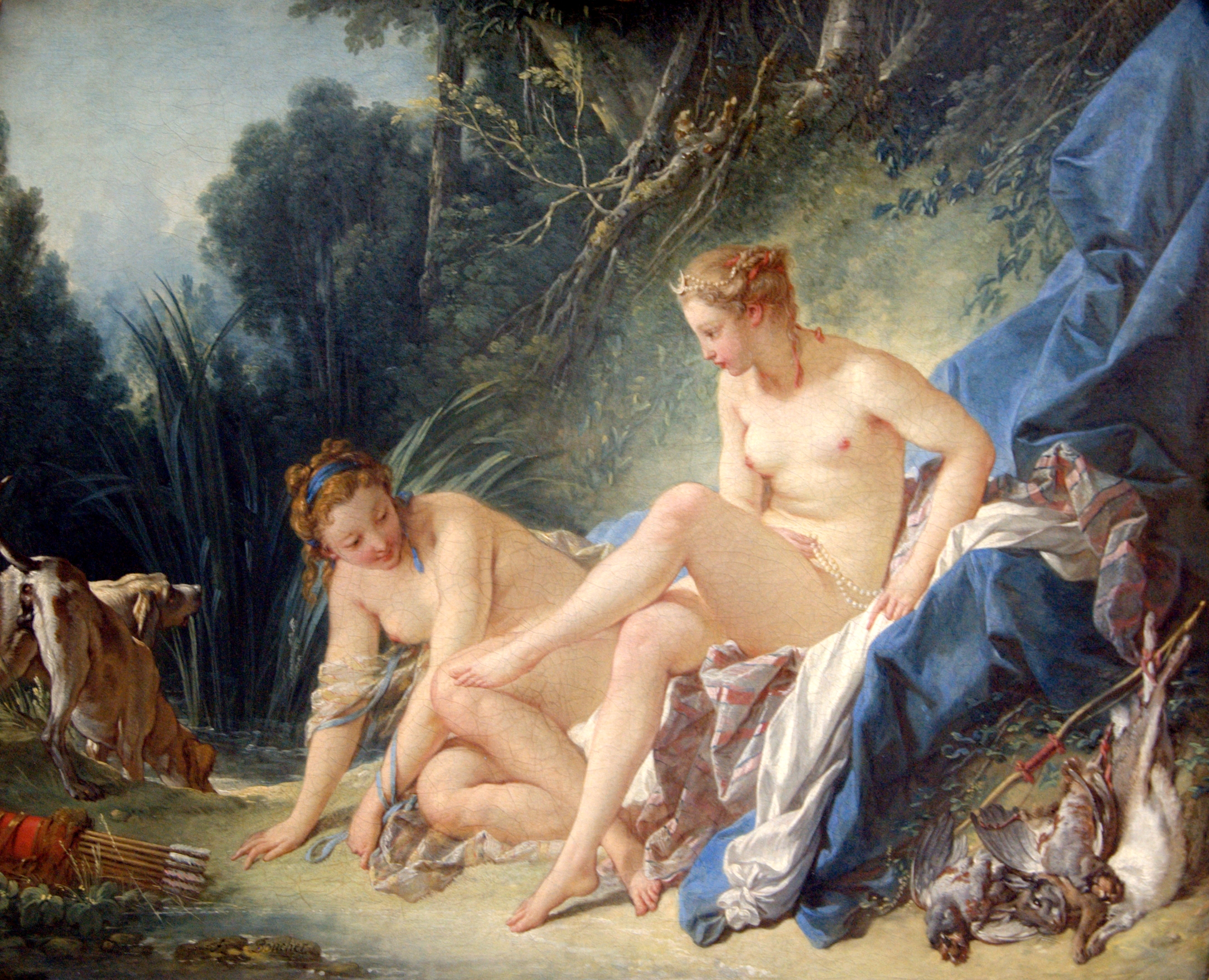
François Boucher's Diana Leaving Her Bath. The goddess is wearing a crescent moon crown.

Entire chapters of Aradia are devoted to rituals and magic spells. These include enchantments to win love (Chapter VI), a conjuration to perform when finding a stone with a hole or a round stone in order to turn it into an amulet for Diana's favour (Chapter IV), and the consecration of a ritual feast for Diana, Aradia, and Cain (Chapter II). The narrative material makes up less of the text, and is composed of short stories and legends about the birth of the witchcraft religion and the actions of their gods. Leland summarises the mythic material in the book in its appendix, writing "Diana is Queen of the Witches; an associate of Herodias (Aradia) in her relations to sorcery; that she bore a child to her brother the Sun (here Lucifer); that as a moon-goddess she is in some relation to Cain, who dwells as prisoner in the moon, and that the witches of old were people oppressed by feudal lands, the former revenging themselves in every way, and holding orgies to Diana which the Church represented as being the worship of Satan". Diana is not only the witches' goddess, but is presented as the primordial creatrix in Chapter III, dividing herself into darkness and light. After giving birth to Lucifer, Diana seduces him while in the form of a cat, eventually giving birth to Aradia, their daughter. Diana demonstrates the power of her witchcraft by creating "the heavens, the stars and the rain", becoming "Queen of the Witches". Chapter I presents the original witches as slaves that escaped from their masters, beginning new lives as "thieves and evil folk". Diana sends her daughter Aradia to them to teach these former serfs witchcraft, the power of which they can use to "destroy the evil race (of oppressors)". Aradia's students thus became the first witches, who would then continue the worship of Diana. Leland was struck by this cosmogony: "In all other Scriptures of all races, it is the male ... who creates the universe; in Witch Sorcery it is the female who is the primitive principle".

=== Structure ===
Aradia is composed of fifteen chapters, the first ten of which are presented as being Leland's translation of the Vangelo manuscript given to him by Maddalena. This section, while predominantly made up of spells and rituals, is also the source of most of the myths and folktales contained in the text. At the end of Chapter I is the text in which Aradia gives instructions to her followers on how to practice witchcraft.

The first ten chapters are not entirely a direct translation of the Vangelo; Leland offers his own commentary and notes on a number of passages, and Chapter VII is Leland's incorporation of other Italian folklore material. Medievalist Robert Mathiesen contends that the Vangelo manuscript actually represents even less of Aradia, arguing that only Chapters I, II, and the first half of Chapter IV match Leland's description of the manuscript's contents, and suggests that the other material came from different texts collected by Leland through Maddalena.

The remaining five chapters are clearly identified in the text as representing other material Leland believed to be relevant to the Vangelo, acquired during his research into Italian witchcraft, and especially while working on his Etruscan Roman Remains and Legends of Florence. The themes in these additional chapters vary in some details from the first ten, and Leland included them partly to "[confirm] the fact that the worship of Diana existed for a long time contemporary with Christianity". Chapter XV, for example, gives an incantation to Laverna, through the use of a deck of playing cards. Leland explains its inclusion by a note that Diana, as portrayed in Aradia, is worshipped by outlaws, and Laverna was the Roman goddess of thievery. Other examples of Leland's thoughts about the text are given in the book's preface, appendix, and numerous footnotes.

In several places Leland provides the Italian he was translating. According to Mario Pazzaglini, author of the 1999 translation, the Italian contains misspellings, missing words, and grammatical errors, and is in a standardised Italian rather than the local dialect one might expect. Pazzaglini concludes that Aradia represents material translated from dialect to basic Italian and then into English, creating a summary of texts, some of which were mis-recorded. Leland himself called the text a "collection of ceremonies, 'cantrips,' incantations, and traditions" and described it as an attempt to gather material, "valuable and curious remains of ancient Latin or Etruscan lore" that he feared would be lost. There is no cohesive narrative even in the sections that Leland attributes to the Vangelo. This lack of cohesion, or "inconsistency", is an argument for the text's authenticity, according to religious scholar Chas S. Clifton, since the text shows no signs of being "massaged ... for future book buyers."

== Controversy ==
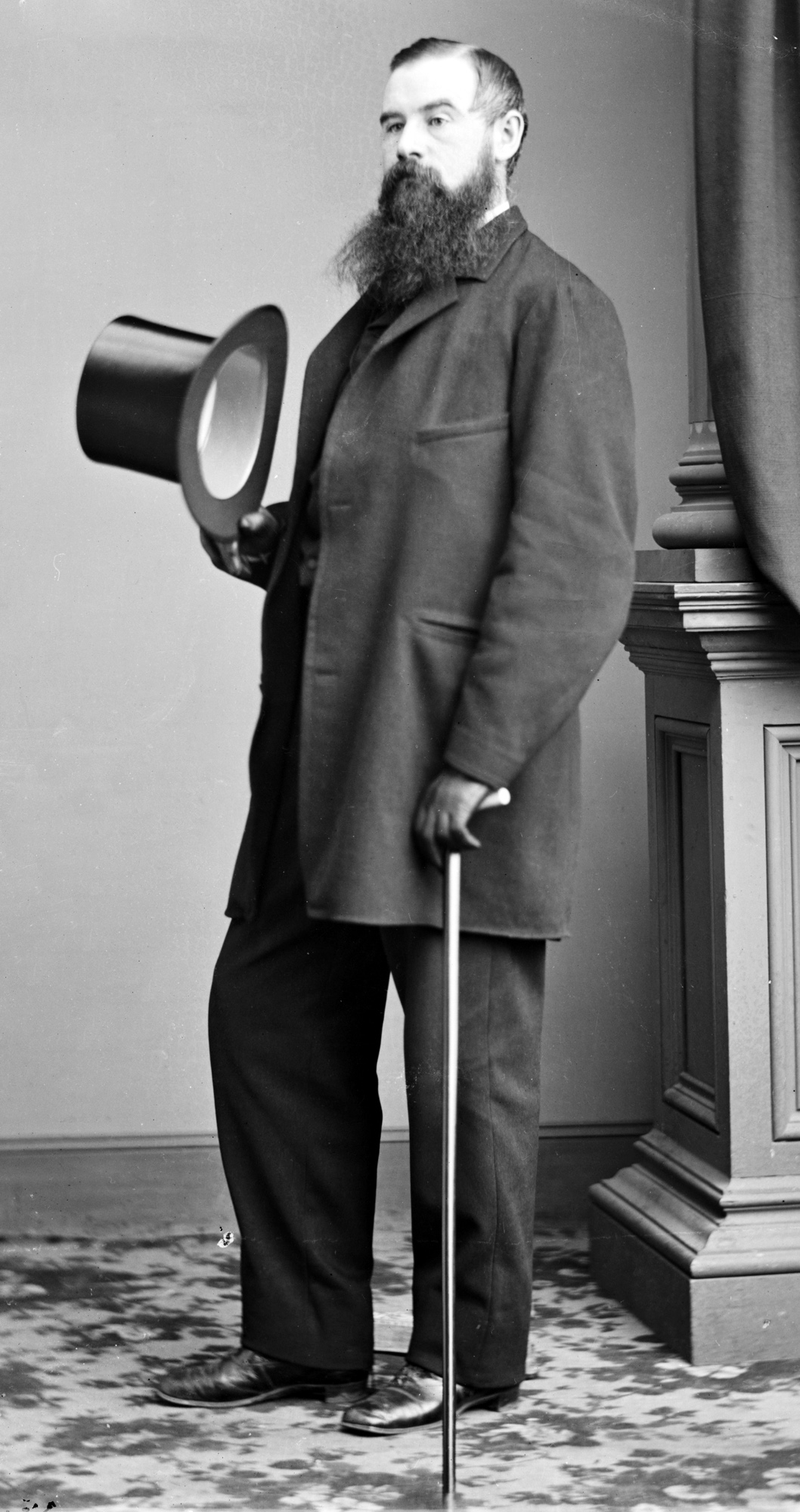
Charles Godfrey Leland wrote journalism, comedy and books on folklore and linguistics. Aradia has proved his most well-known and controversial work.

Leland wrote that "the witches even yet form a fragmentary secret society or sect, that they call it that of the Old Religion, and that there are in the Romagna entire villages in which the people are completely heathen". Accepting this, Leland supposed that "the existence of a religion supposes a Scripture, and in this case it may be admitted, almost without severe verification, that the Evangel of the Witches is really a very old work ... in all probability the translation of some early or later Latin work."

Leland's claims about the authorship and ultimate origins of the manuscript have been called into question. After the 1921 publication of Margaret Murray's The Witch-cult in Western Europe, which hypothesised that the European witch trials were actually a persecution of a pagan religious survival, American sensationalist author Theda Kenyon's 1929 book Witches Still Live connected Murray's thesis with the witchcraft religion in Aradia. Arguments against Murray's thesis would eventually include arguments against Leland. Witchcraft scholar Jeffrey Russell devoted some of his 1980 book A History of Witchcraft: Sorcerers, Heretics and Pagans to arguing against the claims in Aradia, Murray's thesis, and Jules Michelet's 1862 La Sorcière, which also theorised that witchcraft represented an underground religion. Historian Elliot Rose's A Razor for a Goat dismissed Aradia as a collection of incantations unsuccessfully attempting to portray a religion. In his Triumph of the Moon, historian Ronald Hutton summarises the controversy as having three possible extremes:

1. The Vangelo manuscript represents a genuine text from an otherwise undiscovered religion.
2. Maddalena wrote the text, either with or without Leland's assistance, possibly drawing from her own background with folklore or witchcraft.
3. The entire document was forged by Leland.

Hutton himself is a sceptic, not only of the existence of the religion that Aradia claims to represent, but also of the existence of Maddalena, arguing that it is more likely that Leland created the entire story than that Leland could be so easily "duped" by an Italian fortune-teller. In Triumph of the Moon, he notes the "current scholarly consensus that Aradia does not describe a genuine Italian witch religion".

Clifton takes exception to Hutton's position, writing that it amounts to an accusation of "serious literary fraud" made by an "argument from absence"; one of Hutton's main objections is that Aradia is unlike anything found in medieval literature.

Mathiesen also dismisses the third option, arguing that while Leland's English drafts for the book were heavily edited and revised in the process of writing, the Italian sections, in contrast, were almost untouched except for corrections of "precisely the sort that a proofreader would make as he compared his copy to the original". Mathiesen concluded that Leland was working from an extant Italian-language original that he described as "authentic, but not representative" of any larger folk tradition.

Cultural historian A.D. Manns has theorized that Leland could have passed on Maddalena's original manuscript to his close friend, fellow Florence resident and folklore collector James Wood Brown. In his book, Florence: past and present, Brown wrote that Leland had given him several manuscripts and texts, some of which originated with “Florentine” and “Tuscan” witches.

Anthropologist Sabina Magliocco examined the first option (that Leland's manuscript represented a folk tradition involving Diana and the Cult of Herodias), stated in her article "Who Was Aradia? The History and Development of a Legend". Magliocco wrote that the text "may represent a 19th-century version of [the legend of the Cult of Herodias] that incorporated later materials influenced by medieval diabolism: the presence of 'Lucifero,' the Christian devil; the practice of sorcery; the naked dances under the full moon."

== Influence on Wicca and Stregheria ==
Magliocco calls Aradia "the first real text of the 20th-century Witchcraft revival", and it is repeatedly cited as being profoundly influential on the development of Wicca. The text apparently corroborates the thesis of Margaret Murray that early modern and Renaissance witchcraft represented a survival of ancient pagan beliefs, and after Gerald Gardner's claim to have encountered religious witchcraft in 20th-century England, the works of Michelet, Murray, and Leland helped support at least the possibility that such a survival could exist.

The Charge of the Goddess, an important piece of liturgy used in Wiccan rituals, was inspired by Aradia's speech in the first chapter of the book. Parts of the speech appeared in an early version of Gardnerian Wicca ritual. According to Doreen Valiente, one of Gardner's priestesses, Gardner was surprised by Valiente's recognising the material as having come from Leland's book. Valiente subsequently rewrote the passage in both prose and verse, retaining the "traditional" Aradia lines. Some Wiccan traditions use the name Aradia, or Diana, to refer to the Goddess or Queen of the Witches, and Hutton writes that the earliest Gardnerian rituals used the name Airdia, a "garbled" form of Aradia. Hutton further suggests that the reason that Wicca includes skyclad practice, or ritual nudity, is because of a line spoken by Aradia:

And as the sign that ye are truly free,
Ye shall be naked in your rites, both men
And women also: this shall last until
The last of your oppressors shall be dead;

Accepting Aradia as the source of this practice, Robert Chartowich points to the 1998 Pazzaglini translation of these lines, which read "Men and Women / You will all be naked, until / Yet he shall be dead, the last / Of your oppressors is dead." Chartowich argues that the ritual nudity of Wicca was based upon Leland's mistranslation of these lines by incorporating the clause "in your rites". There are, however, earlier mentions of ritual nudity among Italian witches. Historian Ruth Martin states that it was a common practice for witches of Italy to be "naked with their hair loose around their shoulders" while reciting conjurations. Jeffrey Burton Russell notes that "A woman named Marta was tortured in Florence about 1375: she was alleged to have placed candles round a dish and to have taken off her clothes and stood above the dish in the nude, making magical signs". Historian Franco Mormando refers to an Italian witch: "Lo and behold: in the first hours of sleep, this woman opens the door to her vegetable garden and comes out completely naked and her hair all undone, and she begins to do and say her various signs and conjurations ...".

The reception of Aradia amongst Neopagans has not been entirely positive. Clifton suggests that modern claims of revealing an Italian pagan witchcraft tradition, for example those of Leo Martello and Raven Grimassi, must be "match[ed] against", and compared with the claims in Aradia. He further suggests that a lack of comfort with Aradia may be due to an "insecurity" within Neopaganism about the movement's claim to authenticity as a religious revival. Valiente offers another explanation for the negative reaction of some neopagans; that the identification of Lucifer as the God of the witches in Aradia was "too strong meat" for Wiccans who were used to the gentler, romantic paganism of Gerald Gardner and were especially quick to reject any relationship between witchcraft and Satanism.

Clifton writes that Aradia was especially influential for leaders of the Wiccan religious movement in the 1950s and 1960s, but that the book no longer appears on the "reading lists" given by members to newcomers, nor is it extensively cited in more recent Neopagan books. The new translation of the book released in 1998 was introduced by Wiccan author Stewart Farrar, who affirms the importance of Aradia, writing that "Leland's gifted research into a 'dying' tradition has made a significant contribution to a living and growing one."

Author Raven Grimassi has written extensively about Aradia in his popularization of Stregheria, presenting what he admits is his own personal rendering of her story. He differs from Leland in many ways, particularly in portraying her as a witch who lived and taught in 14th-century Italy, rather than a goddess. In response to Clifton, he states that similarity or dissimilarity to Leland's Aradia material cannot be a measure of authenticity, since Leland's material itself is disputed.

Therefore it cannot effectively be used to discredit other writings or views on Italian witchcraft, nor is it a representative ethnographic foundation against which other writings or views "must" be compared. The Aradia material is, unfortunately, a disputed text with problems of its own when compared to the usually accepted folklore, folk traditions, and folk magic practices of Italy.

He agrees with Valiente that the major objection of Neopagans to this material is its "inclusion of negative stereotypes related to witches and witchcraft", and suggests that comparisons between this material and religious witchcraft are "regarded as an insult by many neo-pagans".

== Influence on culture ==
=== Classical music ===
The Norwegian classical composer Martin Romberg wrote a Mass for mixed choir in seven parts after a selection of poems from Leland's text. This Witch Mass was premiered at the Vestfold International Festival in 2012 with Grex Vocalis. In order to create the right atmosphere for the music, the festival blocked off an entire road tunnel in Tønsberg to use it as a venue. The work was released on CD through Lawo Classics in 2014.

== See also ==
- Roma Lister, Italian folklore assistant of C.G. Leland
- Etruscan mythology
- Tages, a prophet of Etruscan religion
- Vegoia, a prophet of Etruscan religion
- Usil, Etruscan sun god
