= Roma Lister =

English writer

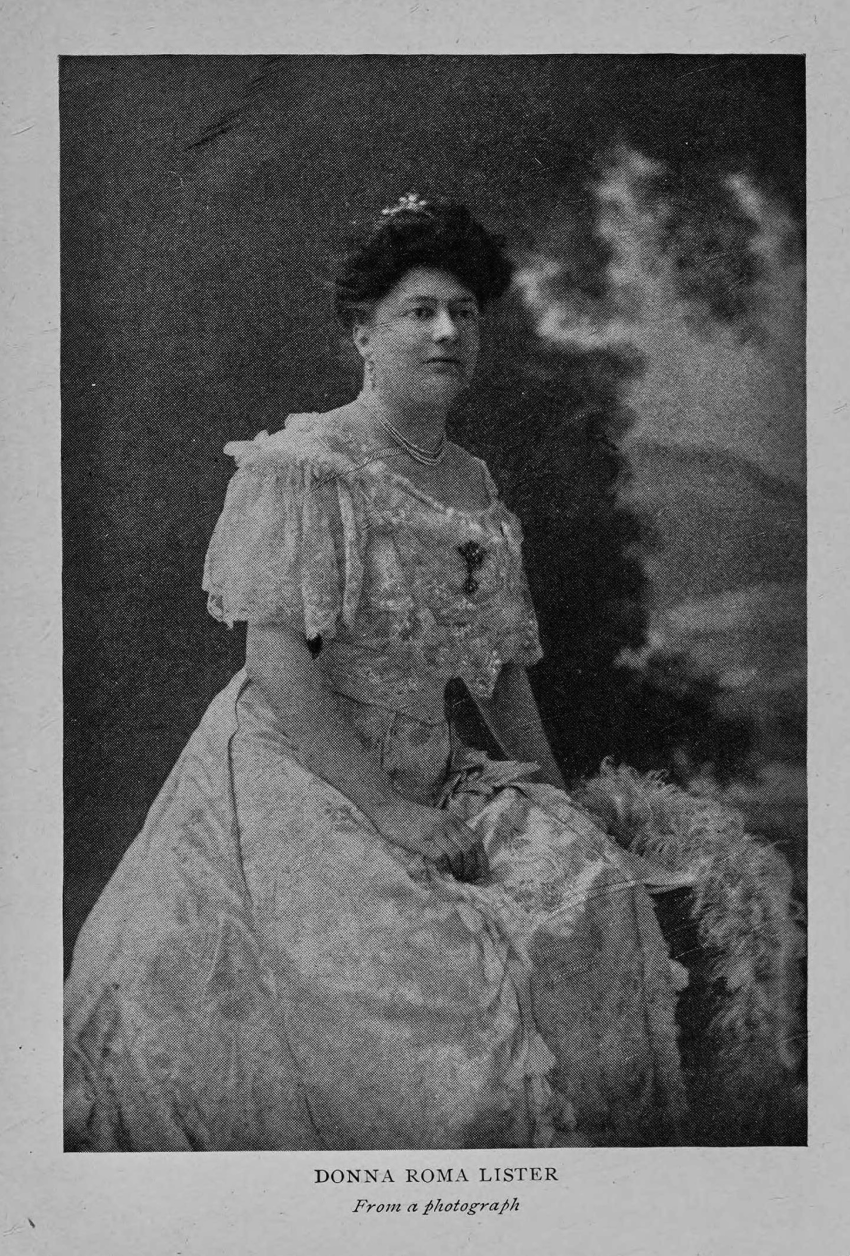
- Roma Lister, c. 1918

Roma Lister was a folklorist, medium, and occult writer who was mostly active in the early 20th century. Her literary associates and spiritual collaborators included a number of widely published journalists, including Charles G. Leland, Lilian Whiting, and W.T. Stead.

A close friend and research partner of Leland in the 1890s, she has been cited as a possible co-author of or contributor to Aradia, or the Gospel of the Witches, an apocryphal scripture of Italian witchcraft. Lister personally practiced automatic writing during this period and claimed to have produced various spiritual manifestations.

In her memoirs, Reminiscences: Social and Political (1926) and Further Reminiscences: Occult and Social (1927), she wrote extensively about her encounters with mediumistic phenomena, ghostlore, and witchcraft.

Arild Rosenkrantz, the noted Danish painter and Anthroposophist, was her first cousin.
