= Stregheria =

Italian-American neopagan tradition

Stregheria (Italian pronunciation: [streɡeˈriːa]) is a neo-pagan tradition similar to Wicca, with Italian and Italian American origins. While most practitioners consider Stregheria to be a distinct tradition from Wicca, some academics consider it to be a form of Wicca or an offshoot. Both have similar beliefs and practices. For example, Stregheria honors a pantheon centered on a Moon Goddess and a Horned God, similar to Wiccan views of divinity.

Author Raven Grimassi has written on the topic. Grimassi taught what he called the Aradian tradition from 1980. He discusses elements of 'Italian witchcraft' adopted by Gardnerian Wicca with ideas inspired by Charles G. Leland's Aradia, or the Gospel of the Witches (1899). The name "Aradia" (a version of Herodias) is due to Leland, who claimed she was venerated by a "witch-cult" in medieval Tuscany.

== Names ==
The word stregheria is an archaic Italian word for "witchcraft", the most used word in modern Italian being stregoneria. Stregheria is sometimes referred to as la Vecchia Religione ("the Old Religion").

== Raven Grimassi ==
Raven Grimassi is the pen name of an Italian-American author, born in 1951 as the son of an Italian immigrant who was born and raised in the area of Naples, Italy. He became involved with a coven presenting itself as Gardnerian Wicca in 1969 in San Diego. He is the founder of the Aridian and Arician traditions of Italian-based witchcraft. He stepped down as the directing elder of Arician Witchcraft in 2004. As of 2009, Grimassi lived in Massachusetts and is the directing elder of the Ash, Birch and Willow tradition, and co-director of the Fellowship of the Pentacle. He was formerly co-director of the College of the Crossroads. He died in 2019.

His later interest in Neo-paganism began in 1969, and he was initiated into a system claiming to be Gardnerian Wicca in San Diego though the tradition's claim eventually proved to be false. Ten years later, Grimassi began teaching the "Aridian Tradition", which he describes as a "modern system"^{[1]} of Italian Witchcraft or Stregheria, that he created for non-initiates. Grimassi also studied Kabbalah and other traditions of Wicca such as Brittic and the Pictish-Gaelic system in which he received third degree initiation in 1983 according to the Encyclopedia of Wicca & Witchcraft.

=== Views on a historical "religion of witchcraft" ===
Grimassi shares in common, in his books, the general "Witch-cult hypothesis" that appears in the writings of Charles G. Leland (Aradia, or the Gospel of the Witches, 1899), a discredited theory that European witchcraft was the continuation of an ancient pre-Christian religion.

Grimassi describes the roots of Stregheria as a syncretic offshoot of Etruscan religion that later blended with "Tuscan peasant religion", medieval Christian heresy, and veneration of saints.

Grimassi views Leland's book Aradia, or the Gospel of the Witches as a "Christianized and distorted version" of the original story of Aradia, whom he believes to be a mortal woman named Aradia di Toscano. However, Grimassi does endorse a number of elements from Leland's Aradia material, such as the inclusion of a full moon ritual and a sacred meal at the Tregenda, or Sabbat, along with the pantheon of a goddess and god figure.

Grimassi writes that Aradia di Toscano passed on a religion of witchcraft, based on ancient Etruscan paganism, to her followers (whom Grimassi calls "The Triad Clans"). The Triad Clans are referred to as "an alliance of three related Witch Clans known as the Tanarra, Janarra, and Fanarra".

=== Claims of family tradition ===
Reports that Grimassi claims to belong to a "family tradition" of religious witchcraft has attracted criticism. Grimassi responds by saying that, although he wrote about such a family tradition, he intentionally never specifically mentions his own family in his books, but that Llewellyn's marketing department designed text depicting him as being raised in a family tradition . Grimassi does not deny being the bearer of a family lineage but chooses to protect the privacy of his family by not mentioning or referencing specific members (hence his use of a pseudonym).

Sabina Magliocco, who has criticized some of Grimassi's claims, does point out that "Grimassi never claims to be reproducing exactly what was practiced by Italian immigrants to North America; he admits Italian-American immigrants "have adapted a few Wiccan elements into their ways". After personally meeting Grimassi, Magliocco writes in her letter to the Pomegranate Reader's Forum:

I had the pleasure of meeting Raven Grimassi during the summer of 2001, unfortunately after the final draft of my article had already been submitted to The Pom. He was very gracious and helpful to me. From information he revealed during our interview, I can say with reasonable certainty that I believe him to have been initiated into a domestic tradition of folk magic and healing such as I describe in my article.

Grimassi's tradition centers around a duotheistic pair of deities that are regarded as divine lovers, and they may go by many different names, including: Uni and Tagni, Tana and Tanus, Diana and Dianus, Jana and Janus, and more.

According to Grimassi some Stregheria rituals take place in a circle, with an altar facing North. Ritual actions include prayer, and the blessing of food.

In comparing Stregheria to Wicca, Grimassi notes both similarities between the two and differences. He has defended his material as being significantly different from Wicca at the roots level, and asserts that many of the foundational concepts in Gerald Gardner's Wicca can be found earlier in works on Italian Witchcraft and ancient Mediterranean mystery sects.

== Academics ==
Some academics, such as Ethan Doyle White, consider Stregheria to be an offshoot of Wicca. Professor of anthropology and religion Sabina Magliocco has described Stregheria as "a religion similar to Wicca in structure and practice, with Italian flavor added through the names of deities, spirits, and sabbats."

Recent ethnographic work has also highlighted enduring indigenous healing traditions in Italy that operate alongside or within Stregheria, notably the practice of Segnature, a folk healing system based on sacred gestures (segnature), prayers, and secret formulas. According to Dr. Angela Puca, these vernacular practices—performed by Segnatori—represent a living form of Italian shamanism deeply embedded within rural communities. They blend pre‑Christian folk beliefs with Catholic symbolism and continue to be transmitted through familial or community lineages, often in secrecy, with renewed visibility via social media networks. Puca’s research emphasises the coexistence and syncretism of these healing traditions with contemporary strands of Stregheria, where some practitioners integrate Segnature into their repertoire or draw upon similar gestures and verbal formulas. While Stregheria in its modern form often looks to reconstructionist and neopagan sources (such as Etruscan, Roman, or medieval witchcraft traditions), Segnature demonstrates the survival of distinct local traditions rooted in folk medicine and spiritual healing, marking an important example of indigenous Italian magical practice.

== See also ==
- Witches of Benevento – Medieval legend
- European witchcraft – Belief in witchcraft in Europe
- Neopaganism in the United States – Modern paganism within America
- Etruscan mythology
- Tages – Etruscan prophet
- Vegoia – Etruscan mythology's character

== Sources ==
- Sabina Magliocco, "Italian American Stregheria and Wicca: Ethnic Ambivalence in American Neopaganism," in Modern Paganism in World Cultures: Comparative Perspectives, ed. Michael Strmiska (Santa Barbara, CA: ABC-CLIO, 2006), 55–86.
