= Richard Fanning Loper =

American shipbuilder

Richard Fanning Loper (February 3, 1800 - November 8, 1880) was a captain, merchant, inventor, and shipbuilder in Philadelphia, Pennsylvania. He had a coastal shipping business. He also got into ship building, racing, and supplied the U.S. government with ships.

== Early life ==
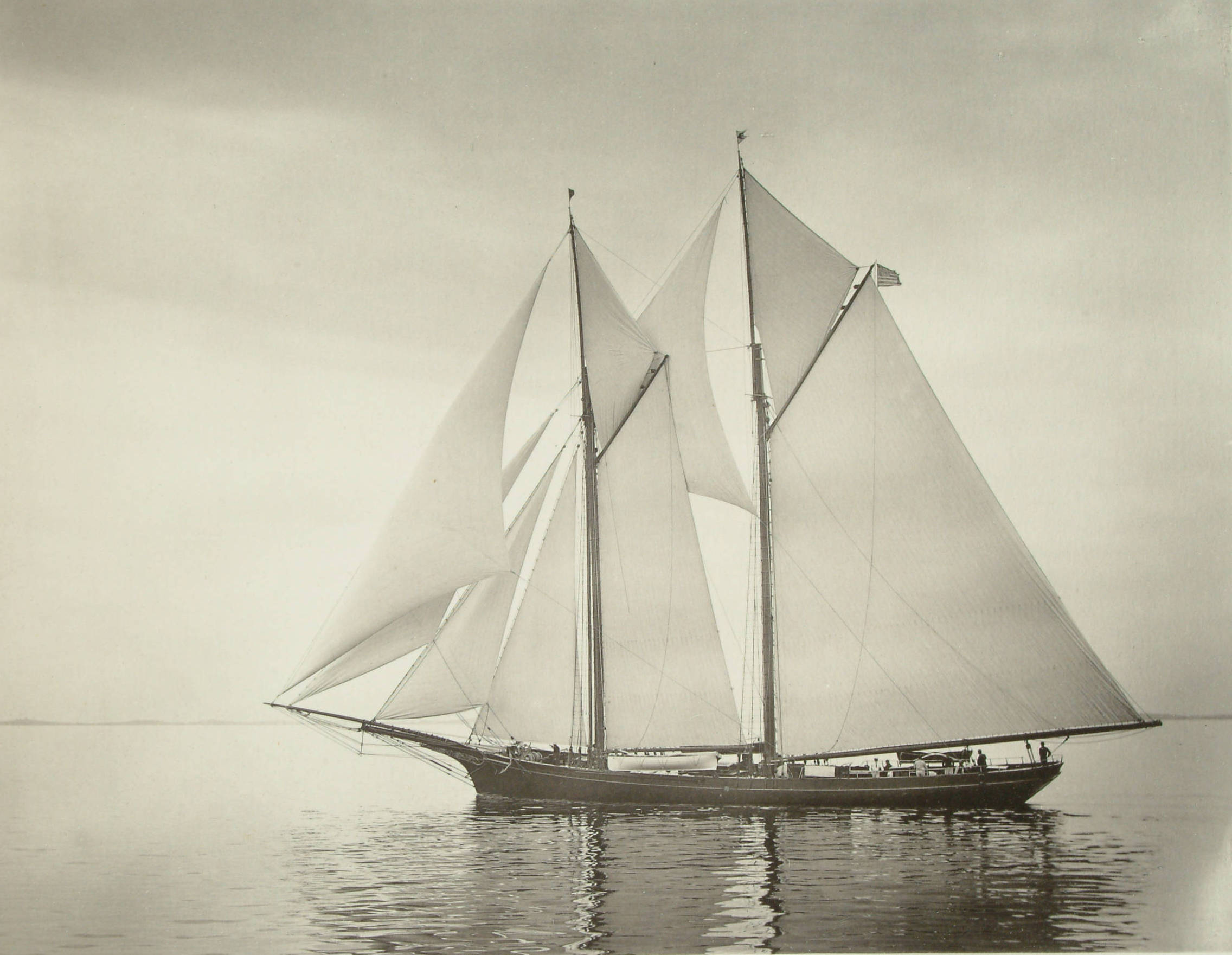
Mohican

Loper was born in Stonington, Connecticut. He sailed on coastal trips and became a master mariner at age 15. He captained the schooner Nancy Cobband was second mate on the sloop Hero exploration of Antarctica.

== Business career ==
He settled in Philadelphia and established a packet ship business between that city and Hartford, Connecticut. He married Margaret Mercer Baird.

Thomas Sidney Jesup corresponded with him in 1847 regarding proposal to build a ship.

During the civil war, Loper wrote a detailed defense of his actions after reports and U.S. senate committee hearings that included accusations of profiteering off the government.

== Legacy ==
Theda Kenyon's novel The Skipper from Stonington (1947) is based on the life of Richard Fanning Loper. The Library of Congress has a collection of his and his family's papers.

== See also ==
- Magic (yacht)
