= Hexenkartothek =

Nazi investigation into witch trials

The Hexenkartothek (known as the "H-special order" project) was an investigation into witch trials led by SS-Untersturmführer Rudolf Levin under the orders of Heinrich Himmler.

Himmler organised a team of SS researchers to collect historical records of witch trials with the goal of proving that the Catholic Church had used the trials to eliminate the German heritage. This prompted William Monter to dub the Nazi regime "Europe's first 'pro-witch' government." One pamphlet, 1935's The Christian Witch-Craze, claimed that the witch-hunts were an attempt to exterminate Aryan womanhood.

According to Himmler, the information gathered during the nine-year investigation was to be assembled into a propaganda book. No book was produced and Levin's habilitation thesis was rejected by the Ludwig-Maximilians-Universität München in 1944.

== See also ==
- Witch-cult hypothesis
