= Theda Kenyon =

American writer

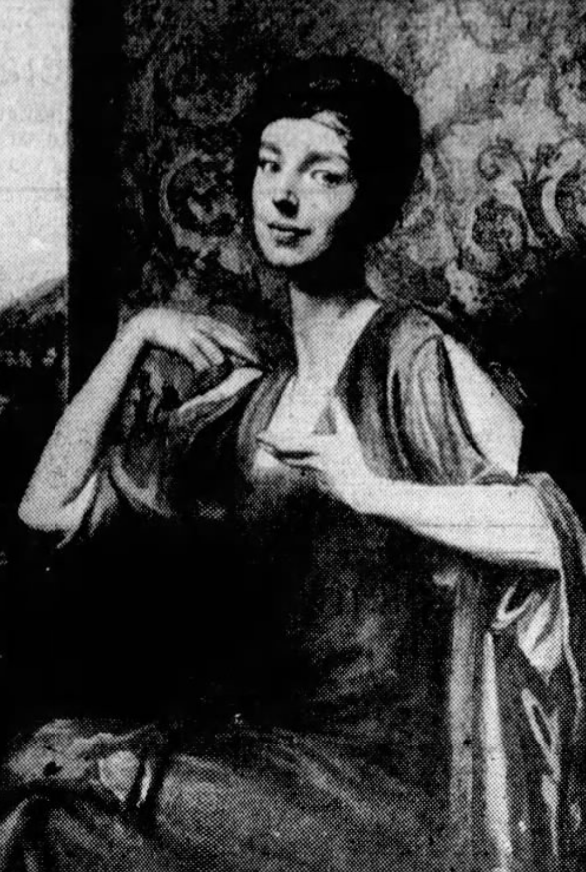
- Theda Kenyon, from a portrait by Stanislav Rembski
- Born: September 19, 1894; New York U.S.
- Died: November 16, 1997 (age 103); Montclair, New Jersey, U.S.
- Occupations: Writer, educator

Theda Kenyon (September 19, 1894 – November 16, 1997) was an American writer and educator. She wrote novels, poetry, short stories, a play, song lyrics, and a book on witchcraft, Witches Still Live: A Study of the Black Art Today (1929).

== Early life and education ==
Kenyon was from Brooklyn, New York, the daughter of theologian and Protestant Episcopal pastor Ralph Wood Kenyon and Elise Chesebrough Rathbun Kenyon. She graduated from Packer Collegiate Institute.

== Career ==
Kenyon taught poetry classes at Hunter College. She held a residency at the MacDowell Colony in 1928. She was a member of the executive board of the Poetry Society of America, and an early promoter of the poet James Still, who was once her student. She gave poetry readings, sometimes in historical costumes, and was poetry chair of the New York City Federation of Women's Clubs. Brooklyn painter Stanislav Rembski painted her portrait in the 1920s.

Most of Kenyon's novels were historical in setting, and several were based on biographies of historical figures, including Joan of Arc, Anne Hutchinson, and Richard Fanning Loper. In 1941, she performed a dramatic version of her novel-in-verse, Scarlet Anne, for a women's club in Virginia. She was guest of honor at a 1963 meeting of the Pen Women of Atlantic City.

== Publications ==
Scribner's Magazine, Volume 66, Issue 1, July 1919; Theda Kenyon's "The Vestment Maker" appeared in this issue.

=== Poetry ===
- "Tipperary Comes to Bagdad" (1917, Everybody's)
- "Beyond the Well" (1917, Munsey's)
- "The Hooverish Child" (1918, All-Story Weekly)
- "The Vestment Maker" (1919, Scribner's)
- "Out of the Desert" (1921, North American Review)
- "Pan Adolescent" (1923, North American Review)
- "Leah" (1924, North American Review)
- "The Ship Model" (1924)
- "Service", "A Valentine", and "For a Library Door" (1925, Everybody's)
- "Three Poems" (1925, Contemporary Verse)
- "Dead Letters" (1928, North American Review)
- "Widowhood" (1930, North American Review)
- "I Pray" (1931, North American Review)

=== Fiction ===
- "The Passing of Sarah" (1924, AInslee's)
- "The Gay Tyrant" (1925, McCall's)
- Certain Ladies (1930)
- "The House of the Golden Eyes" (1930, story, Weird Tales)
- Scarlet Anne (1939, a novel in verse, based on the life of Anne Hutchinson)
- Pendulum (1942, historical novel)
- The Golden Feather (1943, historical novel)
- Black Dawn (1944, a sequel to Golden Feather)
- The Skipper from Stonington (1947, novel based on the life of Richard Fanning Loper)
- Something Gleamed (1948, historical novel)
- Jeanne (1928, novel about Joan of Arc)

=== Other ===
- "My Rose" (1919, a song, music by R. Huntington Woodman)
- Gooseberries (1921, a play)
- "Witches Still Live" (1929, North American Review)
- Witches Still Live: A Study of the Black Art Today (1929)

== Personal life ==
Kenyon lived at the Marlborough-Blenheim Hotel in Atlantic City in the 1960s, and made books for hospitalized children from donated Christmas cards. She died in 1997, in Montclair, New Jersey, at the age of 103.
