= Nicolas Gouïn Dufief =

French teacher

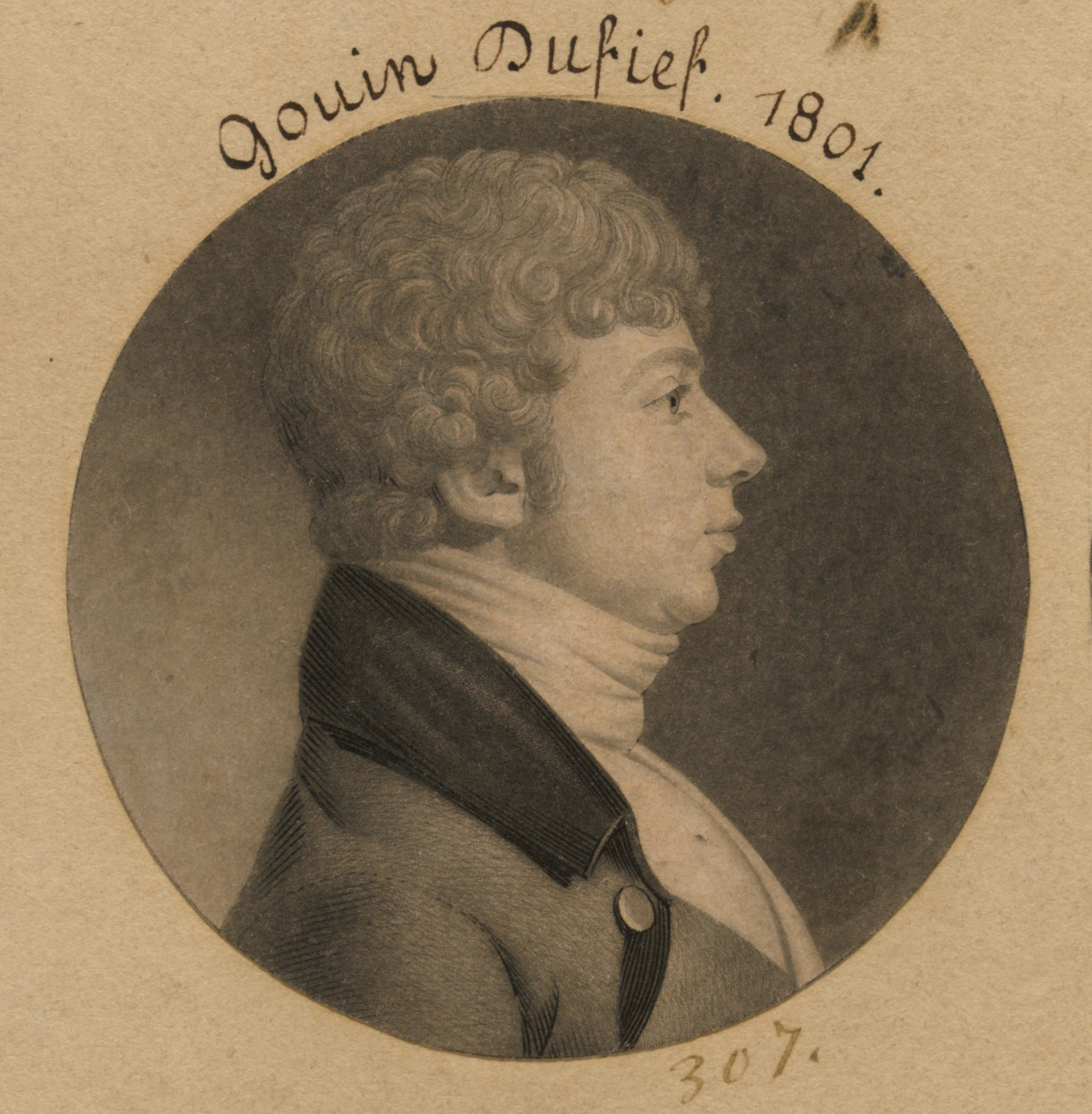
- Born: 21 September 1775; Nantes, Kingdom of France
- Died: 12 April 1834 (age 58); Pentonville, England

Nicolas Gouïn Dufief (c. 1776–1834) was a French language teacher who taught in England and America.

== Life ==
He was a native of Nantes, born in or about 1776. His father, Nicolas-Henri Dufief, a knight of the Order of Saint Louis, served during the revolution as a volunteer under the French princes in Germany; his mother, the Countess Victoire Aimée Libault Gouïn Dufief, was personally engaged in the many battles fought by her relative, General François de Charette, against the revolutionists, for which she was afterwards known as "the heroine of La Vendée".

Dufief, though a stripling of 15, joined in 1792 the royal naval corps assembled under the Charles Hector, comte d'Estaing at Enghien, and went through the campaign with his regiment in the army of the brothers of Louis XVIII until its disbandment. The same year he sought refuge in England, but soon afterwards sailed for the West Indies, and was attracted thence to Philadelphia, which he reached in July 1793. During his sojourn in America, he became acquainted with Dr. Joseph Priestley, Thomas Jefferson, and other eminent men.

Here, too, he published an essay on The Philosophy of Language, in which he first explained to the world how he was led to make those discoveries "from which my system of universal and economical instruction derives such peculiar and manifold advantages".

For nearly twenty-five years he taught French with success in America and in England, to which he returned about 1818.

He died at Pentonville, London, 12 April 1834.

== Works ==
His chief work is Nature displayed in her mode of teaching Language to Man; being a new and infallible Method of acquiring Languages with unparalleled rapidity; deduced from the analysis of the human mind, and consequently suited to every capacity: adapted to the French. To which is prefixed a development of the author's plan of tuition, 2 volumes octavo, London, 1818, which despite its size and costliness reached a twelfth edition in the author's lifetime. Shortly before his death he completed A Universal, Pronouncing, and Critical French-English Dictionary, octavo, London, 1833. He was author, too, of The French Self-interpreter, or Pronouncing Grammar, duodecimo, Exeter (1820?).
