= Raven Grimassi =

American writer (1951–2019)

- Born: Gary Charles Erbe; April 12, 1951; Pittsburgh, Pennsylvania, U.S.
- Died: March 10, 2019 (aged 67)
- Occupations: Author, Wiccan priest
- Writing career
- Genres: Occultism, Stregheria, Neopaganism, Wicca
- Notable work: Witchcraft: A Mystery Tradition

Gary Charles Erbe (April 12, 1951 – March 10, 2019), known as Raven Grimassi, was an American writer. He wrote over 20 books, including topics on Wicca, Stregheria, witchcraft and neo-paganism. He popularized Stregheria, the religious practice of witchcraft with roots in Italy. Grimassi presented this material in the form of neo-paganism through his books. He had been a practitioner of witchcraft for over 45 years and was the co-director of the Ash, Birch and Willow tradition. He died of pancreatic cancer on March 10, 2019.

== Early life and education ==
Grimassi was born Gary Charles Erbe in Pittsburgh, Pennsylvania. His father was Herbert Erbe Jr. (1922–2004), who was of German and Scots heritage, and who served as a sergeant in the United States Army in World War II. His mother was Flora Gemma Erbe (1915–2011), born in Pagani, Campania.

Herbert and Flora met in Italy during his military service, and they married in 1944. Flora's father was Giovanni Rescigno, a train station master in Naples, a Freemason, and an Italian witch. He entered the Order of the Pentagram in 1930. Grimassi wrote that his maternal grandfather was part of a tradition of Italian witches who were associated with the Carbonari revolutionary movement in the early 19th century, then joined the Masons or other secret societies as a cover for their meetings.

After some time in Pittsburgh, Herbert and Flora settled in San Diego, California, where they raised their children. Grimassi attended James Madison High School, advancing to San Diego Mesa College and San Diego City College where he studied to be a psychiatric technician.

== Wicca ==
Grimassi became involved with Wicca in 1969. He created his own system of witchcraft known as the "Aradian Tradition" ten years later, publishing it in print beginning in 1981. He was the co-directing elder of the Ash, Birch and Willow tradition. In 1994, the new age publisher Llewellyn Publications accepted his manuscript for Ways of the Strega, which was reprinted the following year as Italian Witchcraft: The Old Religion of Southern Europe.

== Stregheria ==
Reports that Grimassi claimed to belong to a "family tradition" of religious witchcraft had opened him to criticism.

Professor Sabina Magliocco, however, otherwise critical of some of Grimassi's claims, points out that "Grimassi never claims to be reproducing exactly what was practiced by Italian immigrants to North America: he admits Italian-American immigrants "have adapted a few Wiccan elements into their ways". After personally meeting Grimassi, Professor Magliocco wrote in her letter to the Pomegranate Reader's Forum:

I had the pleasure of meeting Raven Grimassi during the summer of 2001, unfortunately after the final draft of my article had already been submitted to The Pom. He was very gracious and helpful to me. From information he revealed during our interview, I can say with reasonable certainty that I believe him to have been initiated into a domestic tradition of folk magic and healing such as I describe in my article.

== Awards ==
Grimassi won "Book of the Year" and "First Place – Spirituality Book" from the Coalition of Visionary Retailers in 1998 for his book The Wiccan Mysteries, and his book the Encyclopedia of Wicca & Witchcraft was also awarded "Best Non-Fiction". His publisher, Weiser Books, produced the author's biography, Horns of Honor. Patheos listed Grimassi in 2018 as one of the 25 most influential living pagans.

== Personal life ==
In the 1970s, Grimassi recorded a garage rock song with Ritchie Brubaiter, called "Brat". After studying psychology in college, he worked for a few years for San Diego County Mental Health Services inside a secure psychiatric facility. He shifted to a center for abused children, then worked as a counselor for drug and alcohol abuse patients. The stress of these jobs moved him to study cosmetology and become a hair stylist for many years. After that he served as a financial aid counselor, then in the mid-1990s his book publishing income allowed a full-time writing career.

Grimassi's first marriage with Patty produced Michelle, born in San Diego, and his second marriage with Diane produced a daughter in 1979 – Brieanna, born in Escondido, California. Grimassi dedicated his book The Wiccan Mysteries to his "beautiful daughters, Michelle and Brieanna...". Grimassi's father died in 2004 and was buried at Fort Rosecrans National Cemetery in San Diego. His mother died in 2011 and was buried with her husband.

Grimassi's third marriage was to Stephanie Ann Zarrabi, pen-name Stephanie Taylor. From 1998, they operated a magick shop in Escondido called Raven's Loft, closing the physical store in 2002 to run it as a website. The couple moved to Springfield, Massachusetts, in 2009, but suffered a lightning strike in June 2017 which burned a portion of their house which was subsequently repaired. Stephanie announced on her Facebook page that Grimassi died on March 10, 2019, aged 67, following a battle with pancreatic cancer. He was survived by two brothers and three daughters: Kathy, Michelle and Brieanna. A memorial service was held on March 23 in Springfield.

== Bibliography ==
- 1981: The Book of the Holy Strega
- 1981: The Book of Ways Volumes I and II
- 1994: Ways of the Strega
  - reprinted as Italian Witchcraft: The Old Religion of Southern Europe in 1995
- 1999: Grimassi, Raven (1999). Hereditary Witchcraft: Secrets of the Old Religion. Llewellyn Publications. ISBN 1-56718-256-9.
- 2000: Grimassi, Raven (2000). The Encyclopedia of Wicca and Witchcraft. Llewellyn Publications. ISBN 1-56718-257-7.
- 2001: Grimassi, Raven (2001). Beltane: Springtime Rituals, Lore and Celebration. Llewellyn Publications. ISBN 1-56718-283-6.
- 2001 Grimassi, Raven (1999). Hereditary Witchcraft. Llewellyn Publications. ISBN 1-56718-256-9.
- 2002: Grimassi, Raven (1998). Wiccan Magick. Llewellyn Publications. ISBN 1-56718-255-0.
- 2002: Grimassi, Raven (2003). The Wiccan Mysteries. Llewellyn Publications. ISBN 1-56718-254-2.
- 2002: Grimassi, Raven (2002). The Witches' Craft: The Roots of Witchcraft & Magical Transformation. Llewellyn Publications. ISBN 0-7387-0265-X.
- 2003: Grimassi, Raven (2003). Spirit of the Witch: Religion & Spirituality in Contemporary Witchcraft. Llewellyn Publications. ISBN 0-7387-0338-9.
- 2003: Grimassi, Raven (2003). The Witch's Familiar: Spiritual Partnership for Successful Magic. Llewellyn Publications. ISBN 0-7387-0339-7.
- 2004: Grimassi, Raven (2004). Witchcraft: A Mystery Tradition. Llewellyn Publications. ISBN 0-7387-0596-9.
- 2005: Grimassi, Raven & Taylor Stephanie (2005). Well Worn Path: Divination Kit. Llewellyn Publications. ISBN 0-7387-0671-X.
- 2007: Grimassi, Raven & Taylor Stephanie (2007). Hidden Path: Divination Kit. Llewellyn Worldwide. ISBN 978-0-7387-1070-9.
- 2008: Grimassi, Raven (2008). Crafting Wiccan Traditions. Llewellyn Publications. ISBN 978-0-7387-1108-9.
- 2009: Grimassi, Raven (2009). The Cauldron of Memory: Retrieving Ancestral Knowledge & Wisdom. Llewellyn Publications. ISBN 978-0-7387-1575-9.
- 2011: Grimassi, Raven (October 2011). Old World Witchcraft: Ancient Ways for Modern Days. Weiser Books. ISBN 978-1-57863-505-4.
- 2014: Grimassi, Raven (August 2014). Grimoire of the Thorn-Blooded Witch. Weiser Books. ISBN 978-1-57863-550-4.
- 2016: Grimassi, Raven (January 2016). Communing with the Ancestors. Weiser Books. ISBN 978-1-57863-593-1.
- 2019: Grimassi, Raven (September 2019). What We Knew in the Night. Weiser Books. ISBN 978-1-57863-651-8.
- 2026: Grimassi, Raven (February 2026). A Grimoire of Italian Witchcraft: Practical Spells & Rituals of the Old Religion. Crossed Crow Books. ISBN 978-1-96453-758-0.

== Sources ==
- "Arician tradition". Witchvox. Archived from the original on July 7, 2022.
- Magliocco, Sabina "...this state of affairs, along with the lack of ethnographic evidence to corroborate the reports of Martello, Bruno and Grimassi, makes the existence of an Italian witch cult among Italian-Americans extremely unlikely." in "Spells, Saints, and Streghe: Witchcraft, Folk Magic, and Healing in Italy". Archived from the original on February 22, 2006.
- Magliocco, Sabina (2001). "Spells, Saints, and Streghe: Witchcraft, Folk Magic, and Healing in Italy". The Pomegranate: The Journal of Pagan Studies. 13. Archived from the original on February 22, 2006.
- Magliocco, Sabina (2001). "retraction". The Pomegranate: The Journal of Pagan Studies. 16: 48.
- Grimassi, Stephanie. "Facebook post announcing Raven Grimassi's death". Facebook. Archived from the original on February 26, 2022.
