= Charles Godfrey Leland =

American humorist and folklorist (1824–1903)

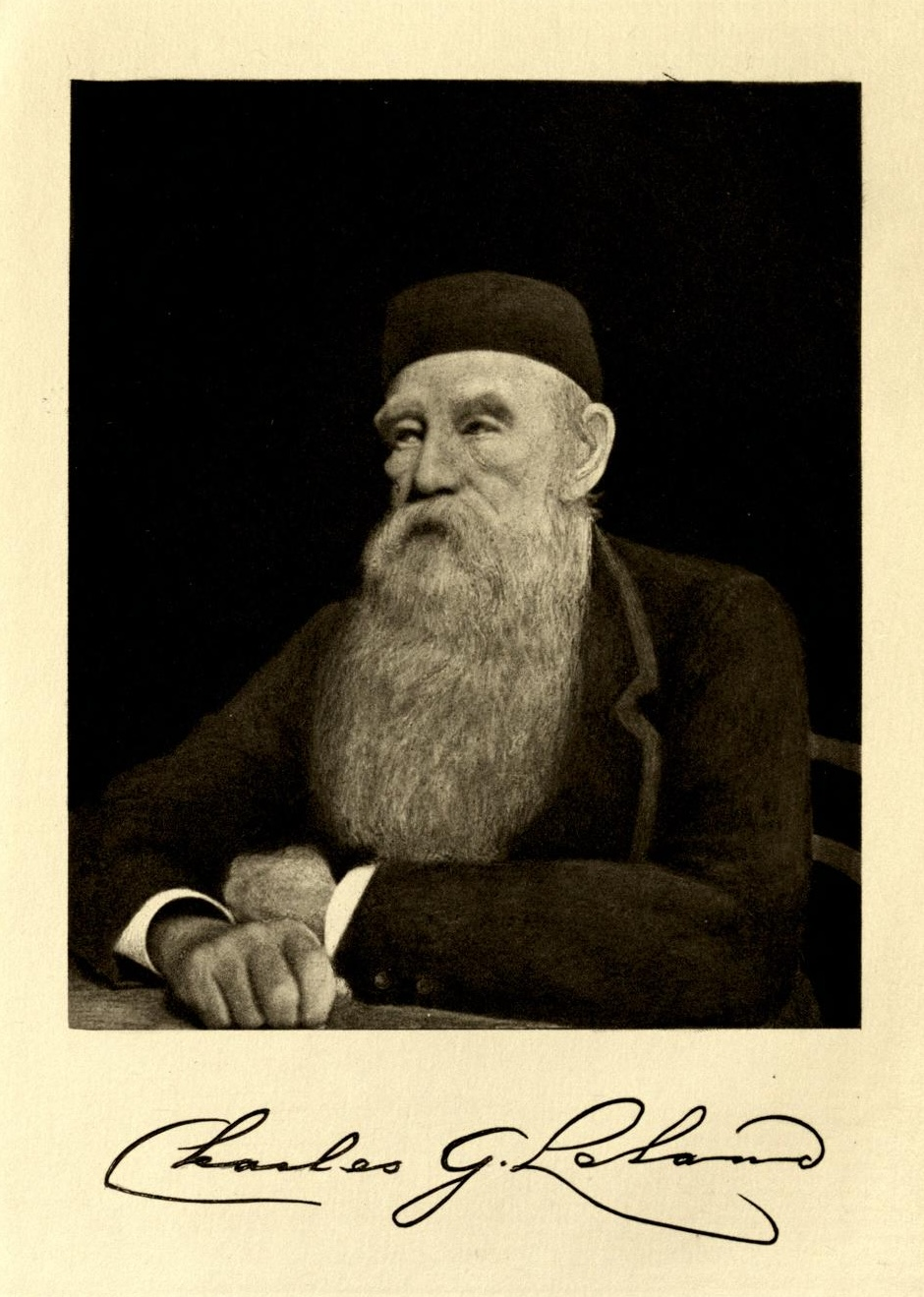
- Born: August 15, 1824; Philadelphia, Pennsylvania, U.S.
- Died: March 20, 1903 (aged 78); Florence, Italy

Signature
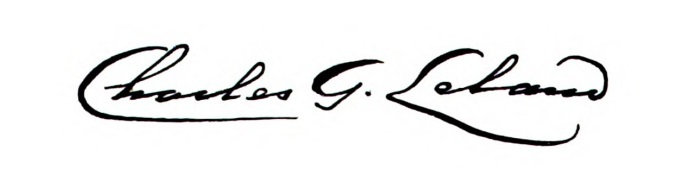

Charles Godfrey Leland (August 15, 1824 – March 20, 1903) was an American humorist and folklorist, born in Philadelphia, Pennsylvania. He was educated at Princeton University and in Europe.

Leland worked in journalism, travelled extensively, and became interested in folklore and folk linguistics. He published books and articles on American and European languages and folk traditions. He worked in a wide variety of trades, achieved recognition as the author of the comic Hans Breitmann’s Ballads, and fought in two conflicts. He published Aradia, or the Gospel of the Witches, which became a primary source text for Neopaganism half a century later.

== Early life ==
Leland was born to Charles Leland, a commission merchant, and Charlotte Godfrey on 15 August 1824 in Philadelphia, Pennsylvania. His mother was a protegee of Hannah Adams, the first American woman to write professionally. Leland believed he was descended from John Leland, among other illustrious antiquaries.

Leland claimed to have been influenced as a child by intellectual figures such as Lafayette and Nicolas Gouïn Dufief. Leland recounted that shortly after his birth, his Dutch nurse took him to the family attic and performed a ritual involving a Bible, a key, a knife, lighted candles, money, and salt to ensure him a long life as "a scholar and a wizard." His biographers refer to this account as foreshadowing his interest in folk traditions and magic. The poet George Henry Boker was his neighbour in youth, and the two maintained a friendship through adulthood. George B. McClellan was a classmate.

Leland's early education was in the United States, and he attended college at Princeton University. During his schooling, he studied languages, wrote poetry, and pursued a variety of other interests, including Hermeticism, Neoplatonism, and the writings of Rabelais and Villon.

After college, Leland went to Europe to continue his studies, first in Germany, at Heidelberg and Munich, and in 1848 at the Sorbonne in Paris, where he became involved with the Revolutions of 1848 in France, fighting at constructed barricades against the King's soldiers as a captain in the revolution.

== Career ==
=== Journalism ===
Leland returned to the U.S. after the money given to him by his father for travel had run out and passed the bar in Pennsylvania. Instead of practicing law, he instead began a career in journalism. As a journalist, Leland wrote for The Illustrated News in New York, the Evening Bulletin in Philadelphia and eventually took on editorial duties for Graham's Magazine, and the Philadelphia Press. In 1856 Leland married Eliza Bella "Isabel" Fisher.

Leland was also an editor for the Continental Monthly, a pro-Union Army publication. He enlisted in the Union Army in 1863, and fought at the Battle of Gettysburg.

=== Folklore research ===
Leland returned to Europe in 1869, and travelled widely, eventually settling in London. His fame during his lifetime rested chiefly on his comic Hans Breitmann’s Ballads (1871), written in a combination of broken English and German (not to be confused, as it often has been, with Pennsylvania German). In recent times his writings on pagan and Aryan traditions have eclipsed the now largely forgotten Breitmann ballads, influencing the development of Wicca and modern paganism.

In his travels, he made a study of the Romani, on whom he wrote more than one book. Leland began to publish a number of books on ethnography, folklore and language. His writings on Algonquian and Romani culture were part of the contemporary interest in pagan and Aryan traditions. Scholars have found Leland had taken significant liberties with his research. In his book The Algonquin Legends of New England Leland attempts to link Wabanki culture and history to the Norse. It has also come to light that Leland altered some of those folk tales in order to lend credence to his theory. He erroneously claimed to have discovered "the fifth Celtic tongue": the form of Cant, spoken among Irish Travellers, which he named Shelta. Leland became president of the English Gypsy Lore Society in 1888. In 1890, he was elected to the American Philosophical Society.

Eleven years later Godfrey produced Aradia, or the Gospel of the Witches, reportedly containing the traditional beliefs of Italian witchcraft as conveyed him in a manuscript provided by a woman named Maddalena, whom he refers to as his "witch informant." This remains his most influential book. Aradia's accuracy has been disputed, and used by others as a study of witch lore in 19th century Italy. Ronald Hutton summarises academic positions on the text, and notes the "current scholarly consensus that Aradia does not describe a genuine Italian witch religion", but that researchers have "fail[ed] to clinch the matter of how it was written".

=== Art education ===
Leland was also a pioneer of art and design education, becoming an important influence on the Arts and Crafts movement. In his memoirs he wrote, "The story of what is to me by far the most interesting period of my life remains to be written. This embraces an account of my labour for many years in introducing Industrial Art as a branch of education in schools."

He was involved in a series of books on industrial arts and crafts, including Pyrography or burnt-wood etching (1876), co-authored with Thomas Bolas (revised by Frank H Ball and G J Fowler in 1900). He was, more significantly, the founder and first director of the Public School of Industrial Art in Philadelphia (not to be confused with the contemporaneous Pennsylvania Museum and School of Industrial Art). This originated as a school to teach crafts to disadvantaged children and became widely known when it was praised by Oscar Wilde, who predicted his friend would be "recognised and honoured as one of the great pioneers and leaders of the art of the future." The Home Arts and Industries Association was founded in imitation of this initiative.

== Translations ==
Leland translated the collective works of the German Romanticist Heinrich Heine, and poems by Joseph Victor von Scheffel into English. He translated Eichendorff's novella Aus dem Leben eines Taugenichts to English as Memoirs of a Good-for-Nothing, published in New York in 1866 by Leypohlt & Holt.

== Legacy ==
His biography was written by his niece Elizabeth Robins Pennell, an American who also settled in London and made her living in part by writing about travels in Europe. Leland had encouraged her as a young woman to consider writing as a career, which she did with some success.

A work of light verse by Leland, written in a parody of a German-inflected English, includes the lines: "I valtzet mit Matilda Yane... / She vayed 'pout dwo hoondred pound." This may have provided the inspiration for the Australian expression Waltzing Matilda, meaning to walk while carrying the burden of one's swag, or bedroll.

== Select bibliography ==
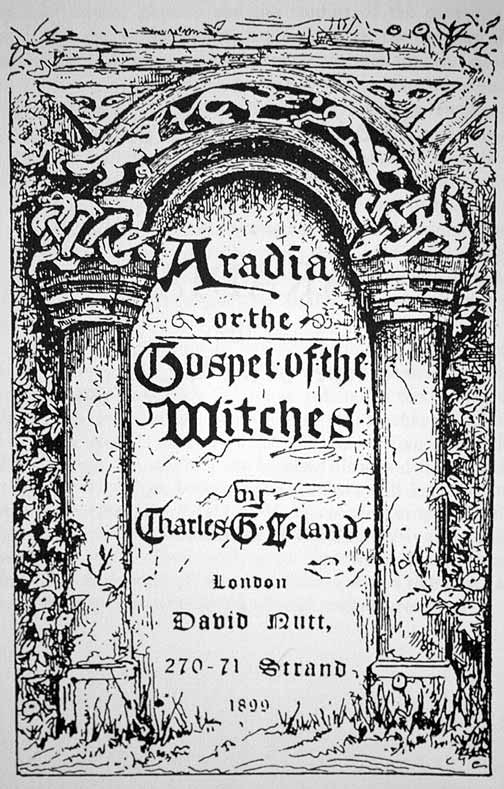
Title page of the original edition of Aradia.

- 1855: Meister Karl’s Sketch-book
- 1864: Legends of Birds
- 1866: The Art of Conversation, With Directions for Self Education
- 1871: Hans Breitmann’s Ballads
- 1872: Pidgin-English Sing-Song
- 1872: The Music-Lesson of Confucius, and Other Poems
- 1873: The English Gipsies
- 1875: Fusang or the Discovery of America by Chinese Buddhist Priests in the Fifth Century
- 1876: Johnnykin and the Goblins
- 1882: The Gypsies
- 1884: Algonquin Legends
- 1889: A dictionary of slang, jargon & cant embracing English, American, and Anglo-Indian slang, pidgin English, gypsies' jargon and other irregular phraseology (2 Vols.)
- 1891: Gypsy Sorcery and Fortune Telling
- 1892: The Hundred Riddles of the Fairy Bellaria
- 1892: Etruscan Roman Remains in Popular Tradition
- 1892: Leather Work, A Practical Manual for Learners
- 1895: Songs of the Sea and Lays of the Land
- 1896: Legends of Florence Collected from the People (2 vols.)
- 1896: A Manual of Mending and Repairing with Diagrams
- 1899: Unpublished Legends of Virgil
- 1899: Aradia, or the Gospel of the Witches
- 1899: Have You a Strong Will?
- 1901: Legends of Virgil
- 1901: Life and Adventures of James P. Beckwourth, Mountainner, Scout, Pioneer, and Chief of the Crow Nation of Indians Edited by.
- 1902: Flaxius, or Leaves from the Life of an Immortal
- 1904: The Alternate Sex: or, The female Intellect in Man, and the Masculine in Woman. "Mrs. Joseph Pennell [Elizabeth Robins Pennell] ... has kindly seen the book through the press." (New York: Funk & Wagnalls Company, 1904)
