= Witch trials in the early modern period =

Prosecutions for witchcraft in Europe

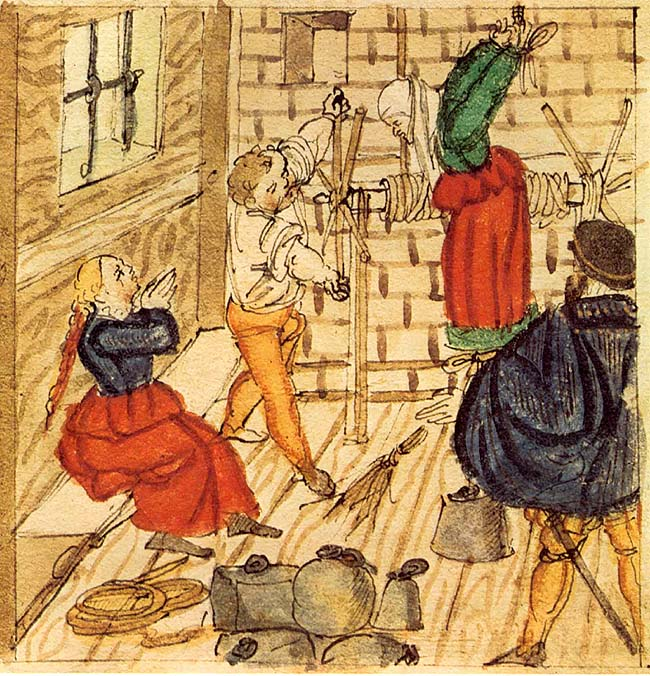
The torture used against accused witches, 1577

In the early modern period, from about 1400 to 1775, about 100,000 people were prosecuted for witchcraft in Europe and British America. Between 40,000 and 60,000 were executed, almost all in Europe. (Note: Hutton 2010, p. 247. Scarre and Callow (2001) put forward 40,000 as an estimate for the number killed.(Scarre & Callow 2001, pp. 1, 21) Levack (2006) came to an estimate of 45,000. Levack, Brian (2006). The Witch Hunt in Early Modern Europe Third Edition. Longman. Page 23. Hutton (2010) estimated that the numbers were between 40,000–50,000,(Hutton 2010, p. 247) Wolfgang Behringer and Lyndal Roper had independently calculated the number as being between 50,000–60,000.(Behringer 2004, p. 149; Roper 2004, pp. 6–7) In an earlier unpublished essay, Hutton counted local estimates, and in areas where estimates were unavailable attempted to extrapolate from nearby regions with similar demographics and attitudes towards witch hunting. "Estimates of Executions (based on Hutton's essay 'Counting the Witch Hunt')"..) The witch hunts were particularly severe in parts of the Holy Roman Empire. Prosecutions for witchcraft reached a high point from 1560 to 1630, during the Counter-Reformation and the European wars of religion. Among the lower classes, accusations of witchcraft were usually made by neighbors, and women and men made formal accusations of witchcraft. In some regions, convicted witches were burnt at the stake, the traditional punishment for religious heresy.

Magical healers or 'cunning folk' were sometimes prosecuted for witchcraft, but seem to have made up a minority of the accused. Roughly 80% of those convicted were women, most of them over the age of 40.

== Medieval background ==
=== Christian doctrine ===
Throughout the medieval era, mainstream Christian doctrine had denied the belief in the existence of witches and witchcraft, condemning it as a pagan superstition. Some have argued that the work of the Dominican Thomas Aquinas in the 13th century helped lay the groundwork for a shift in Christian doctrine, by which certain Christian theologians eventually began to accept the possibility of collaboration with devil(s), resulting in a person obtaining certain real supernatural powers. Christians as a whole were not of the belief that magic in its entirety is demonic, for members of the clergy practiced crafts such as necromancy, the practice of communicating with the dead. However, witchcraft was still assumed as inherently demonic, so backlash to witches was inevitable due to the collective negative image.

=== A branch of the inquisition in southern France ===
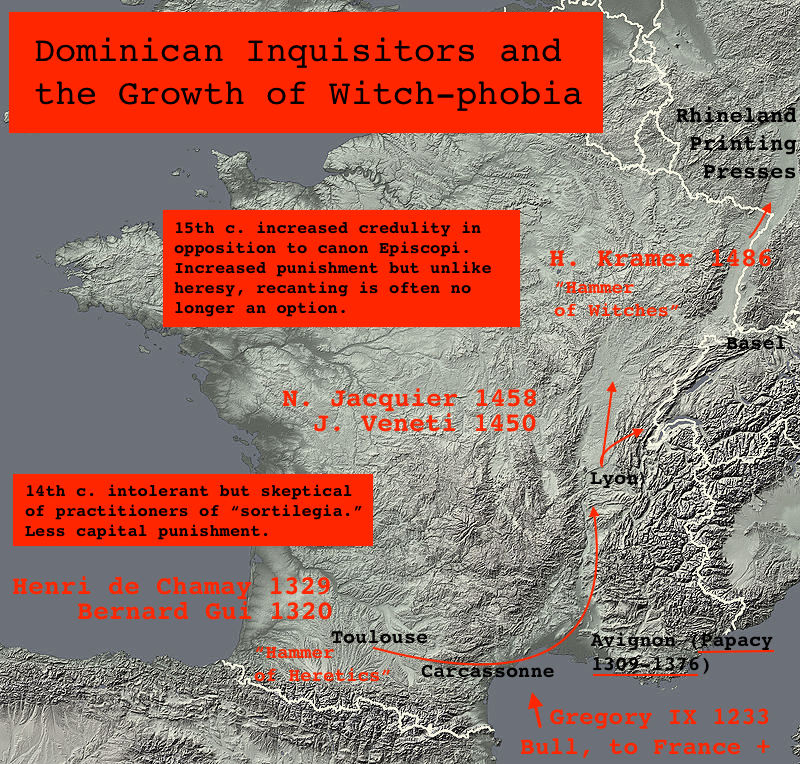
Dominican Inquisitors and the Growth of Witch-phobia

In 1233, a papal bull by Gregory IX established a new branch of the inquisition in Toulouse, France, to be led by the Dominicans. It was intended to prosecute Christian groups considered heretical, such as the Cathars and the Waldensians.

Records were usually kept by the French inquisitors, but the majority of these records did not survive, and one historian who was working in 1880, Charles Molinier, refers to the surviving records as only scanty debris. Molinier notes that the inquisitors themselves describe their attempts to carefully safeguard their records, especially when they were moving from town to town. The inquisitors were widely hated and they would be ambushed on the road, but their records were more often the target than the inquisitors themselves [plus désireux encore de ravir les papiers que porte le juge que de le faire périr lui-même] (better to take the papers the judge carries than to make the judge himself perish). The records seem to have often been targeted by the accused or their friends and family, wishing to thereby sabotage the proceedings or failing that, to spare their reputations and the reputations of their descendants. This would be all the more true for those who were accused of practicing witchcraft. Difficulty in understanding the larger witchcraft trials which were to come in later centuries is deciding how much can be extrapolated from what remains.

Witch persecutions in modern period

=== 14th century ===
There was no concept of demonic witchcraft during the fourteenth century; only at a later time did a unified concept combine the ideas of noxious magic, a pact with the Devil and an assembly of witches for Satanic worship into one category of crime. Witch trials were infrequent compared to later centuries and a significant proportion of them were held in France. Until 1330 the trials were linked to prominent figures in the church or politics, as victims or as accused suspects, and more than half took place in France, where it was the usual way of explaining royal deaths in the direct Capetian line. The papacy of John XXII was another engine for witchcraft accusations. There were also a significant number of trials in England and Germany. The charges were generally mild. Diabolism, believed to involve nocturnal orgies and traditionally linked to accusations of heresy, was a very rare charge in the witch trials. After 1334 the political dimension of witchcraft accusations disappeared, while the charges remained mild. The large majority of trials until 1375 were in France and Germany. The number of witch trials rose after 1375, when many municipal court-adopted inquisitorial procedures and penalties for false accusations were abolished. Prominent centres of witch prosecutions were France, Germany, Switzerland and Italy. In Italy a new development occurred when accusations of diabolism gradually became more common and more important in prosecutions, although they were still less common than trials for sorcery. Records of witch trials from this century also lacked extensive descriptions of meetings of witches.

In 1329, with the papacy in nearby Avignon, the inquisitor of Carcassonne sentenced a Carmelite friar called Peter Recordi to the dungeon for life. The sentence refers to ... multas et diversas daemonum conjurationes et invocationes ... and it frequently uses the same Latin synonym as a word for witchcraft, sortilegia—found on the title page of Nicolas Rémy's work from 1595, where it is claimed that 900 persons were executed for sortilegii crimen. He was accused of using love magic to seduce women and of invoking Satan and sacrificing a butterfly to him.

==== Lamothe-Langon ====
Earlier works on witchcraft often placed a large number of stereotypical witch trials in southern France in the early fourteenth century. This is the result of Étienne-Léon de Lamothe-Langon, who published Histoire de l'inquisition en France in 1829. He described a sudden outburst of mass witch trials ending in hundreds of executions, and the accused were portrayed as the stereotypical demonic witch. He purported to extensively quote in translation from inquisitorial records. His book proved influential. Joseph Hansen included large excerpts from the book, though Lamothe-Langon's sources could not be found at the end of the nineteenth century. Through reuse by other writers, Lamothe-Langon's work established the view that witch hunts suddenly began in the late Middle Ages and implied a link with Catharism. Academics continued to rely on Lamothe-Langon as a source until Norman Cohn and Richard Kieckhefer showed independently in the 1970s that the alleged records in Histoire de l'inquisition were highly dubious and possible forgeries. Kieckhefer notes that an 1855 publication of a summary inventory from inquisitorial records from Carcassonne did not match with Lamothe-Langon's work at all. Besides, the language and stereotypes in the supposed records were anachronistic. Lamothe-Langon also had a track record of forging several genealogies about his ancestry, and his political motive was shown by his polemics against censorship. By the time that historians rejected his work, it was already firmly entrenched in the popular image of witchcraft.

=== 15th century trials and the growth of the new view on witchcraft ===
Witch trials were still uncommon in the 15th century when the concept of diabolical witchcraft began to emerge. The study of four chronicles concerning events in Valais, the Bernese Alps and the nearby region of Dauphiné has supported the scholarly proposal that some ideas concerning witchcraft were taking hold in the region around western Switzerland during the 1430s, recasting the practice of witchcraft as an alliance between a person and the devil that would undermine and threaten the Christian foundation of society. The Perrissona Gappit case tried in Switzerland in 1465 is noted for the thoroughness of the surviving record.

The skeptical Canon Episcopi retained many supporters, and still seems to have been supported by the theological faculty at the University of Paris in their decree from 1398. It was never officially repudiated by a majority of bishops within the papal lands, nor even by the Council of Trent, which immediately preceded the peak of the trials. But in 1428, the Valais witch trials, lasting six to eight years, started in the French-speaking lower Valais and eventually spread to German-speaking regions. This time period also coincided with the Council of Basel (1431–1437) and some scholars have suggested a new anti-witchcraft doctrinal view may have spread among certain theologians and inquisitors in attendance at this council as the Valais trials were discussed. Not long after, a cluster of powerful opponents of the Canon Episcopi emerged: a Dominican inquisitor in Carcassonne named Jean Vinet, the Bishop of Avila Alfonso Tostado, and another Dominican Inquisitor named Nicholas Jacquier. It is unclear whether the three men were aware of each other's work. The coevolution of their shared view centres around "a common challenge: disbelief in the reality of demonic activity in the world."

Nicholas Jacquier's lengthy and complex argument against the Canon Episcopi was written in Latin. It began as a tract in 1452 and was expanded into a fuller monograph in 1458. Many copies seem to have been made by hand (nine manuscript copies still exist), but it was not printed until 1561. Jacquier describes a number of trials he personally witnessed, including one of a man named Guillaume Edelin, against whom the main charge seems to have been that he had preached a sermon in support of the Canon Episcopi claiming that witchcraft was merely an illusion. In 1459, Jacquier assisted the inquisitor of Arras Pierre le Broussard in launching the series of witch trials known as the Vauderie d’Arras.

In the Catalan Pyrenees during the Kingdom of Aragon, in 1424 the Code of Ordinances of the Àneu Valleys were enacted and is the first legal text in Europe that specifically addresses the persecution of witchcraft and provides insight into medieval legislation related to the phenomenon of witchcraft.

==== 1486: Malleus Maleficarum ====
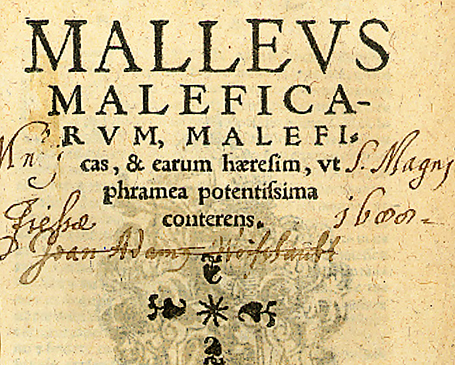
Title page of the seventh Cologne edition of the Malleus Maleficarum, 1520 (from the University of Sydney Library). The Latin title is "MALLEUS MALEFICARUM, Maleficas, & earum hæresim, ut phramea potentissima conterens." (Generally translated into English as The Hammer of Witches which destroyeth Witches and their heresy as with a two-edged sword).

The most important and influential book which promoted the new view on witchcraft was the Malleus Maleficarum, published in 1487 by clergyman and German inquisitor Heinrich Kramer, accompanied by Jacobus Sprenger. Malleus Maleficarum is split up into three different sections, each individual section addressing an aspect of witches and their culture. The following sections were magic, a witches origin, and appropriate punishment. The appropriate punishment section divides offenses into three different levels, ranging from slight, great, and very great. Slight could be something as simple as a small group meeting to practice witchcraft, while on the other hand, very great included respecting and admiring heretics. Kramer begins his work in opposition to the Canon Episcopi, but oddly, he does not cite Jacquier, and he may not have been aware of his work. Kramer had met strong resistance by those who opposed his view; this inspired him to write his work as both propaganda and a manual for like-minded zealots. The Gutenberg printing press had only recently been invented along the Rhine River, and Kramer fully utilized it to shepherd his work into print and spread the ideas that had been developed by inquisitors and theologians in France into the Rhineland. The theological views espoused by Kramer were influential but remained contested. Nonetheless Malleus Maleficarum was printed 13 times between 1486 and 1520, and – following a 50-year pause that coincided with the height of the Protestant reformations – it was printed again another 16 times (1574–1669) in the decades following the important Council of Trent which had remained silent with regard to Kramer's theological views. It inspired many similar works, such as an influential work by Jean Bodin, and was cited as late as 1692 by Increase Mather, then president of Harvard College.

The increased demonization of witches blossomed in relation with the expansion and increased popularity of the Malleus Maleficarum. Given the book was published nearly thirty times between the years 1487 and 1669 across Europe, it easily provided Europe's literate citizens with a more concrete, solidified depiction of a witch. Kramer creates an idea of a new medieval witch, that being an evil woman, which far outstretches to the modern day. Through the spread of Kramer's depiction of a witch through this book, the public outlook of witchcraft soon transformed from evil to demonic.

A difference between earlier accusations and modern day accusations is that in the 1500s, accusations were rooted in fears of malicious supernatural harm – often attributed to familiar spirits. This led to formal witch trials and executions. Such accusations targeted individuals suspected of curses, causing ailments or crop failures, reflecting deep-seated anxieties about hidden malevolent forces within rural communities. Malleus Maleficarum (1487) was accused. In the modern period, it was more aligned with evolving perspectives on magic and the supernatural, influenced by scientific progress and Enlightenment thinking.

== Peak of the trials: 1560–1630 ==
The period of the European witch trials with the most active phase and the largest number of fatalities seems to have occurred between 1560 and 1630. This period saw more than 40,000 deaths.

Authors have debated whether witch trials were more intense in Catholic or Protestant regions; however, the intensity had not so much to do with Catholicism or Protestantism, as both regions experienced a varied intensity of witchcraft persecutions. In Catholic Spain and Portugal, for example, the numbers of witch trials were few because the Spanish and Portuguese Inquisitions preferred to focus on the crime of public heresy rather than the crime of witchcraft, whereas Protestant Scotland had a much larger number of witchcraft trials. It has also been argued that Protestant rejection of the intermediate state of the afterlife led negative supernatural experiences of ghosts to instead be attributed to witches and demons. In contrast, the witch trials in the Protestant Netherlands stopped earlier, and they were among the least numerous in Europe, while the large-scale mass witch trials which took place in the autonomous territories of the Catholic prince-bishops in Southern Germany were infamous in all of the Western world, and the contemporary writer Herman Löher described how they affected the population within them:

The Roman Catholic subjects, farmers, winegrowers, and artisans in the episcopal lands are the most terrified people on earth, since the false witch trials affect the German episcopal lands incomparably more than France, Spain, Italy or Protestants.

The mass witch trials took place in Southern Catholic Germany in waves between the 1560s and the 1620s. Some trials went on to continue for years and would result in hundreds of executions of both sexes, all ages, and classes. These included the Trier witch trials (1581–1593), the Fulda witch trials (1603–1606), the Eichstätt witch trials (1613–1630), the Würzburg witch trials (1626–1631), and the Bamberg witch trials (1626–1631). The Würzburg witch trials were among the largest and deadliest in history, and they highlighted the growing paranoia and the power of witchcraft accusations to manipulate political and religious conflicts. They were conducted from 1626 to 1631 under Prince-Bishop Philipp Adolf von Ehrenberg and led to the execution of approximately 900 individuals. Victims spanned all social classes, including nobles, councilmen, and even children as young as seven. The trials were characterized by the use of torture to extract confessions and the naming of alleged accomplices, which caused a cycle of accusations and executions. Another famous trial that happened during this time was that of Ursula Kemp. Kemp's case showed what happens when a woman does not conform to societal expectations due to the accusations made by Thurlow and Letherdale.

In 1590, the North Berwick witch trials occurred in Scotland and were of particular note as the king, James VI, became involved himself. James had developed a fear that witches planned to kill him after he suffered from storms while traveling to Denmark in order to claim his bride, Anne, earlier that year. Returning to Scotland, the king heard of trials that were occurring in North Berwick, and ordered the suspects to be brought to him—he subsequently believed that a nobleman, Francis Stewart, 5th Earl of Bothwell, was a witch, and after the latter fled in fear of his life, he was outlawed as a traitor. The king subsequently set up royal commissions to hunt down witches in his realm, recommending torture in dealing with suspects, and in 1597 wrote a book about the menace witches posed to society entitled Daemonologie.

The Pendle witch trials of 1612 are some of the most prominent in English history, resulting in the hanging of ten of the eleven who were tried.

The witch-panic phenomenon reached the more remote parts of Europe, as well as North America, later in the 17th century, among them being the Salzburg witch trials, the Swedish Torsåker witch trials and, in 1692, the Salem witch trials in Colonial New England.

== Decline of the trials: 1630–1750 ==
There had never been a lack of skepticism regarding the trials. In Catalonia, in January 1619, the Jesuit Pere Gil delivered a document to the Spanish viceroy to Catalonia Francisco Fernández de la Cueva, 7th Duke of Alburquerque against the witch hunt. Following the arrest of Caterina Freixa on 8 November 1619, between 1619 and 1622, a widespread debate opened between supporters of hunting and its opponents after fourteen prestigious Catalan jurists linked to Generalitat de Catalunya (among them Joan Pere Fontanella) signed a document in defence of Caterina Freixa's innocence to try to avoid her death sentence, marking the beginning of the end of witch hunt in Catalonia.

In 1635, the authorities of the Roman Inquisition acknowledged its own trials had "found scarcely one trial conducted legally". In the middle of the 17th century, the difficulty in proving witchcraft according to the legal process contributed to Rothenburg (Germany) following advice to treat witchcraft cases with caution.

Although the witch trials had begun to fade out across much of Europe by the mid-17th century, they continued on the fringes of Europe and in the American Colonies. In the Nordic countries, the late 17th century saw the peak of the trials in a number of areas: the Torsåker witch trials of Sweden (1674), where 71 people were executed for witchcraft in a single day, the peak of witch hunting in Swedish Finland, and the Salzburg witch trials in Austria (where 139 people were executed from 1675 to 1690).

The 1692 Salem witch trials were one of the last outbursts of witch panic that occurred in the New World when the practice was waning in Europe. In the 1690s, Winifred King Benham and her daughter Winifred were thrice tried during the witch trials in Connecticut, the last of such trials in New England. Even though they were found innocent, they were compelled to leave Wallingford and settle in Staten Island, New York. In 1706, Grace Sherwood of Virginia was tried by ducking and jailed for allegedly being a witch. Europe had a wide range of execution and torture methods; the method used depended on the time period and the legal processes. Some of the execution methods included: beheading, burning at the strake, drowning, and hanging. The only methods used in Salem were hanging (for execution) and pressing (torture that could lead to death).

Rationalist historians in the 18th century came to the opinion that the use of torture had resulted in erroneous testimony.

In 1712, Rabbi Hirsch Fränkel was convicted of witchcraft after completion of an inquisition by the Theological & Legal Faculties at the University of Aldorf. Rabbi Fränkel was a self-avowed Kabbalist, a follower of a Jewish tradition of mystical interpretation of the Bible. The Fränkel witchtrial was one of the first convictions obtained without the use of spectral evidence or confession obtained through torture. Fränkel was sentenced to life imprisonment and spent twenty-four years in solitary confinement in the tower of Schwabach.

In France, scholars have found that with increased fiscal capacity and a stronger central government, the witchcraft accusations began to decline. The witch trials that occurred there were symptomatic of a weak legal system and "witches were most likely to be tried and convicted in regions where magistrates departed from established legal statutes".

During the early 18th century, the practice subsided. The last people to be executed in England as witches are thought to be those convicted in the Bideford witch trial. Jane Wenham was among the last subjects of a typical witch trial in England in 1712, but was pardoned after her conviction and set free. Janet Horne was executed for witchcraft in Scotland in 1727. The Witchcraft Act 1735 (9 Geo. 2. c. 5) put an end to the traditional form of witchcraft as a legal offense in Britain. Those accused under the new act were restricted to those that pretended to be able to conjure spirits (generally being the most dubious professional fortune tellers and mediums), and punishment was light.

In Austria, Maria Theresa outlawed witch-burning and torture in 1768. The last capital trial, that of Maria Pauer occurred in 1750 in Salzburg, which was then outside the Austrian domain.

=== Sporadic witch-hunts after 1750 ===
In the late 18th century the practice of witchcraft had ceased to be considered a criminal offense throughout Europe, but there are a number of trials which, while technically not witch trials, are suspected to have involved a belief in witches. In 1782, Anna Göldi was executed in Glarus, Switzerland. Officially she was executed for "poisoning" (her employer, who believed that she had practiced witchcraft on his daughter)—a ruling at the time widely denounced throughout Switzerland and Germany as judicial murder. Like Anna Göldi, Barbara Zdunk was executed in 1811 in Prussia, not technically for witchcraft, but for arson. In Poland, the Doruchów witch trials occurred in 1783, and two additional women were executed for sorcery. They were tried by a legal court, but with dubious legitimacy.

Despite the official ending of the trials for witchcraft, there would still be occasional and unofficial witch-hunts and killings of those who were accused of practicing witchcraft in parts of Europe, such as the killings of Anna Klemens in Denmark (1800), Krystyna Ceynowa in Poland (1836), and Dummy, the Witch of Sible Hedingham in England (1863). In France, there was sporadic violence and there was even murder in the 1830s, with one woman reportedly burnt in a village square in Nord.

In the 1830s, a prosecution for witchcraft was commenced against a man in Fentress County, Tennessee, either named Joseph or William Stout, based upon his alleged influence over the health of a young woman. The case against the supposed witch was dismissed upon the failure of the alleged victim, who had sworn out a warrant against him, to appear for the trial. However, some of his other accusers were convicted on criminal charges for their part in the matter, and various libel actions were brought.

The killing of people who were suspected of performing malevolent sorcery against their neighbors continued into the 20th and 21st centuries. In 1997, two Russian farmers killed a woman and injured five members of her family because they believed that the woman and her relatives had used folk magic against them. It has been reported that between 2005 and 2011, more than 3,000 people were killed for allegedly being witches by lynch mobs in Tanzania. Witchcraft was officially a crime in Papua New Guinea from 1971 until 2013.

== Procedures and punishments ==
=== Evidence ===
Peculiar standards applied to witchcraft allowing certain types of evidence "that are now ways relating Fact, and done many Years before". There was no possibility to offer alibi as a defense because witchcraft did not require the presence of the accused at the scene. Witnesses were called to testify to motives and effects because it was believed that witnessing the invisible force of witchcraft was impossible: "half proofes are to be allowed, and are good causes of suspicion". The sole identifier of a witch was the Devil's mark. A scar, given to a witch by the devil, could be anywhere on the body. However, in order to find this scar, the body had to be thoroughly examined. This lack of a recognizable feature led to flexibility. This flexibility enabled the phenomenon of witches to expand, solidifying the fear that witches are a danger that could be within anyone, anywhere.

=== Punishments ===
A variety of different punishments were employed for those found guilty of witchcraft, including imprisonment, flogging, fines, or exile. Non-capital punishment, especially for a first offence, was most common in England. Prior to 1542, Church courts dealt with most cases in England and most sanctions were directed more to penance and atonement than harsh punishments. Often the guilty party was ordered to attend the parish church, wearing a white sheet and carrying a wand, and swear to lead a reformed life. The Old Testament's book of Exodus (22:18) states, "Thou shalt not permit a sorceress to live". Many faced capital punishment for witchcraft, either by burning at the stake, hanging, or beheading. Similarly, in New England, people convicted of witchcraft were hanged. Meanwhile, in the Middle Ages, heresy became a heinous crime, warranting severe punishment, so when one was accused of being a witch they were thus labeled as a heretic. If accused of witchcraft, the accused was forced to confess, even if they were innocent, through brutal torture, just to in the end be killed for their crimes. In certain instances, the clergy became truly concerned about the souls they were executing. Therefore, they decided to burn the accused witches alive in order to "save them".

=== Interrogations and torture ===
Various acts of torture were used against accused witches to coerce confessions and cause them to provide names of alleged co-conspirators. Most historians agree that the majority of those persecuted in these witch trials were innocent of any involvement in Devil worship. The torture of witches began to increase in frequency after 1468, when the Pope declared witchcraft to be crimen exceptum and thereby removed all legal limits on the application of torture in cases where evidence was difficult to find.

In Italy, an accused witch was deprived of sleep for periods up to forty hours. This technique was also used in England, but without a limitation on time. Sexual humiliation was used, such as forced sitting on red-hot stools with the claim that the accused woman would not perform sexual acts with the devil. In most cases, those who endured the torture without confessing were released.

The use of torture has been identified as a key factor in converting the trial of one accused witch into a wider social panic, as those being tortured were more likely to accuse a wide array of other local individuals of also being witches.

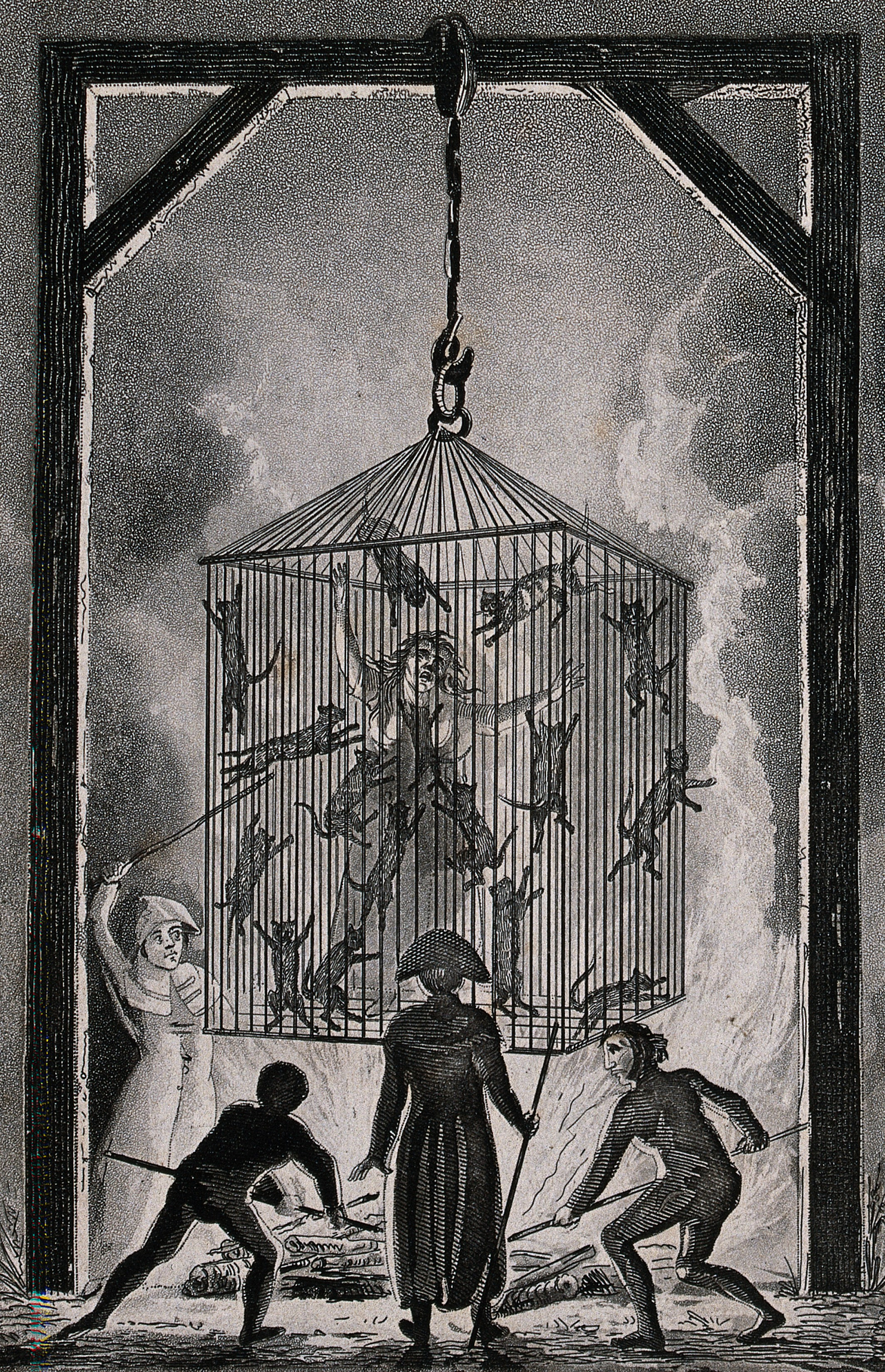
The burning of a French midwife in a cage filled with black cats

== Estimates of the total number of executions ==
The scholarly consensus on the total number of executions for witchcraft ranges from 40,000 to 60,000 (not including unofficial lynchings of accused witches, which went unrecorded but are nevertheless believed to have been somewhat rare in the Early Modern period). It would also have been the case that various individuals would have died as a result of the unsanitary conditions of their imprisonment, but again this is not recorded within the number of executions.

Attempts at estimating the total number of executions for witchcraft have a history going back to the end of the period of witch-hunts in the 18th century. A scholarly consensus only emerges in the second half of the 20th century, and historical estimates vary wildly depending on the method used. Early estimates tend to be highly exaggerated, as they were still part of rhetorical arguments against the persecution of witches rather than purely historical scholarship.

Notably, a figure of nine million victims was given by Gottfried Christian Voigt in 1784 in an argument criticizing Voltaire's estimate of "several hundred thousand" as too low. Voigt's number has shown remarkably resilient as an influential popular myth, surviving well into the 20th century, especially in feminist and neo-pagan literature. In the 19th century, some scholars were agnostic, for instance, Jacob Grimm (1844) talked of "countless" victims and Charles Mackay (1841) named "thousands upon thousands". By contrast, a popular news report of 1832 cited a number of 3,192 victims "in Great Britain alone". In the early 20th century, some scholarly estimates on the number of executions still ranged in the hundreds of thousands. The estimate was only reliably placed below 100,000 in scholarship of the 1970s.

== Causes and Interpretations ==
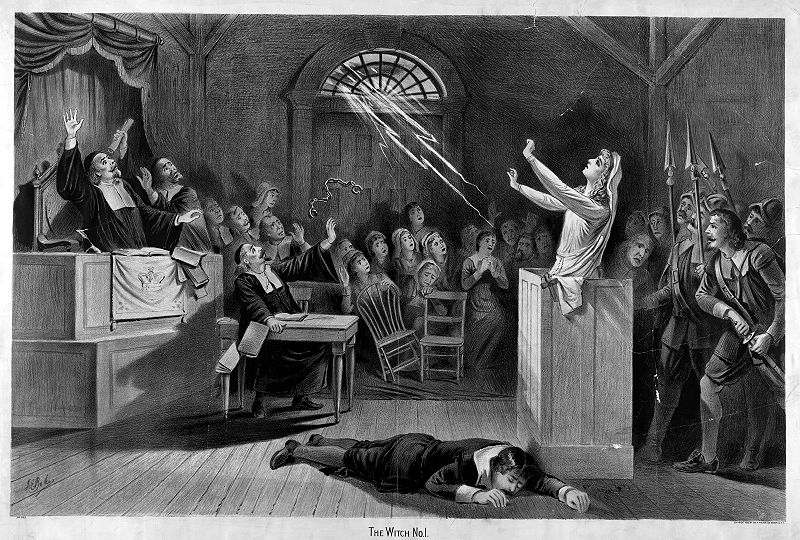
The Witch, No. 1, c. 1892 lithograph by Joseph E. Baker

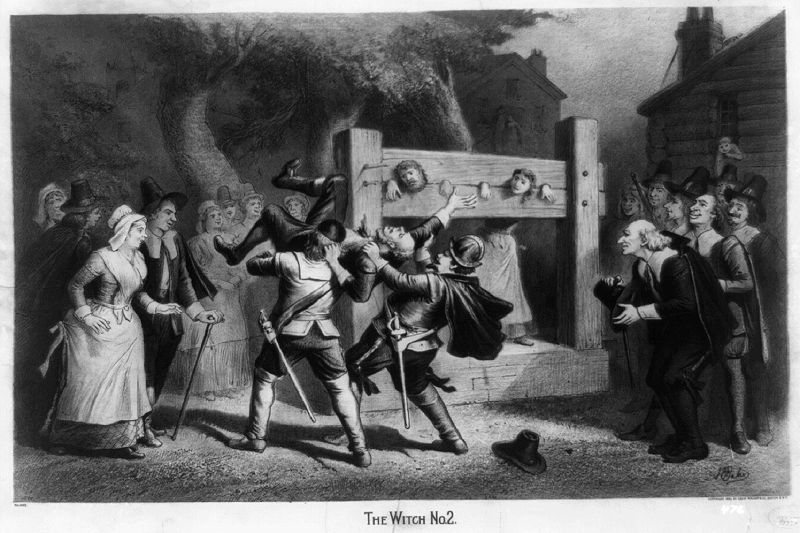
The Witch, No. 2, c. 1892 lithograph by Joseph E. Baker

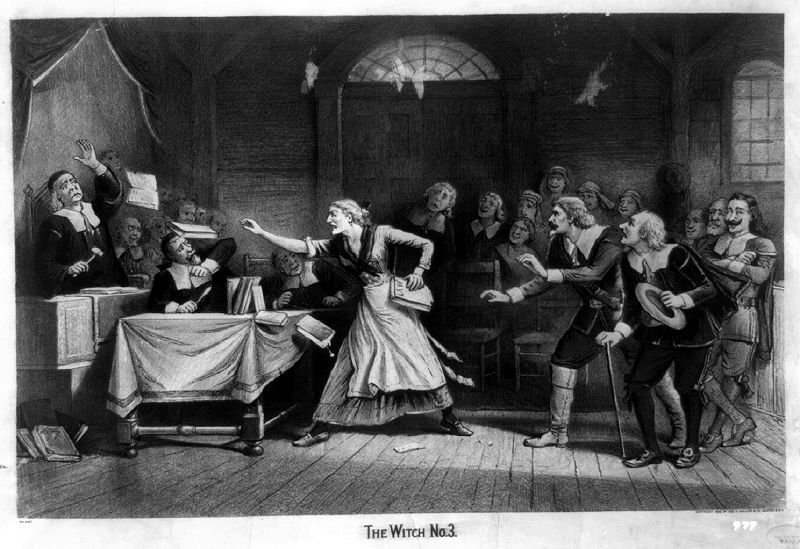
The Witch, No. 3, c. 1892 lithograph by Joseph E. Baker

=== Regional differences ===
There were many regional differences in the manner in which the witch trials occurred. The trials themselves emerged sporadically, flaring up in some areas but neighbouring areas remaining largely unaffected. In general, there seems to have been less witch-phobia in Spain and the papal lands of Italy in comparison to France and the Holy Roman Empire.

There was much regional variation within the British Isles. In Ireland, for example, there were few trials.

There are particularly important differences between the English and continental witch-hunting traditions. In England the use of torture was rare and the methods far more restrained. The country formally permitted it only when authorized by the monarch, and no more than 81 torture warrants were issued (for all offenses) throughout English history. The death toll in Scotland dwarfed that of England. It is also apparent from an episode of English history, that during the civil war in the early 1640s, witch-hunters emerged, the most notorious of whom was Matthew Hopkins from East Anglia and proclaimed himself the "Witchfinder General".

Italy has had fewer witchcraft accusations, and even fewer cases where witch trials ended in execution. In 1542, the establishment of the Roman Catholic Inquisition effectively restrained secular courts under its influence from liberal application of torture and execution. The methodological Instructio, which served as an "appropriate" manual for witch hunting, cautioned against hasty convictions and careless executions of the accused. In contrast with other parts of Europe, trials by the Venetian Holy Office never saw conviction for the crime of malevolent witchcraft, or "maleficio". Because the notion of diabolical cults was not credible to either popular culture or Catholic inquisitorial theology, mass accusations and belief in Witches' Sabbath never took root in areas under such inquisitorial influence.

The number of people tried for witchcraft between the years of 1500–1700 (by region) include: Holy Roman Empire: 50,000 Poland: 15,000 Switzerland: 9,000 French Speaking Europe: 10,000 Spanish and Italian peninsulas: 10,000 Scandinavia: 4,000.

=== Socio-political turmoil ===
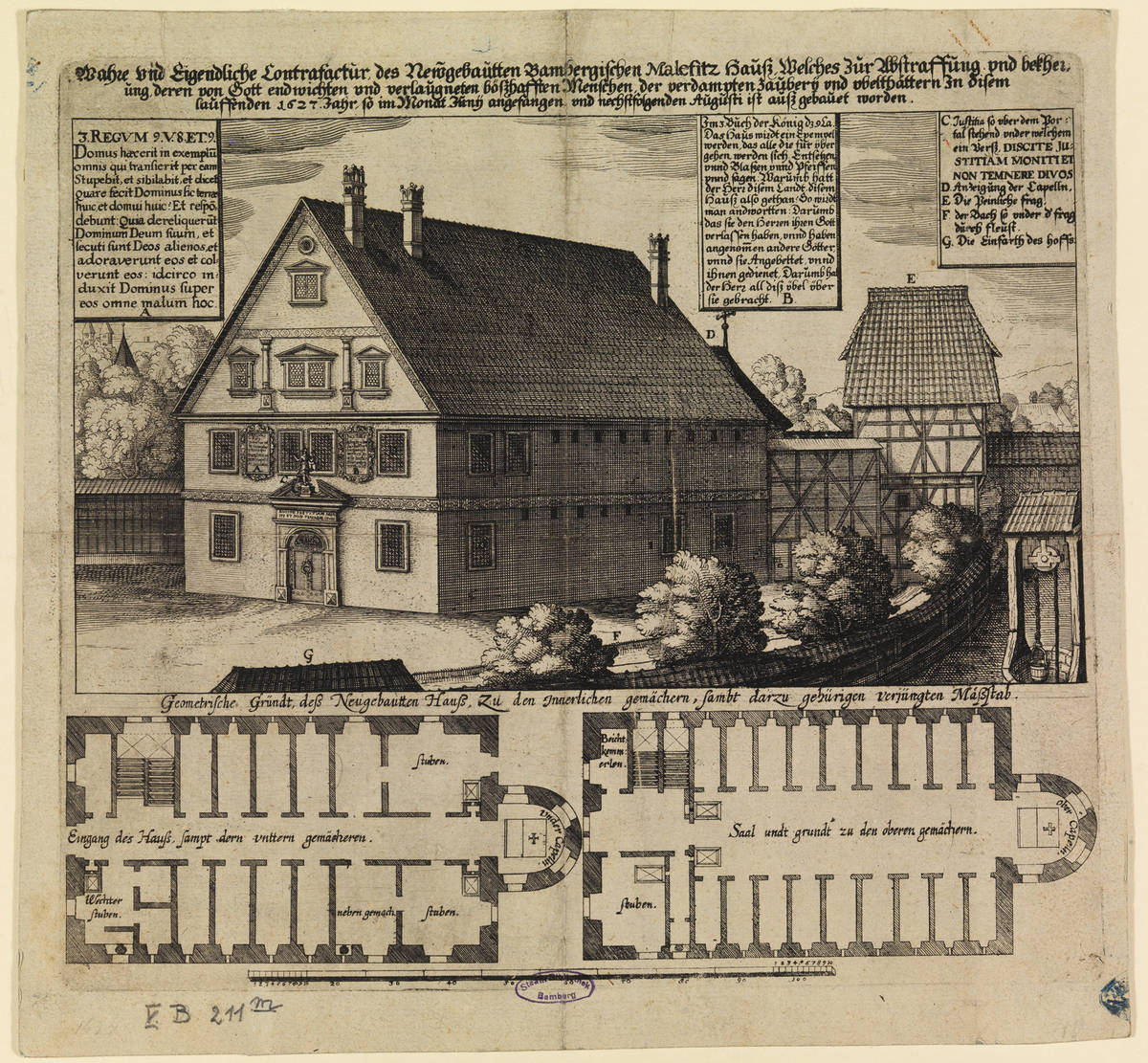
The malefizhaus of Bamberg, Germany, where suspected witches were held and interrogated: 1627 engraving

Various suggestions have been made that the witch trials emerged as a response to socio-political turmoil in the Early Modern world. One form of this is that the prosecution of witches was a reaction to a disaster that had befallen the community, such as crop failure, war, or disease. For instance, Midelfort suggested that in southwestern Germany, war and famine destabilised local communities, resulting in the witch prosecutions of the 1620s. Behringer also suggests an increase in witch prosecutions due to socio-political destabilization, stressing the Little Ice Age's effects on food shortages, and the subsequent use of witches as scapegoats for consequences of climatic changes.

The Little Ice Age, lasting from about 1300 to 1850, is characterized by temperatures and precipitation levels lower than the 1901–1960 average. Scholars such as Wolfgang Behringer, Emily Oster, and Hartmut Lehmann argue that these cooling temperatures brought about crop failure, war, and disease, and that witches were subsequently blamed for this turmoil. Historical temperature indexes and witch trial data indicate that, generally, as temperature decreased during this period, witch trials increased. Additionally, the peaks of witchcraft persecutions overlap with hunger crises that occurred in 1570 and 1580, the latter lasting a decade. Problematically for these theories, it has been highlighted that, in that region, the witch hunts declined during the 1630s, at a time when the communities living there were facing increased disaster as a result of plague, famine, economic collapse, and the Thirty Years' War. Furthermore, this scenario would clearly not offer a universal explanation, for trials also took place in areas which were free from war, famine, or pestilence. Additionally, these theories—particularly Behringer's —have been labeled as oversimplified. Although there is evidence that the Little Ice Age and subsequent famine and disease was likely a contributing factor to increase in witch persecution, Durrant argues that one cannot make a direct link between these problems and witch persecutions in all contexts.

Moreover, the average age at first marriage had gradually risen by the late sixteenth century; the population had stabilized after a period of growth, and availability of jobs and land had lessened. In the last decades of the century, the age at marriage had climbed to averages of 25 for women and 27 for men in England and the Low Countries, as more people married later or remained unmarried due to lack of money or resources and a decline in living standards, and these averages remained high for nearly two centuries and averages across Northwestern Europe had done likewise. The convents were closed during the Protestant Reformation, which displaced many nuns. Many communities saw the proportion of unmarried women climb from less than 10% to 20% and in some cases as high as 30%, whom few communities knew how to accommodate economically. Miguel (2003) argues that witch killings may be a process of eliminating the financial burdens of a family or society, via elimination of the older women that need to be fed, and an increase in unmarried women would enhance this process.

=== Catholic versus Protestant conflict ===
The English historian Hugh Trevor-Roper advocated the idea that the witch trials emerged as part of the conflicts between Roman Catholics and Protestants in Early Modern Europe. A 2017 study in the Economic Journal, examining "more than 43,000 people tried for witchcraft across 21 European countries over a period of five-and-a-half centuries", found that "more intense religious-market contestation led to more intense witch-trial activity. And, compared to religious-market contestation, the factors that existing hypotheses claim were important for witch-trial activity—weather, income, and state capacity—were not."

Until recently, this theory received limited support from other experts in the subject. This is because there is little evidence that either Roman Catholics were accusing Protestants of witchcraft, or that Protestants were accusing Roman Catholics. Furthermore, the witch trials regularly occurred in regions with little or no inter-denominational strife, and which were largely religiously homogeneous, such as Essex, Lowland Scotland, Geneva, Venice, and the Spanish Basque Country. There is also some evidence, particularly from the Holy Roman Empire, in which adjacent Roman Catholic and Protestant territories were exchanging information on alleged local witches, viewing them as a common threat to both. Additionally, many prosecutions were instigated not by the religious or secular authorities, but by popular demands from within the population, thus making it less likely that there were specific inter-denominational reasons behind the accusations.

The more recent research from the 2017 study in the Economic Journal argues that both Catholics and Protestants used the hunt for witches, regardless of the witch's denomination, in competitive efforts to expand power and influence.

In south-western Germany, between 1561 and 1670, there were 480 witch trials. Of the 480 trials that took place in southwestern Germany, 317 occurred in Catholic areas and 163 in Protestant territories. During the period from 1561 to 1670, at least 3,229 persons were executed for witchcraft in the German Southwest. Of this number, 702 were tried and executed in Protestant territories and 2,527 in Catholic territories.

=== Translation from the Hebrew: Witch or poisoner? ===
It has been argued that a translation choice in the King James Bible justified "horrific human rights violations and fuel[ed] the epidemic of witchcraft accusations and persecution across the globe". The translation issue concerned Exodus 22:18, "do not suffer a ...[either 1) poisoner or 2) witch] ...to live," Both the King James and the Geneva Bible, which precedes the King James version by 51 years, chose the word "witch" for this verse. The proper translation and definition of the Hebrew word מְכַשֵּׁפָ֖ה (məḵaššêp̄āh) in Exodus 22:18 was much debated during the time of the trials and witch-phobia.

=== 1970s folklore emphasis ===
From the 1970s onward, there was a "massive explosion of scholarly enthusiasm" for the study of the Early Modern witch trials. This was partly because scholars from a variety of different disciplines, including sociology, anthropology, cultural studies, philosophy, philosophy of science, criminology, literary theory, and feminist theory, all began to investigate the phenomenon and brought different insights to the subject. This was accompanied by analysis of the trial records and the socio-cultural contexts on which they emerged, allowing for varied understanding of the trials.

=== Functionalism ===
Inspired by ethnographically recorded witch trials that anthropologists observed happening in non-European parts of the world, various historians have sought a functional explanation for the Early Modern witch trials, thereby suggesting the social functions that the trials played within their communities. These studies have illustrated how accusations of witchcraft have played a role in releasing social tensions or in facilitating the termination of personal relationships that have become undesirable to one party.

=== Feminist interpretations ===
Throughout the 19th and 20th centuries, various feminist interpretations of the witch trials have been offered and published. One of the earliest individuals to do so was the American Matilda Joslyn Gage, a writer who was deeply involved in the first-wave feminist movement for women's suffrage. In 1893, she published the book Woman, Church and State, which was criticized as "written in a tearing hurry and in time snatched from a political activism which left no space for original research". Likely influenced by the works of Jules Michelet about the witch-cult, she claimed that the witches persecuted in the Early Modern period were pagan priestesses adhering to an ancient religion venerating a Great Goddess. She also repeated the erroneous statement, taken from the works of several German authors, that nine million people had been killed in the witch hunt. The United States has become the centre of development for these feminist interpretations.

In 1973, two American second-wave feminists, Barbara Ehrenreich and Deirdre English, published an extended pamphlet in which they put forward the idea that the women persecuted had been the traditional healers and midwives of the community, who were being deliberately eliminated by the male medical establishment. This theory disregarded the fact that the majority of those persecuted were neither healers nor midwives, and that in various parts of Europe these individuals were commonly among those encouraging the persecutions. In 1994, Anne Llewellyn Barstow published her book Witchcraze, which was later described by Scarre and Callow as "perhaps the most successful" attempt to portray the trials as a systematic male attack on women.

Other feminist historians have rejected this interpretation of events; historian Diane Purkiss described it as "not politically helpful" because it constantly portrays women as "helpless victims of patriarchy" and thus does not aid them in contemporary feminist struggles. She also condemned it for factual inaccuracy by highlighting that radical feminists adhering to it ignore the historicity of their claims, instead promoting it because it is perceived as authorising the continued struggle against patriarchal society. She asserted that many radical feminists nonetheless clung to it because of its "mythic significance" and firmly delineated structure between the oppressor and the oppressed.

=== Male and Female conflict and reaction to earlier feminist studies ===
An estimated 75% to 85% of those accused in the early modern witch trials were women, (Note: According to R. W. Thurston, 75–80% of the victims across both Europe and North America were women, Thurston 2001. p. 42. According to Anne Llewellyn Barstow, 80% of those accused and 85% of those executed in Europe were women. Barstow, Anne Llewellyn (1994) Witchcraze: A New History of the European Witch Hunts San Francisco: Pandora. p. 23) and there is certainly evidence of misogyny on the part of those persecuting witches, evident from quotes such as "[It is] not unreasonable that this scum of humanity, [witches], should be drawn chiefly from the feminine sex" (Nicholas Rémy, c. 1595) or "The Devil uses them so, because he knows that women love carnal pleasures, and he means to bind them to his allegiance by such agreeable provocations." Scholar Kurt Baschwitz, in his first monography on the subject (in Dutch, 1948), mentions this aspect of the witch trials even as "a war against old women".

Nevertheless, it has been argued that the supposedly misogynistic agenda of works on witchcraft has been greatly exaggerated, based on the selective repetition of a few relevant passages of the Malleus maleficarum. There are various reasons as to why this was the case. In Early Modern Europe, it was widely believed that women were less intelligent than men and more susceptible to sin. Many modern scholars argue that the witch hunts cannot be explained simplistically as an expression of male misogyny, as indeed women were frequently accused by other women, to the point that witch-hunts, at least at the local level of villages, have been described as having been driven primarily by "women's quarrels". Especially at the margins of Europe, in Iceland, Finland, Estonia, and Russia, the majority of those accused were male.

Barstow (1994) claimed that a combination of factors, including the greater value placed on men as workers in the increasingly wage-oriented economy, and a greater fear of women as inherently evil, loaded the scales against women, even when the charges against them were identical to those against men. Thurston (2001) saw this as a part of the general misogyny of the Late Medieval and Early Modern periods, which had increased during what he described as "the persecuting culture" from which it had been in the Early Medieval. Gunnar Heinsohn and Otto Steiger, in a 1982 publication, speculated that witch-hunts targeted women skilled in midwifery specifically in an attempt to extinguish knowledge about birth control and "repopulate Europe" after the population catastrophe of the Black Death; this view has been rejected by mainstream historians. The historian of medicine David Harley criticised the notion of the midwife-witch as a prevalent type of victim of witch hunts and commented on Heinsohn and Steiger as belonging to a set of polemicists who misportrayed the history of midwifery.

=== Witch-cult hypothesis ===
Throughout the eighteenth and nineteenth centuries, the common belief among the educated sectors of the European populace was that there had never been any genuine cult of witches and all of those people who were persecuted and executed as such were innocent of the crime of witchcraft. In the mid-nineteenth century, German Professor Karl Ernst Jarcke suggested that witchcraft had been a pre-Christian German religion that had degenerated into Satanism, sparking a short-lived period of scholarship re-examining the witch trials in this light. Jarcke's ideas were picked up by the German historian Franz Josef Mone in 1839, although he argued that the cult's origins were Greek rather than Germanic. In 1862, the Frenchman Jules Michelet published La Sorciere, in which he put forth the idea that the witches had been following a pagan religion.

The theory achieved greater attention when it was taken up by the Egyptologist Margaret Murray, who published both The Witch-Cult in Western Europe (1921) and The God of the Witches (1931) in which she claimed that the witches had been following a pre-Christian religion which she termed "the witch-cult" and "ritual witchcraft." However, the majority of scholarly reviews of Murray's work produced at the time were largely critical, and her books never received support from experts in the Early Modern witch trials. From her early publications onward, many of her ideas were challenged by those who highlighted her "factual errors and methodological failings." Despite this, her theory was published in the Encyclopaedia Britannica, leading to its popularization among lay audiences. Influencing works of literature, it inspired writings by Aldous Huxley and Robert Graves.

In the early 20th century, a number of individuals and groups emerged in Europe, primarily Britain, and subsequently the United States as well, claiming to be the surviving remnants of the pagan witch-cult described in the works of Margaret Murray. The first of these actually appeared in the last few years of the 19th century, being a manuscript that American folklorist Charles Leland claimed he had been given by a woman who was a member of a group of witches worshipping the god Lucifer and goddess Diana in Tuscany, Italy. He published the work in 1899 as Aradia, or the Gospel of the Witches. Whilst historians and folklorists have accepted that there are folkloric elements to the gospel, none have accepted it as being the text of a genuine Tuscan religious group, and believe it to be of late-nineteenth-century composition.

One of these alleged surviving groups, the New Forest Coven, inspired Gardnerian Wicca, one of the most prominent traditions in the contemporary pagan religion. Wiccans extended claims regarding the witch-cult in various ways, for instance by utilising the British folklore associating witches with prehistoric sites to assert that the witch-cult used to use such locations for religious rites, in doing so legitimising contemporary Wiccan use of them. By the 1990s, many Wiccans had come to recognise the inaccuracy of the witch-cult theory and had accepted it as a mythological origin story.

== Witch trials by country or region ==
- Bideford witch trial
- Salem witch trials
- Witch trials in Virginia
- Maryland witch trials
- Pennsylvania witch trials
- Witch trials in Denmark
- Witch trials in England
- Witch trials in Finland
- Witch trials in France
- Witch trials in the Holy Roman Empire
- Witch trials in Hungary
- Witch trials in Iceland
- Witch trials in Italy
- Witch trials in Latvia and Estonia
- Witch-hunts in Nepal
- Witch trials in the Netherlands
- Witch trials in Norway
- Witch trials in Poland
- Witch trials in Portugal
- Witch trials in early modern Scotland
- Witch trials in Sicily
- Witch trials in Spain
- Witch trials in the Spanish Netherlands
- Witch trials in Sweden

== See also ==
- List of common misconceptions
- Conspiracy theory
- Blood libel
- List of conspiracy theories
- False accusation
- Fear mongering
- Gendercide
- Labeling theory
- Mass hysteria
- List of mass hysteria cases
- Moral panic
- Witchcraft Acts
- Role of women in Catharism
- Magic and religion
- Christian views on magic
- Modern witch-hunts
- Margaret Mattson
- Social panic
- Social stigma
- Satanic panic
- Violence against women
- Witch-hunt
- Women and religion
- Women in Christianity
- Thomas Ady
- Anton Praetorius
- Catelijne Verbauwen
