= Jacquier =

Jacquier is a French surname. Notable people with the surname include:

- Élodie Jacquier-Laforge (born 1978), French politician
- François Jacquier (1711–1788), French mathematician
- Gilles Jacquier (1968–2012), French journalist
- Nicholas Jacquier (died 1472), French Dominican, Inquisitor and demonologist
- Paul Jacquier (1879–1961), French politician
