= Magda Logomer =

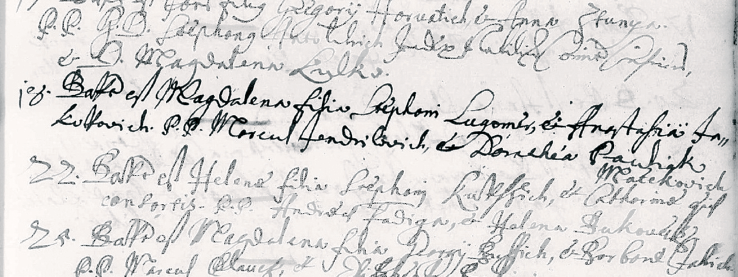
- Born: 18 May 1706; Križevci
- Other name: Herucina
- Occupations: Herbalist, healer
- Known for: condemned for witchcraft

Magda Logomer, born 18 May 1706 in Križevci (modern Croatia), also known as Herucina, was a herbalist from the town of Križevci, who was accused by her neighbor of practising witchcraft and poisoning.

Logomer was tortured and condemned to death in 1758, before the intervention of Maria Theresa. She wrote a letter on 23 November 1758 confirming her acquittal and authorizing her to go back to her home in Križevci under special protection.

Magda Logomer's trial is considered to have ended the massive persecutions of witches in Croatia. Her case is known because of the publishing of doctor Gerard van Swieten's report at the end of 1913. The doctor examined and treated Magda Logomer on the queen's request following the tortures she was submitted to, and by the correspondence between the high officials of the Kingdom of Croatia and the Court of Vienna.

Her story was also told by Marija Jurić Zagorka in her popular novel about witches in Zagreb.

== Biography ==
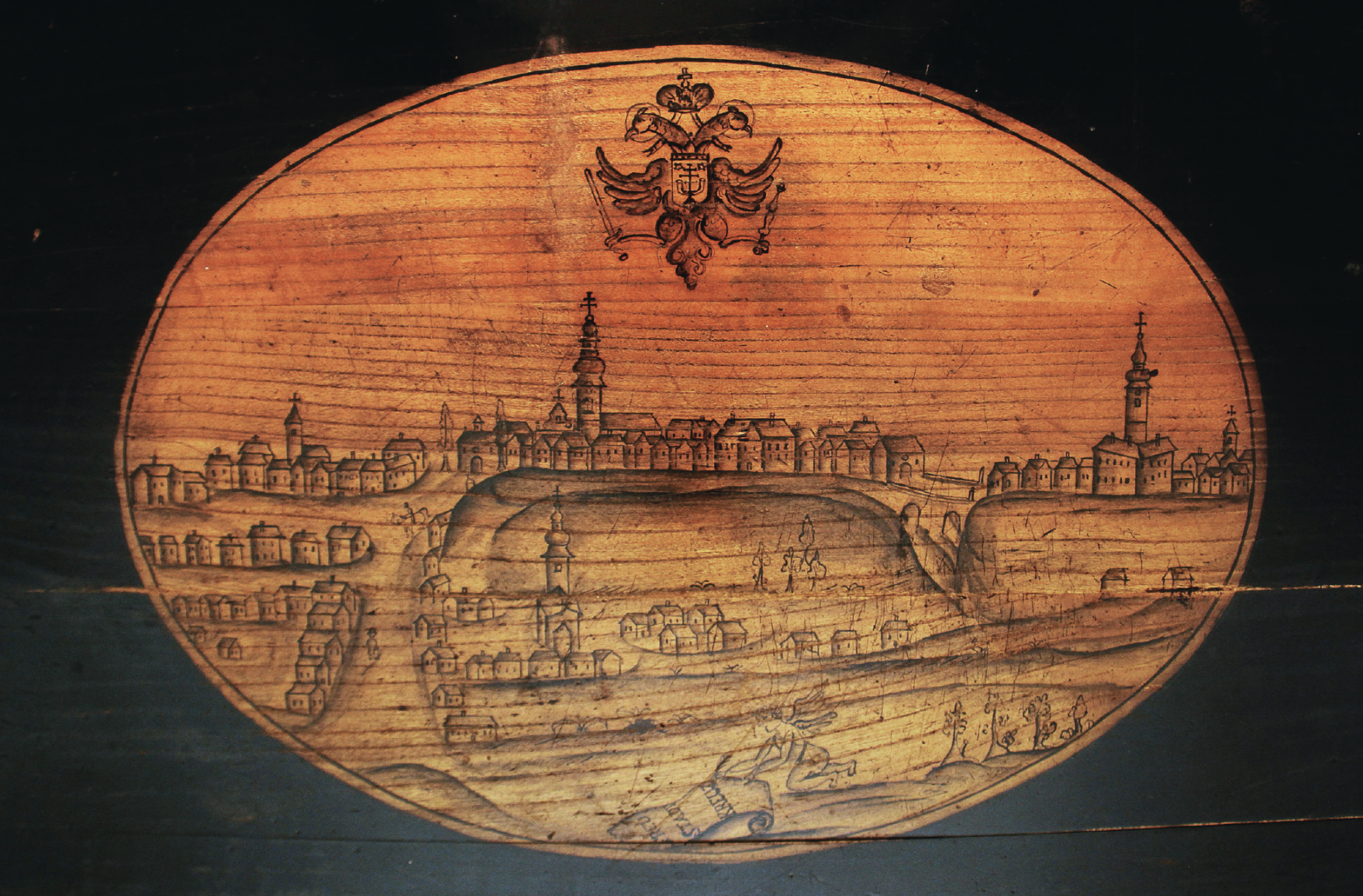
Križevci around 1755

Magda Logomer was born on 18 May 1706 in Podgajec, in the Kingdom of Croatia of Austro-hungarian empire. Her parents as per the baptismal register are Stephan Logomer and Anastasia Jankovich.

=== Origin of the name «Herucina» ===
Herucina's nickname probably came from her husband's original residence. She married Franjo Heruc in 1727. Thus, the name Herucina can be interpreted as merely indicating her husband's name. However, another explanation remains possible: on the cadastre of 1857 between Podgajec and the hamlet of Brckovčina one can find a place named "Heruc". Franjo Heruc had his registered residence in Brckovčina, and the addition of Heruc could just mean Magda Logomer came "from Heruc".

=== Local historical context in Krizevci ===
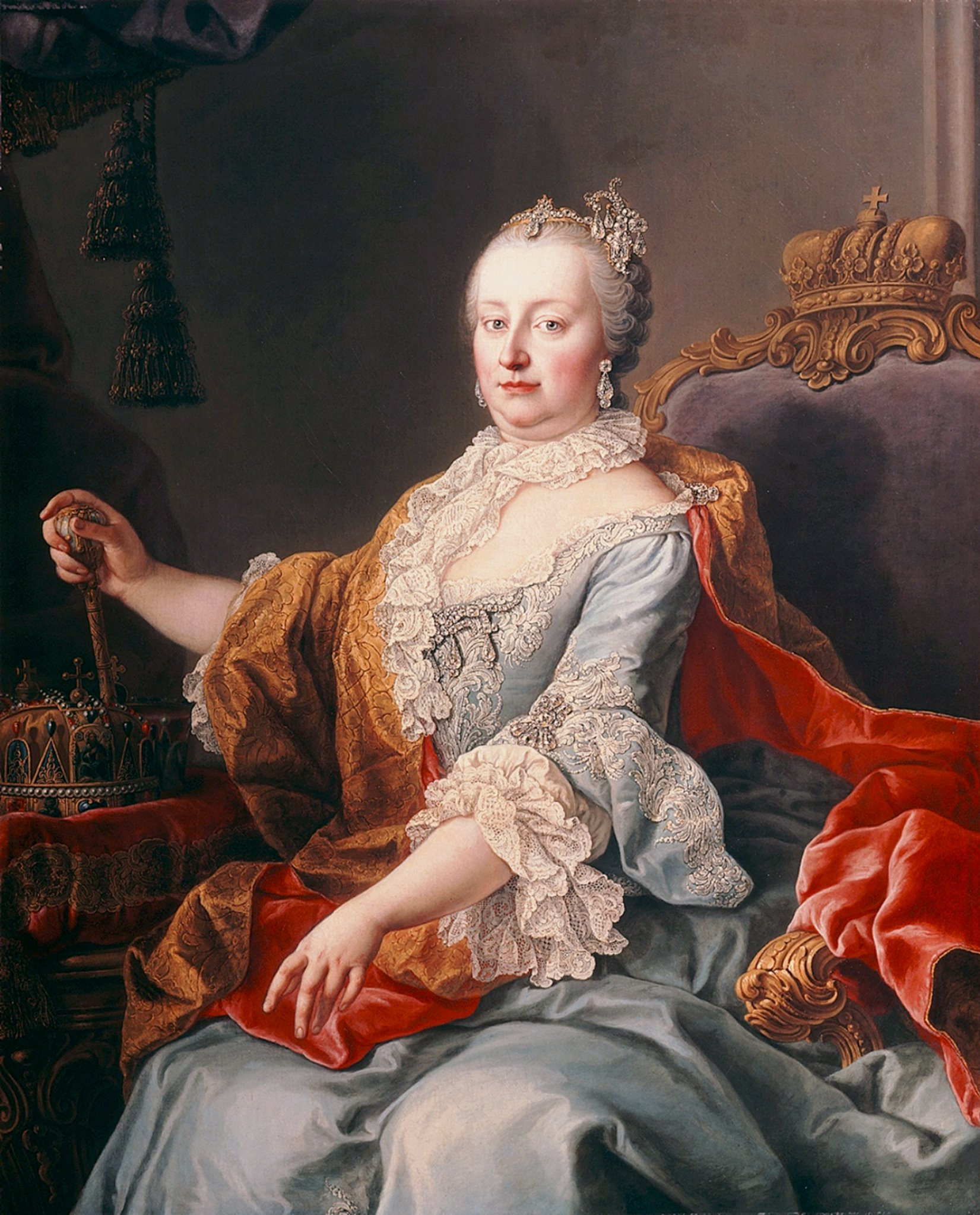
Empress Maria Theresia in 1759

Magda Logomer's life took place in a turbulent environment. In 1735, a fire destroyed a third of the city. Around 1740-41 witch trials led to the execution of 13 women. In 1752 Maria Theresa unified the upper and lower town, which took the name Križevci. In 1755 another fire ravaged the estates between Križevci, Vrbovec and Bisag, and a peasant revolt broke out. During this period, new churches were built. Nikola Benger, who was born in 1695 in Križevci and died in 1766 at Lepoglava was a historian and Pauline monk. He provided historical accounts of that time and place.

There are two historical chronicles at that time from different persons which do not mention the case of Herucina at all. One account stems from the parish priest of Križevci, Ivan Josipović, which dealt mainly with intervillage affairs, and the other account is from Balthazar Adam Krčelić, which includes notes on Croatian affairs. The scope of the case is therefore rather a matter of interference of Maria Theresa of Austria in local affairs.

==== Handling of alleged witchcraft cases ====
At that time, many intellectuals denied the existence of witches, and although Maria Theresa of Austria personally believed in their existence, she was suspicious of the way the trials were conducted. 63 witches were prosecuted under the witchcraft laws between 1740 and 1752, in the counties of Zagreb, Varaždin and Križevci, at the time when persecution was at its peak in the region. In neighboring Hungary, a wave of persecution took place between 1720 and 1730, and again in 1740, 450 alleged witches were prosecuted. All these trials were conducted with cruel interrogation methods based on torture, which was legal under the Habsburg monarchy in Croatia, but codified by strict legal rules according to the code of Ferdinand.

No more than three consecutive tortures are allowed, and the order of instruments used is strictly codified. The rules also require strict record keeping detailing the instruments and methods of torture used, and the precise dates and times. These rules provided documentation for the examination of Magda Logomer's case. Examples of instruments used for torture included wheel and dismemberment, and the tourniquet, which consisted of tightening the neck with a screw and gradually increasing the pressure.

=== Marriage ===
Magda married Franjo Heruc, (born around 1700, died on 9 February 1727). She was 21 years old. They had 6 children: Margaret born in 1727, Jakob in 1733, Barbara in 1735, Emerik in 1740, Katarina in 1743 and Matthias in 1746. It is not known how many of them reached adulthood, although it is known that their daughter Barbara survived, since she testified at her mother's trial.

Magda Logomer practiced as a herbalist and prepared remedies for her patients, who were generally satisfied. While the practice of herbalism was not forbidden, it was forbidden to make poisons, and when a person was suspected of being a witch, being an herbalist was often a factor leading to suspicion and an aggravating factor.

=== Indictment and trial for witchcraft ===
Being herbalist meant in practice collecting grasses and making remedies, but it is not known how she was trained for this profession, which required a good knowledge of plants. It was known, however, that her clients appreciated her knowledge and recommended her, and that she passed on her knowledge to her daughter Barbara, who sometimes helped her in her business.

Several reports from previous court proceedings highlighted her personality. She was once imprisoned following a physical altercation with another woman whom she had hit, escaping with a warning. During the trial, Magda admitted that she had hit another woman, Eva Oblacic so hard that she lost consciousness. She also had a previous fight with her godfather, Matija Sunsić, who was a cooper over a wooden tub. She also had a problematic relationship with judge Stjepan Švagel. Matija Sunsić, a witness at the trial, stated that Magda confessed to him that only fear of Švagel prevented her from using her healing skills. The average life expectancy at that time in Križevci was 40 to 50 years, and Magda was 51 years old at the time of her trial, having had her last child at 40, so she was in good health.

Another aspect to be taken into account is the fact that as a witness to the executions of witches in the city between 1740 and 1741, she may have been aware of the dangers of her profession. She could also have been aware of the fear rooted in the superstitions that people held about suspected witches. She could therefore have used this fear for her own interest, but also sought to resolve disputes by paying compensation in order to avoid being accused of witchcraft, elements that were found in several of her physical altercations.

Magda Logomer was accused by one of her neighbors, Eva Oblačić of practicing black magic. Eva Oblačić was convinced that Magda poisoned her, and described being pestered by Magda while she was in bed with a fever, Magda Logomer turning into a fly and twirling around her head. An investigation was carried out during a trial, and many people confirmed that they had witnessed Magda Logomer's allegedly diabolical actions. Magda's lawyers pointed out that Empress Maria Theresa had not been informed of the trial as required by the new rules imposed by Maria Theresa upon her accession to the throne, but all this was in vain. Magda Logomer was tortured and confessed to having sexual relationship with the devil. Marks of the devil were found on her body, and she was sentenced to death on 22 April 1758.

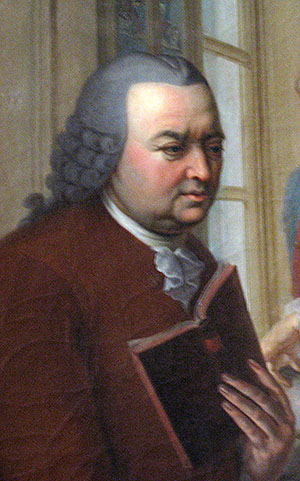
Doctor Gerard van Swieten, the personal doctor of Maria Theresa who examined Magda Logomer at her request.

Magda Logomer was sent to a medical clinic, and Gerard van Swieten, the personal physician of Maria Theresa of Austria, examined her. He reported to the queen about the torture she had suffered and later published. On 9 June 1758, Maria Theresa was informed of the case and ordered Count Franjo Nadaždi, then ban of the kingdom, to send Magda to her so that she could meet her in person. Magda was examined by De Haen, a professor of medicine, and Gerard Van Swieten, who was also the court expert on witchcraft in addition to being the personal physician of the empress. The examination revealed many details of which the empress was not informed, as well as the torture inflicted, which left Magda with numerous injuries. The two experts reported their examination to Maria Theresa, and stated that the magistrate of the Križevci court was superstitious. Gerard Van Swieten believed in witchcraft, but doubted that witches could fly with brooms and cause bad weather, and had been dedicated to convince Maria Theresa of the necessity to abolish witch trials leading to executions.

On 23 November 1758, the Empress in a letter addressed to the ban of Croatia acquitted Magda and sent her back home to Križevci under special protection.

This conclusion was part of the more general fight against superstition and the affirmation of the central power of Maria Theresa. The letter stopped the witch trials because it meant that local court would have to spend money and energy to defend their verdict in Vienna with low chances of the verdict being confirmed by the empress Maria Theresa.

=== End of life ===
There is little information about the end of Magda Logomer's life, and her date of death is not known. However, the records show that her husband died two years after her return, as did two of the people who had accused her, which must not have made her social reintegration any easier, given the local rumors and suspicions of witchcraft against her.

== Historical context of witch hunts ==
The trials of witches were in general fast and expeditious. The kingdom of Croatia was a territory forming part of the Habsburg monarchy and then of the Austrian empire from 1527, and was governed in personal union with Hungary by the sovereigns of the house of Habsburg. However, it had the right of the sword Ius gladii. It could conduct trials without interference, pronounce death sentences without having to refer to a higher court of the Austro-Hungarian or Croatian monarchy.

Marie Thérèse wanted to eradicate superstition in her kingdom, and hunting witches and black magic was no longer her priority. She obliged all death sentences for witchcraft to be validated by her only authority. This marked the decline of witch hunts everywhere in Europe, and if it is undeniable that the philosophy of the Enlightenment played a role, one should not minimize the instrumentalization of the condemnation of witch trials to provide for the reinforcement of the power of a central state over local jurisdictions, with the asserted will to fight against superstition.

In 1740, the same year that Frederick the Great prohibited the use of torture in witch trials, Maria Theresa issued a decree specifying that all witchcraft cases were to be dealt with solely under imperial jurisdiction. In 1766 this decree was reinforced by a General Ordinance on the attitude to be adopted, which stated:

During our reign no authentic sorcerer has ever been discovered, but trials of this kind have always been based on deception due to the wickedness, stupidity or insanity of the accused or on some other vice.

However, she specified that care had to be taken to prevent any act of witchcraft. The use of torture was not formally abolished until 1776. In 1787, Joseph II dismantled the entire legal arsenal dedicated to black magic and witchcraft.

== Posterity ==
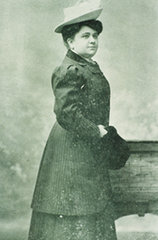
Marija Jurić Zagorka

Marija Jurić Zagorka published Grička Vještica (The Witch of Grič ) based on real historical facts. The case of Magda Logomer is known because of the legal developments that came after her trial. There are no further traces of legal persecutions of witches in Croatia, although it is not certain that there were none. In any case, as no historical traces of them have been preserved, this trial marks the end of alleged witch persecutions in Croatia. The report of Dr. Gerard van Swieten was published in 1913 and 1924 in the newspaper Obzor, and the case is discussed in the correspondence between the high officials of the Kingdom of Croatia and the Court of Vienna, these documents constituting historical records. Later on, popular novels mentioned the case. Marija Jurić Zagorka, a Croatian writer, noticed the publication of Gerard van Swieten's report. Between 1912 and 1914 she published Grička Vještica ("The Witch of Grič") in the form of serialized novels in the daily newspaper Male novine ("the little newspaper"). In these novels, she evokes in fictionalized form several historical figures of witches, some under their real names and others under fictional names, including Herucina. The involvement of Maria Theresa of Austria in the cancellation of the verdict of a trial is mentioned.

== See also ==
- Modern witch-hunts
- Witch trials in Hungary
- Szeged witch trials

== Bibliography ==
- Arnould, Colette (2017). Histoire de la sorcellerie (in French). France. ISBN 979-10-210-2774-9. OCLC 1191840198..
- Kern, Edmund M. (1999). "An End to Witch Trials in Austria: Reconsidering the Enlightened State". Austrian History Yearbook. 30 (published 10 February 2009): 159–185. doi:10.1017/S006723780001599X. ISSN 1558-5255. PMID 21180204..
- Balog, Zdenko (2017-02-01). "Magda Logomer Herucina". Cris XVIII.
- Ankarloo, Bengt & Henningsen, Gustav (ed.), Skrifter. Bd. 13, Häxornas Europa 1400-1700: historiska och antropologiska studier, Stockholm: Nerenius & Santérus, 1987.
- Häxornas Europa 1400-1700 : historiska och antropologiska studier. Bengt Ankarloo, Gustav Henningsen. Stockholm: A.-B. Nordiska Bokhandeln. 1987. ISBN 91-85190-32-2. OCLC 22289815..
