= Witch trials in Hungary =

The Witch trials in Hungary were conducted over a longer period of time than in most countries in Europe, as documented witch trials are noted as early as the Middle Ages and lasted until the late 18th century. During the 16th and 17th centuries Hungary was divided into three parts: Habsburg Hungary, Ottoman Hungary and Transylvania, with some differences between them in regard to the witch hunt. The most intense period of witch hunts in Hungary took place in the 18th-century, at a time when they were rare in the rest of Europe except Poland. The trials finally stopped in 1768 by abolition of the death penalty for witchcraft by Austria, which controlled Hungary at the time. An illegal witch trial and execution took place in 1777.

== Chronology ==
Magic was banned by king Stephen I of Hungary when Hungary became a Christian country in the 11th century, but only if magic was used to cause someone's death (maleficium and veneficium).

King Coloman of Hungary (reign 1095–1116), prohibited in decrees the persecution of strigae – vampires or mares – because they "do not exist".

While witch trials were generally uncommon in Europe during the Middle Ages, at least fifteen executions by burning for witchcraft are documented between 1360 and 1437, most of which in present-day Croatia.

The witch hunt in Hungary became more intense in the late 16th -century, but was in its most intense phase between 1690 and 1750. Between 1520 and 1780, 1.644 people (1482 women and 160 men) are documented to have been put on trial for sorcery in Hungary, but the undocumented cases are estimated to be at least 800 cases. The most famous case was perhaps the Szeged witch trials of 1728, in which 13 people were burned at the stake.

== Regional situation ==
Between 1526 and 1699, Hungary was divided in three parts: Northern Hungary (Croatia, Slovenia and Slovakia), which belonged to Austria; Southern Hungary, which belonged to the Ottoman Empire; and Eastern Hungary (Transylvania) which was an autonomous Princely state under Ottoman rule. In 1699, Hungary was again united under Austrian rule. Witch trials were conducted in all of these parts, with some differences in its practice.

Northern Hungary was affected by the severe witch trials of Catholic Austria. In Southern Hungary the Ottoman authorities lacked any interests in the Christian witchcraft persecutions, however in the Ottoman Empire religious minorities handled their own legal trials. In Transylvania, the city population was generally of German heritage, and the witch trials were conducted by the German church under influence from Germany, where the witch trials in the Holy Roman Empire were arguably the worst in Europe, and a Witchcraft Act was introduced in Transylvania in 1614.

From the 1690s, when Hungary was conquered from the Ottoman Empire and united under Austrian rule, the Austrian Witchcraft Act of 1656, the Practica Rerum Criminalum was applied in all of Hungary.

== Witch trials ==
In Hungary, a witchcraft case often originated from a conflict between individuals or families. In contrast to many other countries, they occurred in all classes of society, both among the peasantry, the merchant class as well as among the nobility, and a normal case was caused by a conflict between two people, in which one family accused a rival family from having caused them injury by the help of witchcraft. When an aristocrat was accused, they were defended by a lawyer and was more often able to summon witness to testify to their defense. It was also common for villages to be accused by Austrian soldiers which were quartered in the village. In witchcraft cases, it was not uncommon for commoners to successfully accuse aristocrats, and children to point out adults, which was otherwise uncommon. Among common victims of the witch trials were the folk healers (tudos), as was the Táltos, men and women who functioned as shamans, a position which still existed in Hungary from the pre-Christian Pagan Hungarian religion. The taltos claimed to regularly leave their body to attend gatherings of other taltos with whom they performed ritual conflicts, a phenomenon from Pagan belief which the authorities interpreted to be a Witches' Sabbath.

In Hungary, witch trials in the cities were conducted by the city courts, while witch trials in rural areas were conducted by the private feudal courts of the estates belonging to the nobility. The ordeal of water and torture was commonly used in Hungarian witch trials both to confess guilt and point out accomplices, and the method of execution was commonly burning at the stake or to be buried alive.

== End ==
In the mid 18th-century witch trials were commonly considered outdated in most of Europe except Poland, but in Hungary, they had reached their most intense stage. This was a matter of embarrassment to Austria (which controlled Hungary) and the royal court physician Gerard van Swieten convinced Empress Maria Theresa that the witch trials in Hungary must be stopped. This resulted in a royal command which summarily repelled Hungarian witchcraft convictions from 1756 onward, ending witchcraft executions, and finally in a law banning the death penalty for witchcraft in Hungary in 1768. Despite the law, however, an illegal witch trial was conducted which ended in an execution in Kesmark (Kežmarok) in 1777, which was to become the last witchcraft execution in Hungary.

== See also ==
- Witch trials in the early modern period
- Magda Logomer
