= Moosham Castle =

Medieval castle in Austria

Coordinates: 47.10204°N 13.70685°E

Schloss Moosham
- Unternberg, Salzburg; Austria
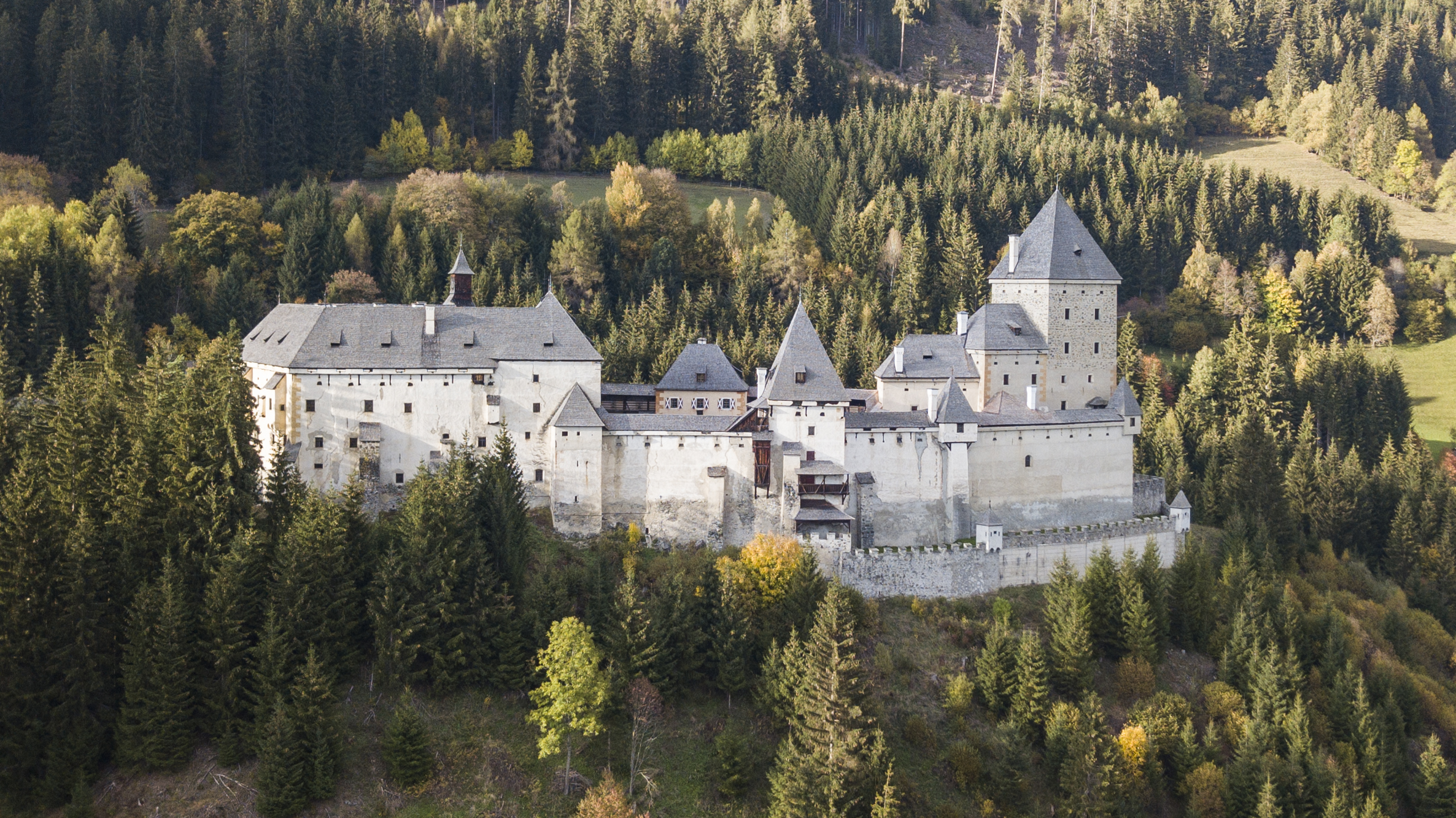
- Moosham Castle

Site information
- Type: Spur castle
- Owner: Private
- Open to the public: Yes
- Condition: Restored

Site history
- Built: c. 1191

Moosham Castle (German: Schloss Moosham) is a medieval castle near Unternberg in the Lungau region of Salzburg, Austria. The spur castle is situated at a height of 1,079 metres (3,540 ft).

== History ==
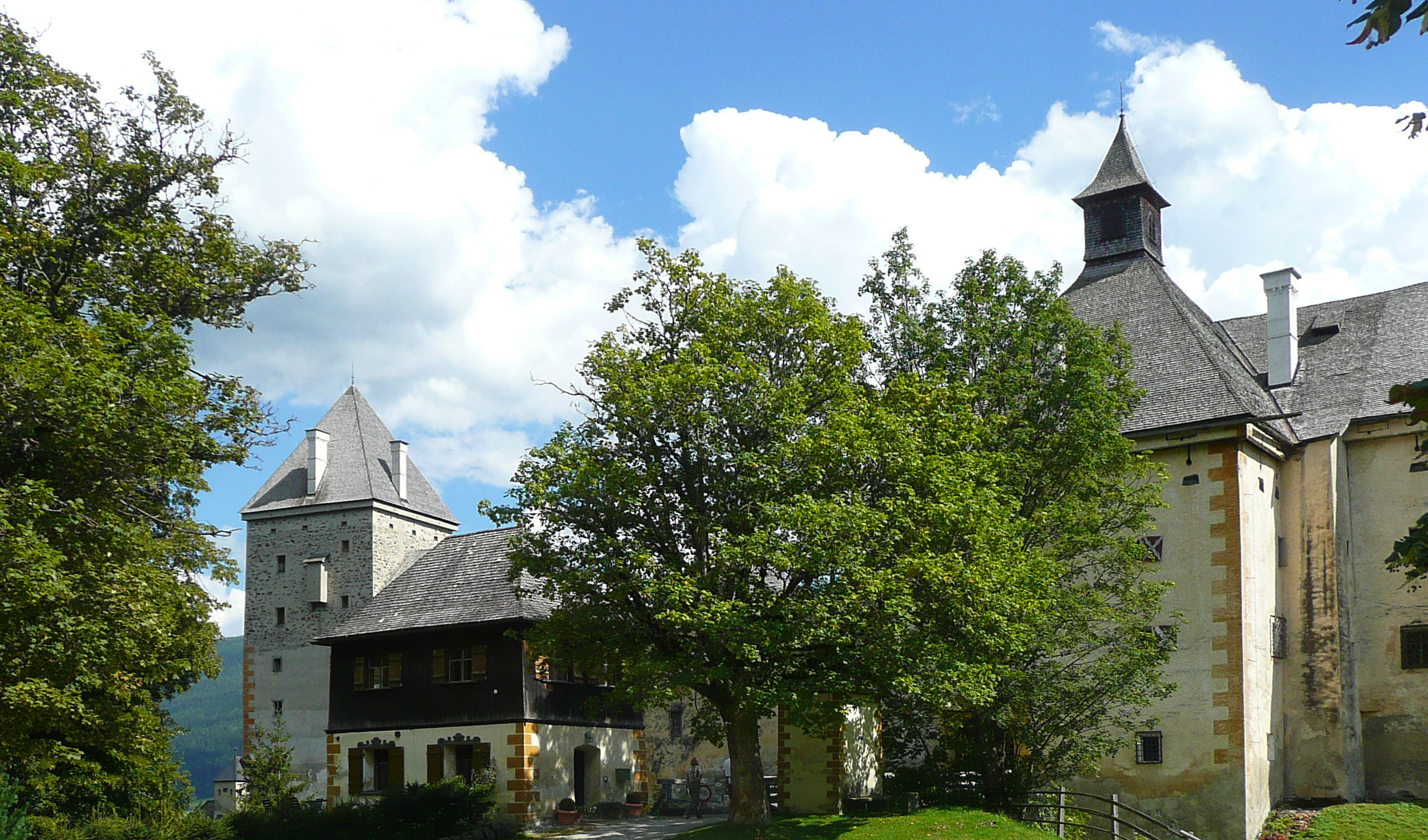
Entrance

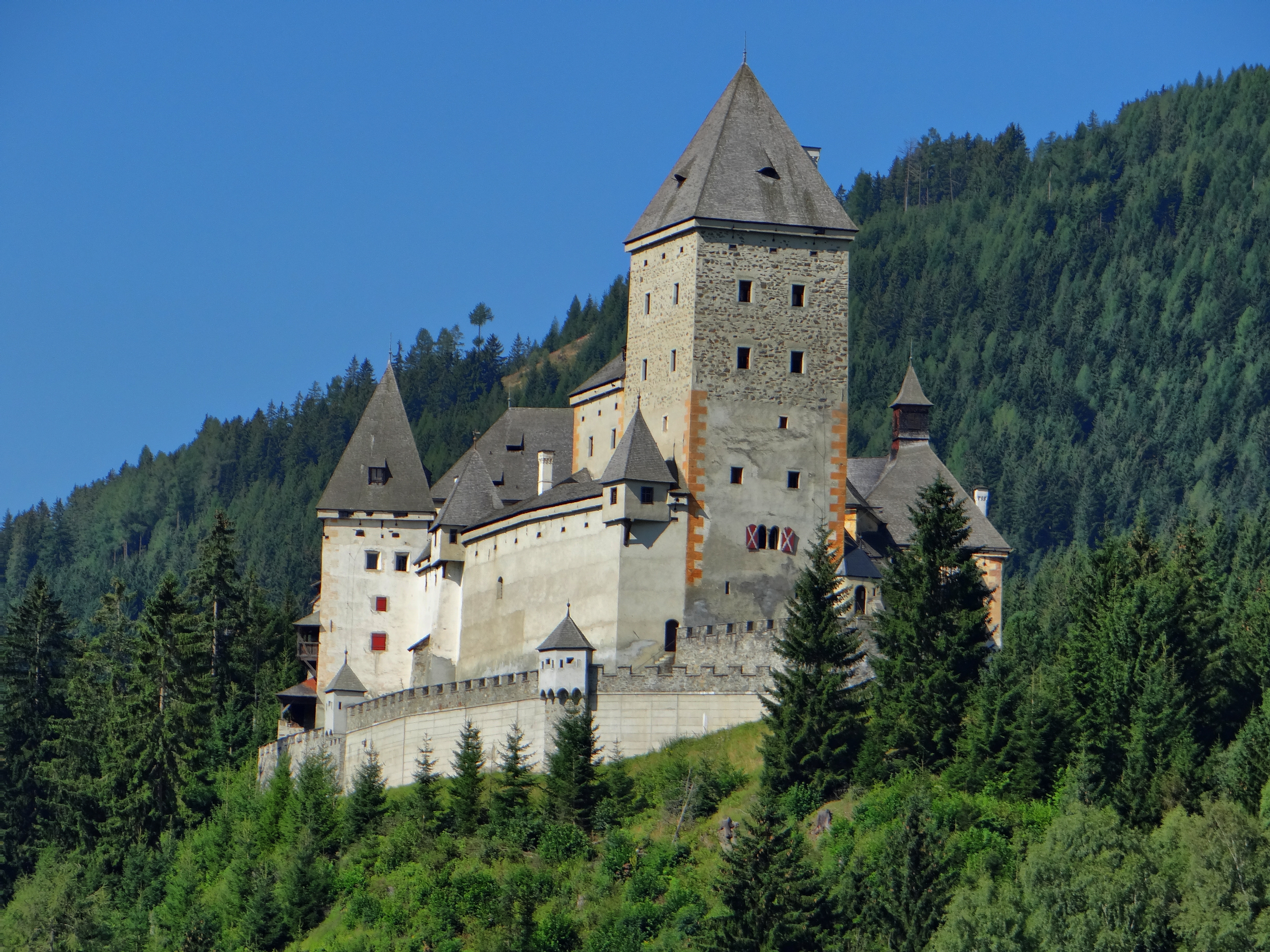
East view

Possibly built on the foundations of a Roman castrum fortress, the castle was first documented in an 1191 deed. It was seized by the Prince-Archbishops of Salzburg about 1285 and from the 14th century onwards served as the residence of an episcopal burgrave. Under the rule of Prince-Archbishop Leonhard von Keutschach from 1495, the castle was rebuilt and extended. In 1520, it became an administrative seat of the Lungau region and was besieged during the German Peasants' War of 1524–25. Archbishop Wolf Dietrich Raitenau stayed here on his flight from Salzburg in October 1611, shortly before he was captured.

Moosham Castle served as the administrative center during the Zaubererjackl witch trials between 1675 and 1690. These trials led to the execution of 139 people. Unusually, most of those executed were male. Among those executed, 39 were children (between 10 and 14 years old), 53 were teenagers and young adults (between 15 and 21), 21 of unknown age; 113 were of male gender; everyone except two were beggars. The youngest was Hannerl, 10 years old, and the oldest was Margarethe Reinberg, 80 years old. 109 were executed during 1681. They were tortured and burned; some of them alive, others after having been hanged or decapitated – some of them after having had their hands cut off and marked with a burning iron.

Archbishop Count Hieronymus von Colloredo dissolved the Moosham bailiwick in 1790, whereafter the castle decayed. In 1886, the Austrian explorer and patron of the arts Count Johann Nepomuk Wilczek purchased the ruin and had it restored. Up to today, the complex is private property, though its rooms featuring Wilczek's extensive art collection are accessible to the public.

== See also ==
- Burg Kreuzenstein
- List of castles in Austria
