= Gottfried Christian Voigt =

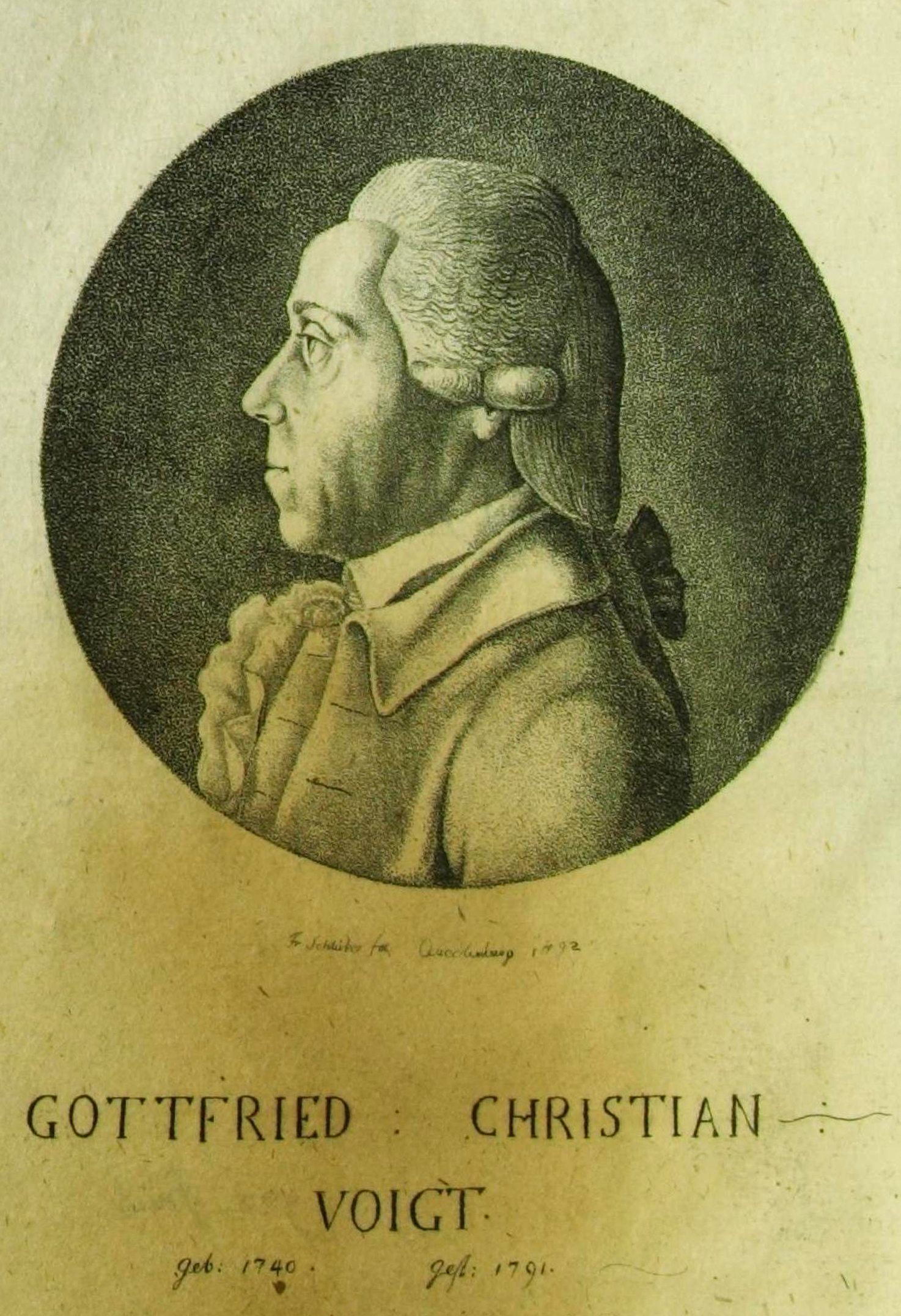
Gottfried Christian Voigt.

Gottfried Christian Voigt (1740–1791, pronunciation [foːkt]) was an 18th-century German law clerk of Quedlinburg, scholar and antiquarian, author of a 1791 "History of Quedlinburg Abbey" (Geschichte des Stifts Quedlinburg).

He is known as the source of the estimate of "nine million victims" in the European witch-hunts which became an influential popular myth in 20th century feminism and neopaganism. The history of this estimate was researched by Behringer (1998). Voigt published it in a 1784 article, writing in the context of the Age of Enlightenment, wishing to emphasize the importance of education in rooting out superstition and a relapse into the witch-craze which had subsided less than a lifetime ago in his day. He was criticizing Voltaire's estimate of "several hundred thousand" as too low. His extrapolation was based on finding evidence for thirty victims of witch trials in Quedlinburg, adding another ten victims, and then assuming the same rate of witch executions to population for the whole of Europe in the same century, and finally applying the same number of victims per century to eleven centuries.
