= Vauderie d'Arras =

Frontispiece of manuscript BnF, Ms Fr 961 of Johannes Tinctor’s Invectives Against the Sect of Waldensians, written during the trials. The image depicts some members of the sect of witches participating in the sabbath while others fly through the sky.

The Arras Witch Trials, known in French as the Vauderie d’Arras, are a series of witch trials that took place from 1459 to 1461 in the city of Arras in northern France, which was then part of the Burgundian Netherlands. These trials stand out for having taken place in a highly literate urban setting and for having involved people from different social backgrounds. Out of 29 defendants (of whom 10 were women), 12 were executed (of whom 8 were women).

== Denomination ==
The name "Vauderie d’Arras", by which the Arras witch trials are commonly known, derives from the French term vaudois, which was used to refer to the accused. This term originally designated followers of the Waldensian movement founded by Peter Waldo, but by the 15th century it had come to be used generically to refer to witches.

== Events timeline ==
=== First wave of arrests ===
In the fall of 1459, a Franciscan hermit named Robinet de Vaux was tried for witchcraft at a meeting of Dominicans in Langres. When forced to name his accomplices, he implicated a prostitute, Deniselle Grenier, and an elderly poet and visual artist named Jean Tannoye or Jean Lavite, both of whom lived in the vicinity of Arras. The inquisitor of Arras, Pierre le Broussard, happened to be present at the proceedings and decided to take action. He was assisted by the Dominican inquisitor Nicholas Jacquier, who in 1458 had completed his Flagellum hæreticorum fascinariorum, a treatise in which he argued for th reality of witchcraft. After being subjected to torture, the two defendants named many other accomplices. At that point, some members of the team of ecclesiastical judges began to worry about the consequences of their own actions and tried to slow down the persecution. However, Le Broussard had his own supporters, including the suffragan bishop of Arras Jean Fauconnier and a young theologian named Jacques du Bois, who argued passionately in favour of his measures. The churchmen in this group then turned to the secular authorities, whereupon Jean de Bourgogne, captain general of the marches of Picardy on behalf of the Duke of Burgundy, personally intervened to reignite the persecutions. In May 1460, having retracted the confessions they had made in exchange for a promise that their lives would be spared, five defendants were burnt at the stake.

=== Second wave of arrests ===
The arrests continued following the denunciations made by the first group of defendants. In July 1460, six other people were executed. The accusations were now beginning to target even some prominent citizens, including wealthy burghers, an alderman, and a lesser nobleman named Colard de Beaufort. The economy of the city, which until then had been a bustling commercial centre, was rapidly deteriorating: merchants from other towns were reluctant to do business with their counterparts in Arras, whose property could be confiscated at any moment by the Inquisition, and travellers from Arras struggled to find accommodation outside the city, as potential hosts began to turn them away for fear of being drawn into the spiral of accusations. A significant portion of the population grew highly sceptical about the whole affair, suspecting it was merely a pretext for confiscating the property of the accused. Anonymous poems began to circulate in which the inquisitors were accused of greed and corruption. At this point, it became clear that they had gone too far. Some of the most prominent defendants appealed to the Parliament of Paris. As a result, in August 1460 Duke Philip the Good put a stop to the arrests. Even so, one final execution was carried out in October. But in January 1461, a Parisian officer arrived in Arras and summoned the vicars to appear before the royal law court.

=== Appeal and Rehabilitation ===
Most members of the inquisitorial commission took flight. Du Bois, who had inspired great resentment among the population, suffered a mental breakdown on his way to Paris, which many interpreted as divine justice, and was dead within the year. The Paris court of appeal ultimately ruled in favour of the defendants and ordered their full rehabilitation as well as the return of their confiscated property, although, for various reasons, this ruling was not fully enforced until 1491. At that time, a cross was erected at the site of the execution, a mass was instituted for the souls of those executed, and the publication of the judgements gave rise to great celebrations.

== Written legacy ==
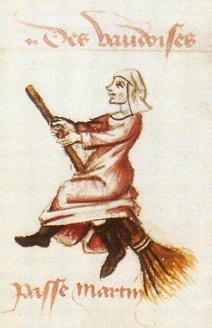
A witch riding a broomstick, from a manuscript of Martin le Franc’s Le Champion des Dames, c. 1451 (BnF, Ms Fr 12476, fol. 105v).

The Vauderie of Arras, which took place within a highly sophisticated urban society, inspired a body of written works of great significance. Although the trial records were burnt on the orders of the Parliament of Paris, a detailed account of the events has been preserved in the memoirs of the chronicler Jacques du Clercq. The trials also inspired two theological treatises which made an important contribution to the emerging debate on diabolical witchcraft. One of them is A History of the Case, State, and Condition of the Waldensian Heretics (1460, commonly known as the Recollectio after the first word of its Latin title). This work, probably written by Jacques du Bois, argues that witches really have the ability to fly and provides a detailed account, supposedly inspired in the Arras confessions, of the induction of a woman into the witches' cult. The other treatise is Johannes Tinctor’s Invectives Against the Sect of Waldensians (1460), which aims to answer a number of technical questions about witches and their practices and to exhort the authorities to eradicate the sect. Tinctor's work proved very successful, leading to it being widely distributed, translated from Latin into Middle French, and set down in lavishly illuminated manuscripts which circulated in the Burgundian, French, and English courts.
