= Jacques du Clercq =

Jacques du Clercq (1420-1501) was a Burgundian chronicler, advisor to Duke Philip the Good, and magistrate of the city of Arras; author of the Mémoires.

== Biography ==
Biographical information about him is quite scarce and is derived primarily from his own writings. Hailing from the county of Artois, he did not belong to the titled nobility, although he styled himself an écuyer (esquire) and held the title of Seigneur de Beauvoir-en-Ternois.

The author’s great-grandfather, Pierre du Clercq, was a native of Bapaume, while his grandfather, Thomas du Clercq, resided in Douai. His father, Jacques du Clercq the Elder, made an advantageous marriage in 1409 to the daughter of Jean de Camelin, a councillor in Flanders; he later moved to Lille, where he became a lawyer and an advisor to Philip the Good, Duke of Burgundy, for the châtellenies (administrative districts) of Lille, Douai, and Orchies.

Jacques du Clercq the Younger, who—like his father—entered the service of the Duke, did not have a particularly illustrious career. In 1444, he relocated to Arras (in the modern-day Hauts-de-France region), where he married Jeanne de Lacherie in 1446.

It is not known for certain when he left the Duke’s service. Even the date of his death remains undetermined; suggested dates include October 1467, 1469, and September 21, 1501.

As late as the 18th century, a tombstone could still be seen in the Church of St. Nicholas in Arras, bearing an inscription that has been preserved in a manuscript collection of epitaphs held by the Royal Library (now the National Library of France):

"Here lies Jacques du Clercq, esquire, Seigneur de Beauvoir-en-Ternois, who passed away on September 21, 1501, and Madame Jeanne de Lacherie, his wife, who died on September 26, 1503".

His brother, Jean, served as the abbot of the Benedictine Abbey of St. Vaast in Arras.
