= Zaubererjackl witch trials =

17th-century witch trials in Austria

The Zaubererjackl trials ('Magician Jackls process') or Salzburg witch trials, which took place in the city of Salzburg in 1675–1690, was one of the largest and most famous witch trials in Austria, which had been relatively free from witch hunts due in large part to the tolerance of Emperor Maximilian II, but this attitude disappeared with the accession of the Jesuit Rudolf II who went on to codify the imperial practice of burning over the next forty years. It led to the execution of 139 people. It was an unusual witch trial, as the majority of its victims were males.

== Background ==
In 1675, Barbara Kollerin was put on trial for theft and sorcery in Salzburg together with one Paul Kalthenpacher. During torture, she confessed that her son, Paul Jacob Koller, had a pact with Satan. Her partner, Kalthenpacher, confirmed this and described Jacob as a man of 20, the son of an executioner's assistant. Barbara was to have taught him the "profession" of begging, theft and fraud. Barbara Kollerin was executed at the stake in August 1675. The authorities issued a warrant for the arrest of her son who was never captured. He became known as "Wizard Jackl" or "Magician Jackl" or "Jäckel". Kalthenpacher's fate is unknown.

== The Jackl trial ==
In 1677, the government was said to have received word that Jackl had died. They had arrested for a beggar boy Dionysos Feldner (sometimes called "Feldner Bettlebub Dionysos"), a handicapped 12-year-old who was called "Dirty Animal", and who was said to have had contact with Jackl three weeks earlier. The boy confessed that Jackl was the leader of gangs of poor beggar-children and teenagers from the slum, whom he taught black magic. This led to mass arrests of homeless children and teenagers. The hysteria spread to the entire archbishopric.

During the interrogations of the captive beggar-teenagers, the confessions of the prisoners lead to more and more myths about Jackl. He was claimed to be able to make himself invisible and enchant mice and rats, which ruined the harvests of the farmers. He was portrayed as a murderer and the rumors eventually made him so cruel that the officials preferred to avoid capturing him. He was the most famous wizard in the city's history, but he was never captured himself. The witch trial, on the other hand developed into a great hunt of beggars, homeless and poor children and teenagers. Gangs were especially targeted. Many were accused of having caused some of the bad weather from the previous years. "Transcripts from the trials, particularly the interrogations from the Grand Aulic Court in Salzberg, proved in large part that the confessions of the children were 'guided' by the suggestions of the police and their youthful fantasies merged with myth to form a 'virtual construct' of the Jäckel—a figure who was still devoid of any shape or definition."

== Executions ==
139 people were executed as the followers of Jackl in this trial; 39 were children (between 10 and 14 years old), 53 were teenagers and young adults (between 15 and 21), 21 of unknown age; 113 were of male gender; everyone except two were beggars. The youngest was Hannerl, 10 years old, and the oldest was Margarethe Reinberg, 80 years old. 109 were executed during 1681. They were tortured and burned; some of them alive, others after having been hanged or decapitated - some of them after having had their hands cut off and chests branded with burning irons. Many executions took place at Moosham Castle.

== In popular media ==
Danish Heavy Metal band Mercyful Fate released a single, "The Jackal of Salzburg", in 2022. The lyrics tell the story of the witch trials.
