= Unternberg =

- Municipality
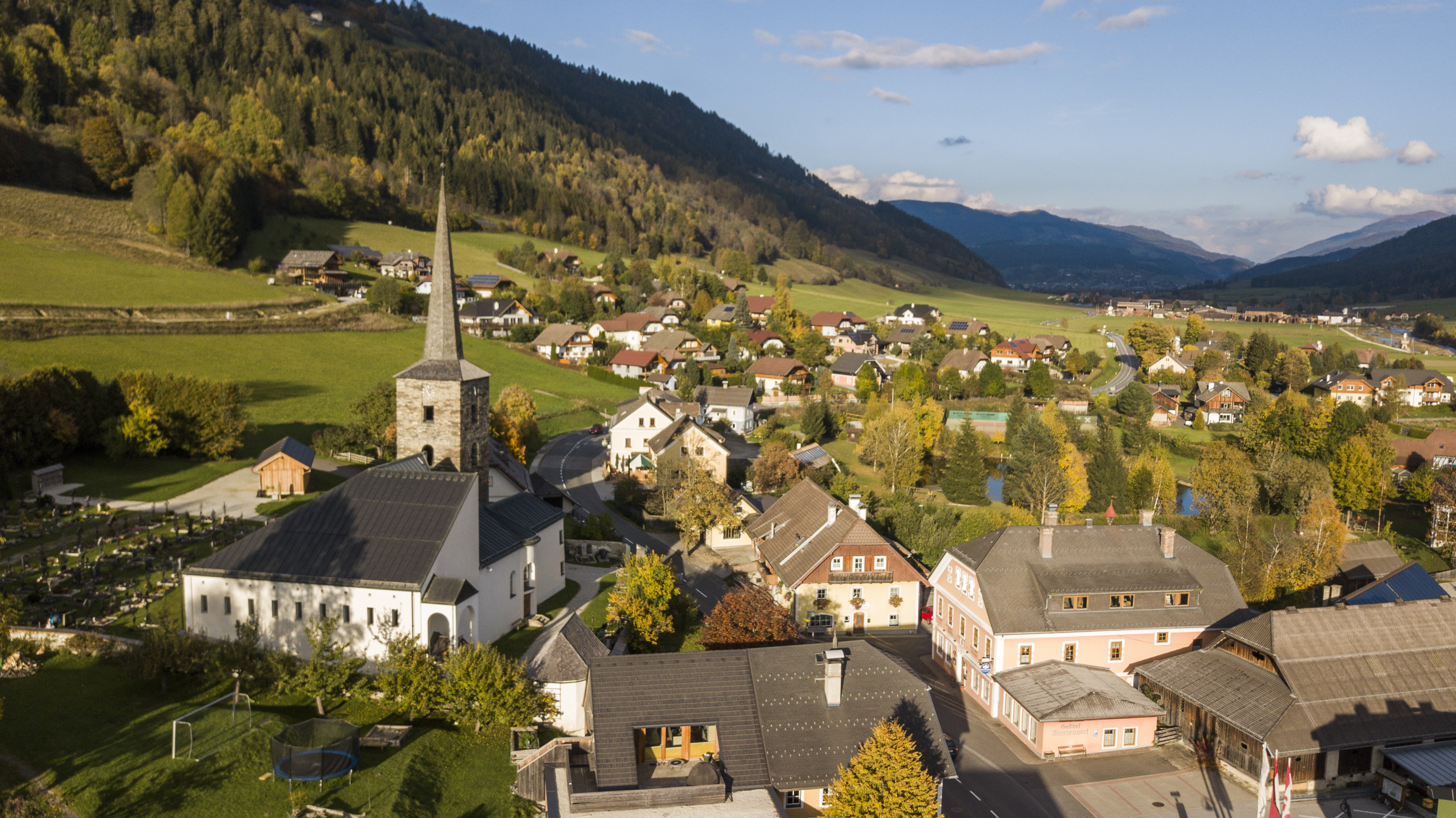
- Moosham Castle

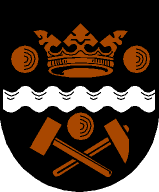
- Coat of arms

- Location within Austria
- Coordinates: 47°06′44″N 13°44′24″E
- Country: Austria
- State: Salzburg
- District: Tamsweg

Government
  - Mayor: Peter Sagmeister (ÖVP)

Area
  - Total: 18.95 km^{2} (7.32 sq mi)
- Elevation: 1,028 m (3,373 ft)

Population (2018-01-01)
  - Total: 1,035
  - Density: 54.62/km^{2} (141.5/sq mi)
- Time zone: UTC+1 (CET)
  - Summer (DST): UTC+2 (CEST)
- Postal code: 5585
- Area code: 06474
- Vehicle registration: TA
- Website: www.unternberg.at

Unternberg is a municipality in the district of Tamsweg in the state of Salzburg in Austria.

== See also ==
- Salzburgerland
- Salzburg
