= Perrissona Gappit case =

15th century witch trial

Perrissona Gappit (also Perrussone) was tried for witchcraft in 1465 in Switzerland.

== Background ==
Witch trials were still uncommon in the 15th century when the concept of diabolical witchcraft began to emerge. The study of four chronicles concerning events in Valais, the Bernese Alps and the nearby region of Dauphiné has supported the scholarly proposal that some ideas concerning witchcraft were taking hold in the region around the 1430s recasting witchcraft as an alliance with the devil that would undermine and threaten the Christian foundation of society.

According to the work of historian and professor, Georg Modestin, Perrissona Gappit was a widow who was remarried and living with her in-laws at the time of the accusation and trial. She was living in Châtel-Saint-Denis in the "foothills of the Alps," in an area that had only one prior case related to witchcraft. The pre-trial investigation began on January 11,1465 and was carried out by Claude Burritaz, the notary of Lausanne, acting on behalf of the bishop; three witnesses and Perrissona herself were interviewed.

The first witness interviewed was her son in-law, Jordan dou Molard and then her husband, Guillaume dou Molard. They both considered her a heretic, which at this time was an "equivalent for witch," due to her character. Her accusers considered her to be quick to anger and focused on revenge; her alleged vindictive character was seen through her ability to "wreak evil in the form of strange illnesses." Her son-in-law claimed to have been paralyzed, while her husband claimed to have lost his speech. Modestin attributes the accusations from her family to the crowded living conditions of the family home, as well as Perissona's role as a "newcomer" in town, even after 18 years of marriage to Guillaume.

The third witness interviewed, Mermette Amoudri, was a neighbor and accused Perissona of attempting to abduct her newborn son; this alleged attempt was unsuccessful, and the child was said to have died afterwards.

== Trial and execution ==
The case, tried in the area of modern-day Fribourg, Switzerland, is noted for the thoroughness of the surviving record. The records include pre-trial depositions, include Perissona's own deposition, and several witnesses. The trial lasted seven sessions between 23 January and 4 February 1465. The trial was led by Dominican Damien Berruerii, a vice-inquisitor known more for his preaching than as an "ecclesiastical judge."

Trials for witchcraft in what Kieckhefer calls the "popular tradition" were limited to accusations of sorcery but consorting with the Devil was not a factor in the standard accusations of cursing animals and causing bad weather. Perrissona was accused by two witnesses of trying to kidnap an infant, causing the death of the infant by malicious magic and preparing food that made others ill. She denied the allegations until the inquisitorial vicar became involved. The inquisitor was specifically interested in the diabolical element of the crimes. According to Kieckhefer, the role of the Devil in these types of allegations began with "the learned tradition of the judges".

Under the new questioning, Perrissona eventually confessed to meeting with the Devil and eating the flesh of an infant at a diabolical assembly, even while the testifying witness has made no such allegation. Some of the confessions were extracted under torture.

After the trial Perrissona was sentenced to death and burned in public.

== Studies of the case ==
The case was first studied in 1909. It has been the subject of several scholarly writings that have considered different aspects of the trial. One study from 1976 noted the charges changed mid-trial from sorcery to diabolical witchcraft. Another study published in 1989 explored details about the backgrounds of the accused. Scholars have also examined the unstable political situation in Châtel in the 1460s in connection with the case.
