= Szeged witch trials =

1728–1729 witch trials in Hungary

The Szeged witch trials, which took place in the city of Szeged in Hungary in 1728–1729, was perhaps the largest witch-hunt in Hungary. It led to the death of 14 people by burning, although witch trials had been banned by the decree of King Coloman in 1100.

== The trials ==
The witch trial was instigated by the authorities, which decided on this measure to remove the problem of the public complaints about the drought and its consequences of famine and epidemics by laying the responsibility on people among them, which had fraternized with the Devil. If they were killed, the problems would be solved; God did not like the people, and thus they were being punished. A fear arose in the Habsburg empire that witches had begun to be organized like military units. A particular fear in Hungary was that witches were also vampires.

Among the people accused was the former judge and richest citizen of the town, 82-year-old Dániel Rózsa, said to be the leader of the witches, and Anna Nagy Kökényné, a midwife who had accused him of witchcraft.

On 23 July 1728, 12 people, six men and six women, were burned at the stake for witchcraft on a peninsula of the Tisza, called Boszorkánysziget (Island of Witches). 13 people were burned and 28 accused in total.

Witch trials had occurred in Hungary since the 16th century, but did not reach any high level until the 1710s and 1720s, when the real panic arrived. In 1756, Queen Maria Theresa ordered that all cases of witchcraft must be confirmed by the high court, which more or less ended the witch trials; the last person in Hungary was executed for witchcraft in 1777.
