= Nicholas Jacquier =

French inquisitor (died 1472)

Nicholas Jacquier (also Nicolaus Jaquerius, Nicolas Jacquier, Nicholas Jaquier) (died 1472 in Lille) was a French Dominican and Inquisitor. He became known as demonologist and proponent of witch-hunting.

== Life ==
Jacquier took part in the Council of Basel from 1432 onwards, where he appears in May 1440 as a member of the deputatio fidei. In 1459, he witnessed the persecution of alleged witches in Arras, during the series of trials known as the Vauderie d'Arras. He resided in the Dominican convent of Lille after 1464. He traveled to Tournai in 1465 and was active as an inquisitor against the heretics in Bohemia from 1466 to 1468. His presence as an inquisitor in Lille is documented in 1468.

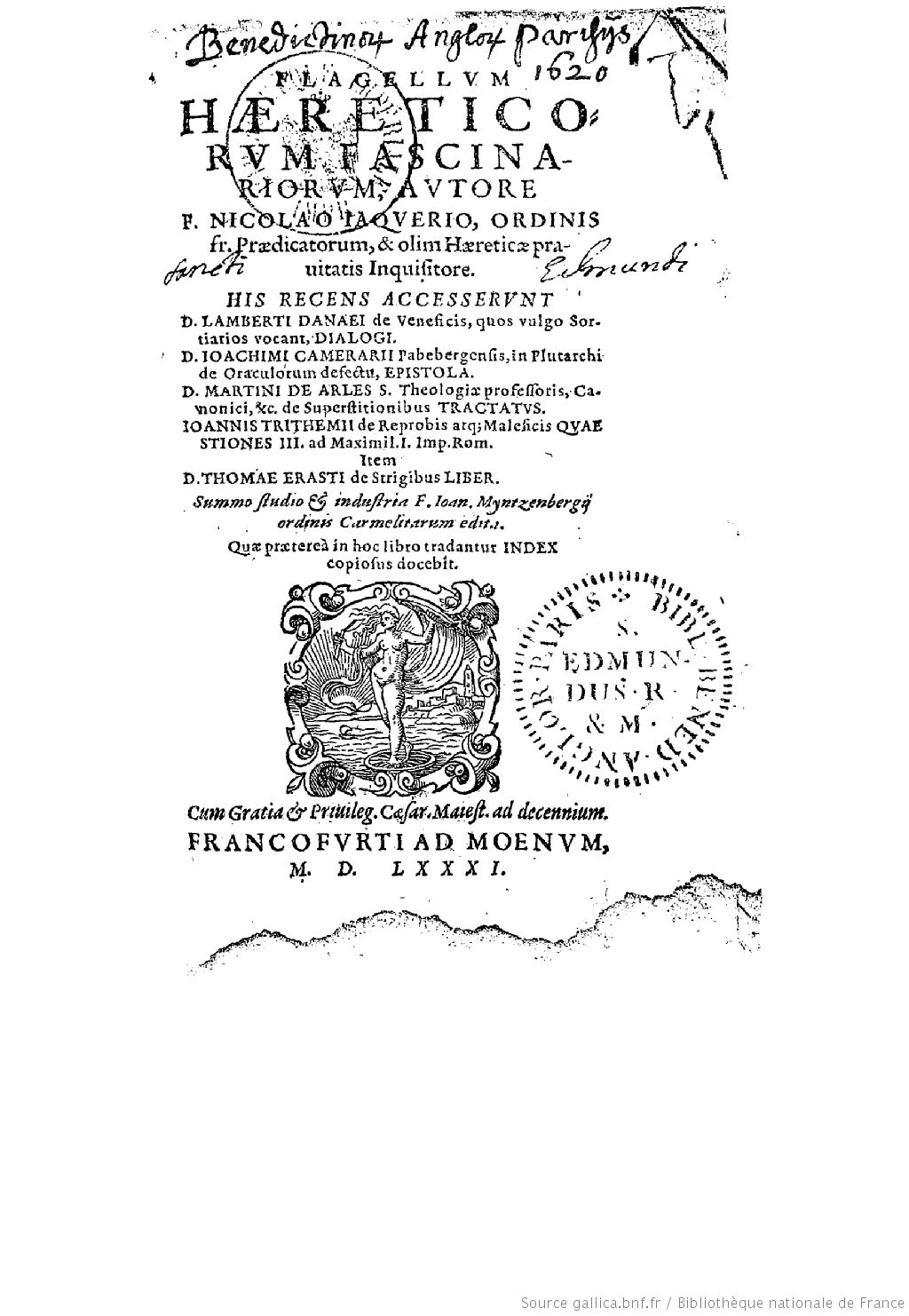
Title page of Flagellum haereticorum fascinariorum from the Bibliothèque nationale de France

== Flagellum haereticorum fascinariorum ==
Jacquier argued in his book A Scourge for Heretical Witches (Flagellum haereticorum fascinariorum) that witchcraft is a heresy, and, as such, the persecution of witches is justified. "Jacquier conceives of witchcraft principally in terms of a heretical cult: to him it is the 'abominable sect and heresy of wizards,' in which demons, not witches play the leading role." He also denied that the Canon Episcopi, which had been invoked to undermine witches' claims to supernatural feats including night flights, was relevant in the contemporary debate regarding the supposed powers of witches. The text is dated to 1458 but was first printed in 1581 together with a reprint of Thomas Erastus's Repetitio disputatio de lamiis seu strigibus.

== Works ==
- Flagellum haereticorum fascinariorum (1458; editio princeps Frankfurt am Main, 1581)
