= Johan Pistorius =

Danish grenadier executed for witchcraft

Johan Pistorius (died 1722), was a Danish grenadier. He was judged guilty of making a Satanic pact, and was the last person executed for witchcraft in Denmark.

Johan Pistorius was a soldier in the Danish army with the rank of grenadier. He was arrested and accused of the crime of making a pact with the Devil. He was not put on trial by the Danish authorities, but by a military court. He was judged guilty and sentenced to be executed by a military court martial. He confessed to the crime. He claimed to have been inspired to the pact after reading a book about Doctor Faust.

The court faculty of Professors in Copenhagen recommended the king to confirm his sentence after they had interrogated him - which was unusual - and deemed that his regret was not sufficient, and that he should be executed as a public warning against the crime of Devil's Pact after having made a public confession of regret, which resulted in the public burning of the infamous pact at Nytorv square, followed by the execution of Pistorius the following day.

While Anne Palles is often called the last witch to be executed in Denmark, she was in fact only the last woman to be executed for witchcraft in Denmark, as Johan Pistorius was executed circa thirty years after her. There were death sentences for witchcraft in Denmark long after this. In 1733 a student, and in 1752 a farmer, were sentenced to life imprisonment with forced labor for Satanic pact, and as late as in 1803, two craftsmen received death sentences for the same crime, although none of the sentences were actually carried out. People were also lynched for witchcraft in Denmark long after the formal persecution stopped: the most known cases being that of Dorte Jensdatter, who was apprehended by the villagers who tied her up in her own home and burned it down after having accused her of causing death by magic, and the last lynching of witchcraft, in which Anna Klemens was lynched after having been pointed out for sorcery by a cunning woman in Brigsted at Horsens in 1800.
