= Barbara Królka =

Polish alleged witch

Barbara Królka (died 1664 or 1670), was a Polish woman accused of being a witch. Her case was among the more famed of Polish witch trials.

She was accused of having cast a spell upon Wacław Jeziorkowski and his family. Królka was also blamed for having caused by magic the plague which took place almost fifty years earlier in 1624. She was also credited with enchanting of King Zygmunt August and causing the deaths of queens Elżbieta Habsburżanka (1545) and Barbara Radziwiłłówna (1551). She was judged guilty as charged by the local mayor of Wizna and executed by burning.

== In culture ==
A reenactment of Królka's execution is held in Kiermusy annually on the second Sunday of September.

In 2016, an exhibition of torture instruments and devices was opened in Kiermusy. The exhibition was inspired by the story of Królka's life and death.

== See also ==
- Witch trials in Poland
- Doruchów witch trial
- Anna Szwedyczka
- Krystyna Ceynowa
- Zofia Marchewka
