= Zofia Marchewka =

Polish alleged witch

- Died: 1717; Brześć Kujawski, Brześć Kujawski Voivodeship, Polish–Lithuanian Commonwealth
- Cause of death: Burnt at the stake

Zofia Marchewka (died 1717, Brześć Kujawski, Poland) was a Polish woman accused of witchcraft. Her case was a late case of a witch trial, particularly as it resulted in an execution, and one of the last in Poland. It also illustrates the use of torture in witch trials and the process of confessions by torture used.

== Trial ==
Zofia Marchewka was a widow of ministerialis Maciej Marchewka. She was accused in 1717 (some sources mistakenly transpose the year as 1771) of being a witch and of damaging various people's health and wealth with her magic. Two men, Adam Kwiatkowski and Stanisław Dąbrowa, suspected her of casting a spell (in the form of a devil influencing food) on Kwiatkowski's wife, and of bewitching his son, a minor. The trial was held at a court in Brześć Kujawski, but there are no longer any records of the judging panel or details of the trial. The trial records probably did not survive as they were stored in Central Archives of Historical Records in Warsaw which were destroyed during the Second World War.

The only detail of the trial which remained was the verdict, which was published in the 19th century. According to the verdict, the court decided that the woman cast a spell, was ungodly (pol. wyrzekła sie Boga), married a devil, stole the holy sacrament from a church, and together with other witches attended sabbaths at Łysa Góra (Bald Mountain). She was tortured and sentenced to death by burning at the stake.

== In literature ==
Anna Koprowska-Głowacka alluded to the history of Zofia Marchawska in a short story written in 2010. The story, written on the basis of facts from similar trials, describes how the trial could have proceeded.

According to the short story, Marchewka was arrested in 1717 upon the request by Kwiatkowski. When she claimed to be innocent, she was tortured to force her to confess. After the first series of tortures, the accused "admitted" she was a witch and served a devil who tempted her to hurt people (including her husband and the wife of Kwiatkowski) and animals. She also admitted participating in sabbaths and worshiping the devil. When the tortures stopped, she recanted her testimony and again claimed to be innocent. When she was tortured a second time, she was forced to admit her guilt again. She was deemed to be a witch and sentenced to death at the stake.

== See also ==
- Witch trials
- Witch trials in Poland
- Doruchów witch trial
- Anna Szwedyczka
- Barbara Królka
- Katarzyna Paprocka
- Krystyna Ceynowa

== Bibliography ==
- Cybulski, Tomasz (2015). "Proces Zofii Marchewki w Brześciu Kujawskim". Studia Włocławskie. 17: 505–511.
- Koprowska-Głowacka, Anna (2010). "Historie czarownic: Wiek XVIII" [Stories of Witches in 18th century]. Czarownice z Pomorza i Kujaw [Witches of Pomerania and Kujawy] (in Polish). Gdynia: Wydawnictwo Region. ISBN 978-83-7591-168-8.
- "Prześladowanie czarów w dawnej Polsce" [Sorcery oppressions in old Poland]. Album uczącej się młodzieży polskiej poświęcone Józefowi Ignacemu Kraszewskiemu z powodu jubileuszu jego pięćdziesięcioletniej działalności literackiej [Album of school youngsters dedicated to Jóżef Ignacy Kraszewski for the reason of 50th anniversary of his literary activity]. Lwów. 1879. p. 502.
