= Ingeborg Hark =

Danish woman executed for witchcraft

Ingeborg Hark or Ingeborg Harchis (died 1610), was a Danish woman who was executed for witchcraft in Ribe. The court protocol of the city of Ribe in the 1572–1652 period is the most well preserved of all documents describing the witch trials in Denmark, and has been a focus of study for the Danish witch trials.

== Case ==
Ingeborg Hark was married to the merchant Hans Kristensen Vodder of Ribe.

She is known to have been accused of sorcery three times. During the witch trial against Maren Prækfaders in 1577, she was named as an accomplice by Maren Prækfaders herself. However, she called upon 24 dannemænd (character witnesses) to swear on her innocence. This was a legal method for an accused to be freed from charges in Denmark: it rarely worked for the poor outcast women who were normally accused of witchcraft, but was used with success by established citizens from the higher classes to escape charges. Ingeborg Hark, being a middle class merchant wife, was able to use this method with success, and was freed from all charges. A witch trial relied on an accused witch to name other witches to continue, just as Maren Prækfaders had named Hark. However, when Ingeborg Hark was freed, there were no more witches named, and the 1577 Ribe witch trials stopped.

In 1578, Hans Guldager accused Ingeborg Hark of having caused the illness of his wife by use of magic. She was however, never formally charged.

In 1610, Ingeborg Hark was accused of sorcery for the third time. She was charged with the crime of having bewitched several individuals. Subjected to torture, she confessed to all charges and named her daughter Bodil Hark as her accomplice. When she was taken to her execution, she took back both her confession of her own guilt as well as her accusation of her daughter, and explained that both of these were lied that she had made exclusively because of the torture she had been subjected to.

Ingeborg Hark was executed by burning in 1610. Her daughter was executed in 1614.
