= Kisamor =

Swedish natural doctor (1788–1842)

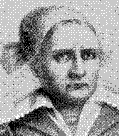
- Born: 1788; Örebro
- Died: 1842 (aged 53–54)
- Other names: Maria Jansson
- Occupation: doctor
- Spouse: Anders Olsson

Notes
- May have been the first woman to be granted a medical license in her country (1825)

Maria Jansson, known in history as Kisamor [ˈɕiːsaˌmuːr] (English: The Mother of Kisa) (30 July 1788 – 27 February 1842), was a Swedish natural doctor, one of the most notable and well-known of 19th-century physicians in Sweden. She is also a prominent example of a cunning woman in her country. The nickname Kisamor stems from the place where she worked.

== Biography ==
Born in Kvarntorp, Örebro, to a father known as Läke-Jan, a healer in natural medicine. Her mother died of typhus when Maria Jansson was six years old. Her father Läke-Jan was not keen on his daughter following in his footsteps to become a healer, due to the fact that she was female.

Despite her father, Maria Jansson learn to heal in secret and became increasingly called upon to heal people in need. At the age of 19, her father married her off to a farmer, Anders Olsson, in 1807. It was an unhappy marriage from the onset, but Maria Jansson would travel a lot to heal those who were ill, and earned a reputation as a skilled female healer. She gave birth to two daughters, Brita Stina in 1809 and Stina Kajsa in 1811, but both died before turning a year old. She divorced her husband in 1819.

By that time, she functioned as a doctor in natural medicine, and made a living visiting and nursing people. She was widely reputed, and called upon from far away. In 1814, she was given a home in Östergötland, Katrinebergs gård, as a gift by some rich female patients in recognition of successful treatment. She made house calls and visited the sick in their cottages. Sometimes, they came to her at an inn called Kisa, and thereby, she became known as Kisamor : "Mother from Kisa". She was described as temperamental and firm, and she is known to have enjoyed alcohol.

Kisamor became famous for her skill, and people came to her from all over the country for consultation and treatment. She was called to Stockholm in 1824, 1825, 1826, 1840 and 1841. On one occasion, she was asked to the royal court to attend one of the female members of the royal family. Tradition says that she was to have been granted a medical license by Sundhetskollegium in 1825 after having successfully treated the king and the Crown prince. This has been disputed, however, and the license is not completely confirmed. If it was a reality, she was quite unique, as the profession of a physician was formally barred to her gender in Sweden before 1870.

== See also ==
- Lovisa Aarberg
- Ingeborg i Mjarhult

== Sources ==
- Österberg, Carin et al., Svenska kvinnor: föregångare, nyskapare (Swedish women:Predecessors, pioneers). Lund: Signum 1990. (ISBN 91-87896-03-6)
- http://art-bin.com/art/akisamo.html
- Karl Henrik Tallmo: Kisamor: Läkarinna där vetenskapen knappt mer hoppas (Kisamor:Doctoress where science dare no longer hope9 (1972)
- Pia Höjeberg: Kisamor (1990)
- https://web.archive.org/web/20091003150847/http://www.edu.linkoping.se/lokalhistoria/oden/2002/maria_jaenson_kisamor.htm
