= Anna Szwedyczka =

Polish alleged witch

- Died: March 12, 1678; Lublin, Lublin Voivodeship, Polish–Lithuanian Commonwealth
- Cause of death: Burnt at the stake
- Era: Baroque
- Known for: Witch trial
- Criminal charges: Witchcraft
- Criminal penalty: Death

Anna Szwedyczka (died 12 March 1678 in Lublin) was an alleged Polish witch and a central figure in a high-profile Polish witch trial. She was executed for witchcraft by burning in Lublin.

She is the subject of the play Klątwy (The Curse) by Marcin Liber.

== See also ==
- Witch trials in Poland
- Doruchów witch trial
- Barbara Królka
- Krystyna Ceynowa
- Zofia Marchewka
