= Anne Palles =

Danish woman accused of witchcraft

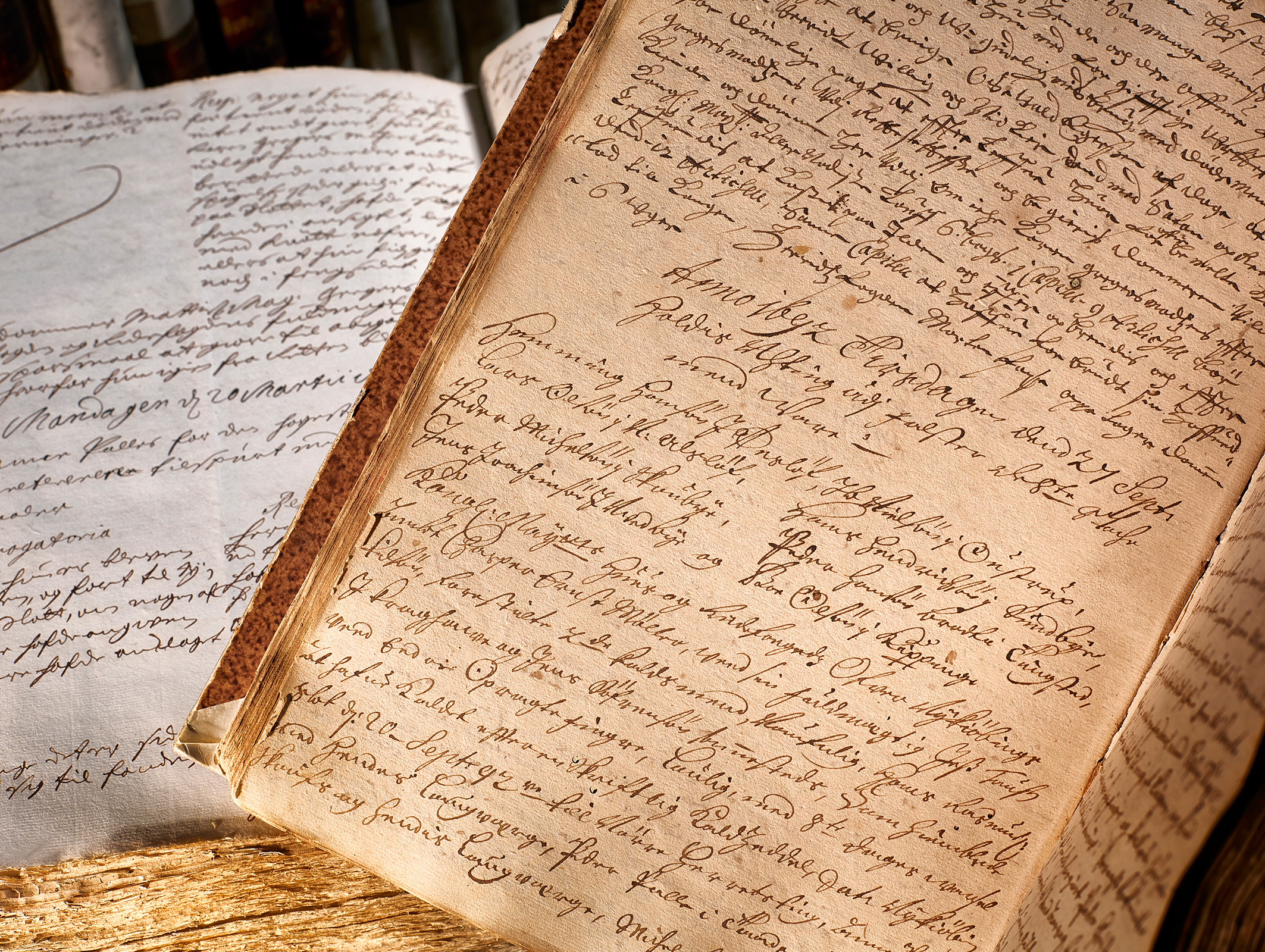
Records from the trial against Anne Palles, the last person in Denmark to be executed for witchcraft in 1692.

Anne Palles (1619 – 4 April 1693) was an alleged Danish witch. She was the last woman to be legally executed for sorcery in Denmark.

== Background ==
In 1692, the cunning woman Karen Gregers Madsens from Lommelev was accused of poisoning. She was hired by Ingeborg Olufsdatter in Nykøbing Falster to drug and murder her abusive and violent husband, Oswald Egger. Karen suggested that Egger was to be fed a bone from a corpse at the cemetery, so as the dead was to come after and kill him. The lover of Ingeborg, Ole Boesen, acquired the bone, but it did not work, and Egger was instead murdered with poison. After having been interrogated by six priests, she confessed to practising magic and pointed out Anne Kruse, Abigael Nielsdatter and Anne Palles in Tåderup as witches, as well as 96 clients.

== Accusations ==
Anne Palles was put on trial in 1692 accused of having enchanted a bailiff, Morten Faxe, by use of magic. The bailiff had taken over a property in Øverup previously owned by Palles and her husband Peder. Before she had left the farm, she was to have "peed bad luck" into it. This had caused the Faxes to feel uncomfortable in the house. Karen claimed to have seen her do this. The property had been a very good one; Anne had inherited it from her first husband, Niels, and it was thought that her second husband had married her because of the property—after they lost it, the marriage had become unhappy.

She was also accused of having murdered a woman by use of magic after her husband had fallen in love with her. In 1691, her husband had danced and flirted with Maren Jacobsdatter and Anne had promised Maren an accident, so that she would no longer be able to dance with other people's spouses and be admired such. Shortly thereafter, Maren had become sick, and eventually, she had died.

Thirdly, she was accused of having spoiled the harvest for a man, Hans Sværke, who was guilty of having forced her son to join the army.

== Interrogation ==
Anne Palles was imprisoned on Nykøbing Slot 31 August 1692. A group of priests began to interrogate her even before the trial had officially begun. When the trial opened 27 September 1692 she confessed the following; yes, she was a witch. She had met Satan in the shape of a black cat by the name Puus, who called her Annis, and she had given her body and soul to him. She was unsure whether this had happened six years ago, or fifty years ago, when she had been married to her first husband for four years. Her familiar helped her on the farm in the shape of a horse or a sheep and Stan did his part and was fed with oatmeal. She had also been at the Witches' Sabbath on Hesnæs with the other accused women; Hans Stang from Hasselø played the drum while Abigael Nielsdatter, by Stan called ”Biegell” danced in the middle; Abigael was also able to travel on a staff to Trondhjem in Norway.

== Sentence ==
On 2 November 1692, the court, led by judge Morten Faxe, judged her guilty and sentenced her to death. When the matter was to be confirmed by the higher court, Palles withdrew her confession; she said she had only confessed because the priests had tortured her in prison. She had been afraid to withdraw her confession before, because the priest had threatened that if she did so she would have her tongue ripped out and be burned alive. A majority of the high court in Copenhagen, however, voted for an execution. Of the other women accused, Anne Kruse was given the same sentence, but she died in prison before the execution. Abigael Nielsdatter was freed from execution but exiled for her "bad name", and Karen from Lommelev was flogged and banished.

== Execution ==
Normally, the method of execution for people sentenced for sorcery in Denmark was to be burned alive, but Palles was spared from the normal punishment by a special permission from the king, who ordered that she was to be decapitated before she was burned. On 4 April 1693, Karen was flogged, the corpse of Anne Kruse was burnt and Anne Palles was decapitated and her body thrown on the stake. On the place of execution, a placet was to be put on a pike with a description of the crime.

== Aftermath ==
Anne Palles was the last woman to be legally executed for sorcery in Denmark, but her case was not the last Danish witch trial. The last large witch trial in Denmark was the Thisted witch trial of 1698, in which several women were sentenced to death accused of having caused fits by sorcery. After the fits were proved to be false, however, the condemned were freed. After that, the Danish authorities were reluctant to accept any more charges of witchcraft. When the local court of Schelenburg condemned two women to be burned at the stake for witchcraft in 1708, the sentence was revoked by the high court.

Anne Palles has been called the last "witch" to be executed in Denmark. She was also likely the last woman to be executed for sorcery in Denmark: however, the last person to be legally executed for sorcery in Denmark was in fact a man, the grenadier Johan Pistorius. There were death sentences for witchcraft in Denmark long after this. In 1733 a student, and in 1752 a farmer, were sentenced to life imprisonment with forced labor for Satanic pact, and as late as in 1803, two craftsmen received death sentences for the same crime, although none of the sentences where actually carried out. People were also lynched for witchcraft in Denmark long after the formal persecution stopped: the best known cases being that of Dorte Jensdatter, who was apprehended by villagers who tied her up in her own home and burned it down after having accused her of causing death by magic, and the last lynching for witchcraft, in which Anna Klemens was lynched after having been pointed out for sorcery by a cunning woman in Brigsted at Horsens in 1800.
