= Brita Biörn =

Swedish cunning woman

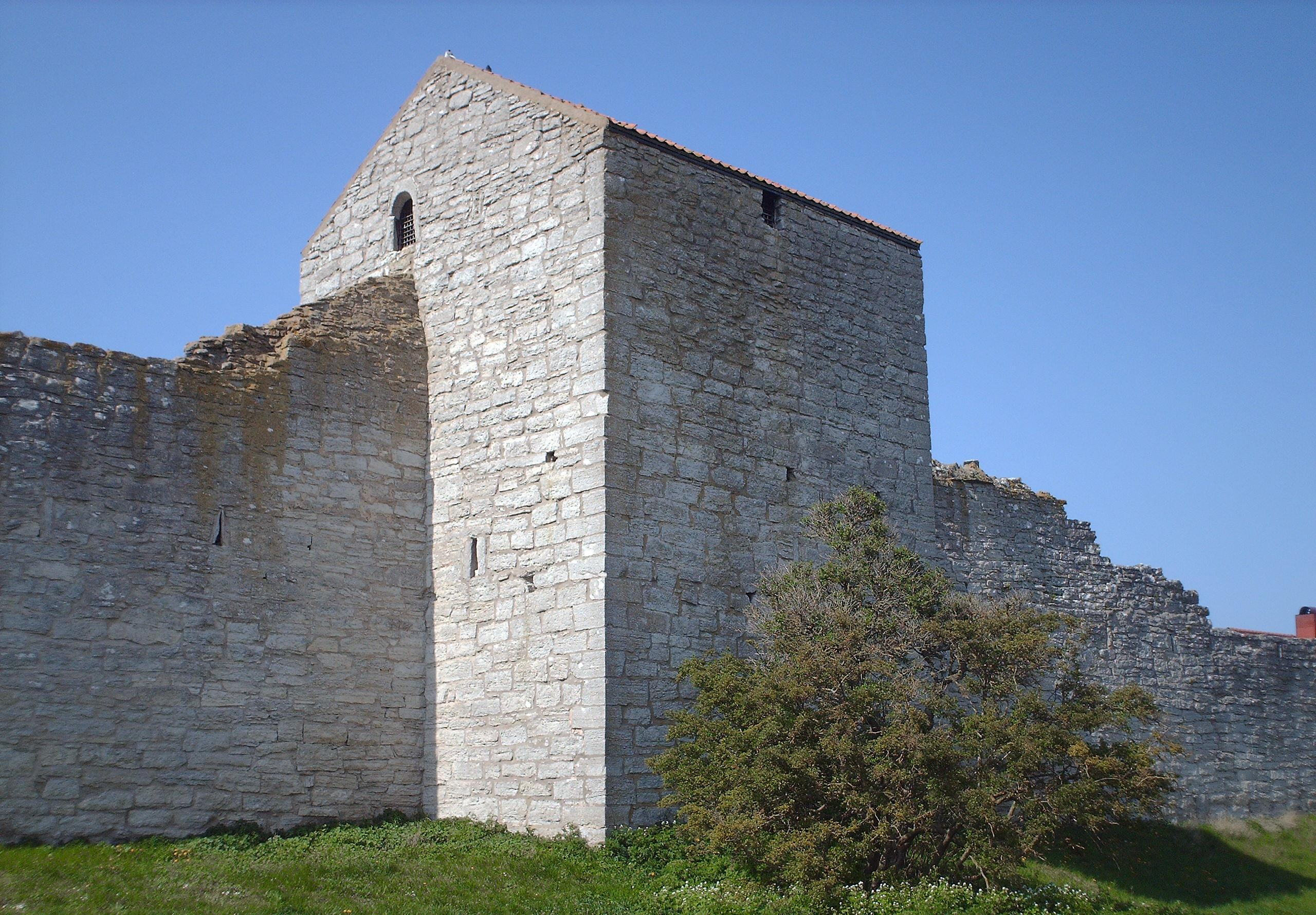
Kajsartornet

Brita Biörn, or Brita Biörns (1667–fl. 1745), was a Swedish cunning woman. She was active on Gotland and as one of the most reputed cunning women in contemporary Sweden, accused in two court cases.

== Life ==
Brita Biörn married boatswain Jöns Biörn in 1690 and Pehr Biörn in 1704, only to become a widow in 1718. She had a son in her first marriage. It is possible but not confirmed that her second spouse was her former brother-in-law. She was born in Gammelgarn, but lived in Gothem from 1685 onward.

She was active as a well-known cunning woman. Because of her activity as a cunning woman, she was accused by the parish vicar of Gothem, Niclas Lutteman, for superstition in 1722. Before court, she claimed that she had been taught her abilities by the cunning man Jacob i Halla, who had taken her to visit Di sma undar jordi, the little people in the underworld. She claimed to have made this visit only in her soul, while her body was left in the bed. The court considered her tale to be a Satanic illusion or a symptom of insanity, and sentenced her to eight days on water and bread and Uppenbar kyrkoplikt for having worked on a Sunday and for having used the name of the Trinity in her chants. She was banned from her work as a cunning woman and the vicar's assistants kept her cottage under watch.

The verdict, however, only served to make her more widely known as a cunning woman, and the vicar complained that many people travelled to her for her help and trusted her as if she was a deity. In 1737, the vicar's assistants caught her with a client, Beata Grupe, and they were both arrested and taken to the vicarage. She was put on trial for the second time in 1738. This time, she claimed to have been taught by her cousin Gertrud Zakrisdotter (1647–1718), and she read five of her medical chants in court. The court did not consider her guilty of witchcraft, but repeated their judgement from the last trial. On 21 October 1738 she was sentenced to 12 days on bread and water. She served her sentence at the Kajsartornet (Emperor's Tower) at the Visby city wall.

Brita Biörn is confirmed alive as late as 1745, but her exact year of death is unknown. In 1760, an old woman only mentioned as "Old Brita" is noted as dead in the parish register, and in 1765, "The widow of Biörn" was registered as dead, but it is not known if Brita Biörn was one of these two.

== Successors ==
She had a son, boatswain Olof Jönsson Lunda (1692–1773), who married Pernilla Larsesdotter (1715–1779). Her son's daughter Greta Enderberg (1746–1831) and great granddaughter Gertrud Ahlgren (1782–1874), succeeded her as famous cunning women on Gotland: they were both known as Hejnumskäringen during their time as cunning woman.

== See also ==
- Ingeborg i Mjärhult

== Sources ==
- Wall, Jan-Inge (1989). Hon var en gång tagen under jorden-: visionsdikt och sjukdomsbot i gotländska trolldomsprocesser = Once she was taken into the earth- : visionary tales and healing in Gotland witchcraft trials. Skrifter / utgivna genom Dialekt- och folkminnesarkivet i Uppsala. Ser. B, Folkminnen och folkliv, 0348-4483; 19. Uppsala: Dialekt- och folkminnesarkivet. Libris 7750067. ISBN 91-85540-44-7 (inb.)
- Christensson Jakob, red (2005). Signums svenska kulturhistoria. Stormaktstiden. Lund: Signum. Libris 10042872. ISBN 91-87896-75-3 (inb.)
- https://web.archive.org/web/20110818074923/http://www.gotland.net/sv/kvinnfolki/hejnumkallingen
- Botare. En bok om Etnomedicin i Norden. Gummessons Tryckeri AB, Falköping 1980. ISBN 91-36-01654-3
