= Maren Spliid =

Danish woman accused of witchcraft

Maren Spliid, Spliids or Splids, (Danish pronunciation: [ˈmɑˀn ˈspliːð]; c. 1600 – 9 November 1641), was an alleged Danish witch, probably the best known victim of the persecution of witches in Denmark.

== First trial ==
Maren Thomasdatter Splids originated from the village of Grimstrup in Esbjerg. She was the wife of a wealthy and successful tailor in the town of Ribe in Jutland and ran an inn in one of her husband's houses. She was an independent woman with a sharp tongue.

Didrik the tailor, an unsuccessful professional competitor to her husband, accused her of sorcery in 1637. He claimed that one night he had been awoken by three witches; two were unknown by him, but the third was Maren. They had held him down, and Maren blew into his mouth. The day after he was sick, and vomited up an object he thought was moving. The object was brought forward and observed by priests and the bishop, who declared it to be unnatural. But her husband stood by her side and managed to have her acquitted of the charges.

== Second trial ==
Didrik then gathered witnesses to support his cause and went straight to King Christian IV of Denmark, in 1639. The king declared that the case should be opened again, and that Maren should bring 15 character witnesses to swear her free from the charges. She did not manage to get them, and was therefore judged guilty of the charges in 1640, but freed by the higher court. The matter was now brought before the highest court, where the king was a judge. The king had Maren brought to Copenhagen and tortured her, despite the fact that the law forbade torture of prisoners before they were judged. The torture made her admit guilt and accuse a number of other people as witches. The judgement was; "Because Maren Spliid personally and here before the court as well as in earlier confessions, said that she had used sorcery, and thereby misused the holy sacrament of communion, we found her as a sorceress, and on her life suffer fire and stake". In Denmark, witches were often burned alive at the stake.

On November 9th 1641 she was burned at the stake on the Gallows Hill near Ribe. So many people had come to see it that the priest could hardly get to her. She was given a half bottle of alcohol to steady herself with and a bag of gunpowder on her back to make the death quicker. Then she was tied to a ladder, and the ladder was thrown into the fire.

== Aftermath ==
In 1652, eleven years after this execution, Anna Bruds was burned in Ribe as a witch. After this the witch hunt in Denmark was less intense, though the last convicted witch in Denmark, Anne Palles, was executed in 1693. Together with Norway, Denmark burned more witches than the other countries in Scandinavia. Many people were burned between 1540 and 1693, especially in Jutland and Northern Norway.

== Related reading ==
- Alm, Ellen Janette (2000) Statens rolle i trolldomsprosessene i Danmark og Norge på 1500- og 1600-tallet (Thesis, University of Tromso)
- Grønlund, David (1973) Historisk Efterretning om de i Ribe By for hekseri forfulgte og brændte Mennesker (Historisk Samfund for Ribe)
- Levack, Brian P. (2015) The Witch-Hunt in Early Modern Europe (Routledge) ISBN 978-1138808102
- Pavlac, Brian A. (2010) Witch Hunts in the Western World (University of Nebraska Press Bison Books) ISBN 978-0803232907
- Willumsen, Liv Helene (2008) Seventeenth-Century Witchcraft Trials in Scotland and Northern Norway (Thesis, University of Edinburgh)
