= Thisted witch trial =

1696–1698 witch trial in Denmark

The Thisted witch trial, also known as Besættelsen i Thisted ("The Thisted Possessions"), took place in Thisted in Denmark in 1696–1698. It has been referred to as the last witch trial in Denmark, and the end of the belief in witchcraft among the Danish authorities.

The witch trial started with the fits of cramp- and nervous attacks of 27-year-old Maren Christensdatter Spillemand. In January 1696, the local vicar, Ole Bjorn, diagnosed her fits as demonic possession. Soon, several other young women was afflicted by the same attacks. The fits were considered to be possessions caused by sorcery, and several local women were pointed out as responsible. The accused were arrested and put on trial, and a local court sentenced them guilty to be burned at the stake for witchcraft.

Some of the allegedly possessed women, however, admitted to Bishop Jens Bircherod that they had lied and not been afflicted by any fits. This led to the death sentences being revoked and the condemned freed from charges at the higher court. The falsely possessed women and the local vicar were tried before a commission's court in Ålborg and sentenced to death. Their death sentences were revoked by the high court and the monarch to imprisonment for the women, exile for the vicar and warnings to the other people involved in the witch trial.

After this, the Danish authorities were reluctant to accept any more charges of witchcraft. When the local court of Schelenburg condemned two women to be burned at the stake for witchcraft in 1708, the sentence was revoked by the high court. In 1722, a soldier was executed for witchcraft in Bremerholm, but he was judged and executed by a military court. In 1733 a student and in 1752 a farmer were sentenced to life imprisonment and forced labour after having been judged guilty of a pact with the Devil, and as late as 1803 two craftsmen were sentenced for the same crime.

Long after the legal courts stopped executing witches, however, the belief in witches led to private trials and lynching of alleged witches. In Øster Grønning in Salling in 1722, the villagers apprehended Dorte Jensdatter, whom they suspected of having caused death by magic, and executed her by burning after a private witch trial by tying her up and burning down her home with her in it. The last case is often said to have been that of Anna Klemens, who was pointed out as a witch in Brigsted at Horsens and beaten to death in 1800.
