= Witch trials in Poland =

The witch trials in Poland started later than in most of Europe, not beginning in earnest until the second half of the 17th century, but they also lasted longer than they did elsewhere. Despite being formally banned in 1776, the law was not evenly enforced for the next half century, even after the witch trials had ended or become a rarity in the rest of Europe. It is estimated that between 3,000 and 4,000 people were executed for sorcery in Poland.

== History ==
=== Early history ===
The first known witchcraft case in Poland is the one included in a heresy trial against Damian of Borków by Bishop Jakub von Płock (r. 1396–1425), but the exact date is unknown. In 1476, a woman, Dorota of Zakrzew, was sentenced to be burned for sorcery in Poznań, but the verdict was repealed, and the first confirmed execution for witchcraft in Poland took place when a woman whose name is unknown was executed in Waliszew in 1511.

=== Chronology ===
During the 16th century and the first half of the 17th century, 49 women and 19 men were condemned for witchcraft in Poland, mostly in the areas close to the Holy Roman Empire, particularly Poznań. The biggest witchcraft persecution, however, did not reach Poland until the second half of the 17th-century, and the most intense period of witch hunting in Poland took place in the period between 1670 and 1730. Witch hunts in Poland continued to a later period than it did in most other countries in Europe and continued during the entire 18th century, despite several law reforms to first limit and then ban them.

=== The Witch Trials ===
Witch trials in Poland could be conducted by three different authorities: by the secular city courts, by the clerical courts of the church, and by the private courts of the noble landlords' estates. Initially, witch trials were reserved for the clerical courts in accordance with a law from 1543, but in the following century, secular city courts handled them as well. On 17 July 1672, in accordance with a decree issued by Mikołaj Prażmowski (1663–1673) and archbishop Michał Radziejowski (1688–1705), local courts could manage witch trials only if they had been transferred to them by the church or a high court, and death sentences were banned unless confirmed by a high court. This law was issued after a local court in Kłodawa had burned a group of women following severe torture and a trial of dubious legality. However, this law was commonly ignored, and local courts continued to arrest, try and execute people for sorcery so that the law had to be repeated without effect several times until 1713. The Central High Court interrupted witch trials in local courts and stopped executions on several occasions, such as in Łęczyca in 1702 and Przemyśl in 1756.

The most intense period of the Polish witch hunt took place in a period in which Poland was pillaged and devastated by war, rebellions, famine and plague, and the public was in search of explanations for what was commonly viewed as an apocalyptic time for Poland. The typical Polish witch trial was conducted in a rural village or a small town against a woman accused by her neighbors for having used magic to cause suffering and harm to humans, animals, property and entire villages in a period of some catastrophe. The peasantry seldom included accusations about a pact with Satan or participation in a Witches' Sabbath, but accusations could be reinterpreted by the authorities of the Catholic church and local courts in order to make the case fit the descriptions in Christian demonology witchcraft handbooks. In Poland, the majority of those executed for sorcery were women: of 116 executed in Greater Poland and Kuyavia between 1624 and 1700, only five were men.

An example of a rural trial which culminated in a conviction for witchcraft was the one in Kasina Wielka witch trials in 1634.

=== The End of the Witch Trials ===
The Polish-Lithuanian Commonwealth was one of the first countries in which persecution for sorcery became illegal. In 1768, a law reform mandated that all witchcraft cases were to be transferred to the national high court. This reform was followed by the abolition of torture and the death penalty for witchcraft by the Sejm on 23 October 1776. However, these laws were commonly ignored by the local courts who continued to conduct witch trials, and the ban against witch trials could not be enforced in Poland.

A number of witch trials attracted attention in Poland during the second half of the 18th century when witch trials were formally banned. One such trail was the one against Franciszka Gołębiewska of Gostyń in 1773, who was tortured to death. In 1786 a combined witch- and murder trial took place in Ulanow, and in 1790, a married couple, Maciej and Katarzyna Beret, were put on trial in Schöffengericht von Nowy Wiśnicz, accused by the Krzywda family for having bewitched their cows. The likely last witch trial in independent Poland prior to the final partition was conducted in an unspecified village outside Poznań in 1793 against two women who were accused of having caused illness in livestock through the use of witchcraft.

The final Partition of Poland in 1795 did not immediately stop the witch trials despite the fact that witch trials were banned also by Russia, Prussia and Austria, as the Polish local courts had ignored the Polish ban against witch trials. There is little documentation preserved of the witch trials of the 1790s, but a witch trial is known to have taken place in Żaszków in Polish Ukraine (then Russian partition) as late as 1799. Barbara Zdunk, who was executed in a part of Poland then belonging to Prussia in 1811, has been described as the last person executed for sorcery in Poland (in the German partition) and also has sometimes been referred to as the last person officially executed for sorcery in Europe. This claim has been disputed, however, as witchcraft was not a criminal offense in Prussia at the time. The last person known to have died in Poland after accusations of sorcery was Krystyna Ceynowa, also in the German partition, who was lynched by locals in 1836. Those guilty of the lynching were judged and imprisoned by the German authorities.

== Number of victims and local characteristics ==
Although older research attributed to early research by Polish historian Bohdan Baranowski initially suggested that over 40,000 women might have been executed in witch trials in Poland, modern research, including newer works by Baranowski, note that those initial estimates have been widely exaggerated, and only between 3,000 and 4,000 people are estimated to have been executed for sorcery in Poland, 90% of them women. Approximately 50% of the accused were found guilty, a similar ratio to that in the rest of Europe.

The witch trials in Poland, although lasting longer than those in most of Europe, have been described as less intensive as the number of people executed for sorcery in Europe is estimated to be around 60,000. Unlike elsewhere in Europe, due to the privileges of Polish nobility, there are no recorded instances of a process and execution of a noble (outside of the legend of Walenty Potocki, which historians describe as a fictional story).

== See also ==
- Witch trials in the early modern period
- Doruchów witch trial
- Agnieszka Szymkowa
- Anna Szwedyczka
- Barbara Królka
- Katarzyna Paprocka
- Krystyna Ceynowa
- Zofia Marchewka
- List of people executed by Poland by burning
