= Krystyna Ceynowa =

Alleged Kashubian witch

- Born: c. 1785
- Died: 1836 (aged 50–51); Baltic Sea
- Cause of death: Bludgeoning
- Other names: Krystyna Cejnowa; Krystyna Halmann
- Era: Polish Enlightenment
- Known for: Last person in Poland to be lynched for witchcraft

Krystyna Ceynowa, also spelled as Cejnowa (b. c. 1785 – d. 1836), was an ethnic Kashubian victim of murder by lynching and an alleged witch.

Accused of sorcery, she was subjected to the ordeal of water and drowned in Ceynowa (today Chałupy). She was the last person in Poland and among the last people in Europe to be subjected to lynching on the grounds of sorcery and witchcraft.

== Life ==
Ceynowa was the widow of a fisherman, living at Ceynowa on the Hel Peninsula, in the Province of Prussia. She was regarded as suspicious by the community for various reasons, including the fact that she never went to church, and it was said that black crows were attracted to her chimney. This gave her a bad reputation in the eyes of the congregation and people suspected that she was a witch. However, the authorities at that time were not willing to conduct a witch trial, which at that time were illegal.

== Lynching ==
In 1836, she was taken captive by a lynch mob determined to test her to see if she was a witch. Her suppressors were called from Zoppot, and she was subjected to the ordeal of water during an illegal trial. The ordeal took place in the Baltic Sea — she was transported in a boat and thrown overboard. To the disbelief of many, she remained afloat for a long time, which was taken as an evidence of witchcraft, as none realized that her gown and skirt had acted as a buoy. When Ceynowa did not drown, the people found her to be a real witch and killed her with their paddles According to another account, she was stabbed to death.

== Historical case ==
Her case demonstrates that a belief in witchcraft continued among the public long after the legal authorities stopped accepting the charges of witchcraft, and that people occasionally took the law into their own hands when they suspected witchcraft.

== See also ==
- Witch trials in Poland
- Doruchów witch trial
- Anna Szwedyczka
- Anna Klemens
- Barbara Królka
- Barbara Zdunk
- Zofia Marchewka
- Dummy, the Witch of Sible Hedingham

== Sources ==
- Chałupy
- Last European witch
- Klaus Klöppel, Olaf Matthei: Polnische Ostseeküste (The Polish East coast)
- Nils Freytag: Hexenglauben im 19. Jahrhundert (Witch hunt in the 19th-century)
