= Køge Huskors =

Witch trial in Denmark

Coordinates: 55.45671°N 12.18267°E

Køge Huskors was the name for a witch trial in the city of Køge in Denmark, which took place in 1608–1615. It is one of the best known witch trials in Denmark. It led to the execution of between fifteen and twenty women by burning at the stake.

== Background ==
In 1608, rumors and accusations about sorcery began to spread in the city. In 1612, the wealthy merchant Hans Bartskær accused Johanne Thomes of having sent Satan into his house. To the court, he claimed that the Devil had been present in his house for four years.

In 1608, his wife Anne had heard the sound of a hen one night. They had not found anything, but numerous times, they had since then seen the Devil in various shapes in the house. A maid became sick, and no one wanted to sleep over any more. In 1611, Anne and Johanne had been involved in an argument. Now, the Devil tormented the back of Hans and his son became ill.

== Trials ==
During the trial, several witnesses confessed about accidents that had taken place after arguments with Johanne. She was described as verbal and courageous. She eventually confessed and pointed out four other women. One of these, Mette Banghors, confessed to have met the Devil in the shape of a rat. The maid of Johanne, Kirsten Lauridsdatter, said that Johanne had made her urinate in the baptismal bowl at church, and for this, Kirsten was burnt.

Annike Kristoffersdatter pointed out five women before she was burnt, and after this, seven more were burnt at the stake in 1613–1615. Another two killed themselves, one in prison, and one when she heard that she was going to be arrested.

== In culture ==
A book about the case was written already in 1674. In 1911, a memorial sign was put up about the case, and it was dramatized at the jubilee of the city in 1988.

== See also ==
- Anna Koldings
