= Copenhagen witch trials =

The Copenhagen witch trials of 1590 was the first major witch trial in Denmark. It resulted in the execution of seventeen people by burning. It was closely connected to the North Berwick witch trials in Scotland.

== Background ==
In the winter of 1589, Princess Anne of Denmark departed from Copenhagen to marry King James VI of Scotland. A great storm arose, which almost caused the ship to sink. The ship of the princess eventually harbored in Oslo in the Danish province of Norway, James VI joined her there, and the wedding took place in Norway instead of in Scotland, as had been planned. In the spring of 1590, after a few months at the Danish court, James VI and Anna returned to Scotland. Their voyage from Denmark was also beset by storms. The Danish court at that time was greatly perplexed by witchcraft and the black arts, and this must have impressed on the young King James.

At this point, the number of witch trials had been small in Denmark since the case of Doritte Nippers in 1571, when a law had been put in place, banning local courts from handling witch trials. About this time, however, the interest in witch trials had been revived because of the ongoing gigantic mass process in Germany, Trier witch trials, which was much talked about in Denmark and described in news pamphlets.

The Danish minister of finance, Christoffer Valkendorff, was accused by the Admiral Peder Munk of having equipped the royal ship so insufficiently that it had been unable to withstand the weather.

He defended himself by saying that the storm had been caused by witches in the house of Karen Vaevers ('Karen the Weaver'), who had sent little demons in empty barrels who had climbed up the keels of the ships and caused the storm.

== The process ==
The background to this was a confession made by Ane Koldings. In May 1590, Koldings was imprisoned in Copenhagen. She had already been found guilty of witchcraft in a case unrelated to the royal fleet, and was in prison awaiting her execution. Ane Koldings was considered a very dangerous witch, and referred to as Mother of the Devil. She was treated as somewhat of a celebrity in prison and displayed to visitors. She is known to have confessed to two priests and three female visitors while in prison.

Valkendorff, who was at this point blamed for the fiasco of the royal fleet, asked the Mayor of Copenhagen to question Koldings if she had been involved in bewitching the fleet. During torture, Koldings described how a group of women had gathered in the house of Karen, where they had caused the storm of the princess' ship by sending small devils up the keels of the ship.

Koldings was executed by burning in July 1590. On her confession, her accomplices were arrested the same month. Koldings had named five other women as accomplices, among them Malin, wife of the mayor of Helsingor, and Margrethe Jakob Skrivers. All women were arrested and charged. The spouse of Skrivers unsuccessfully tried to defend her, and was instead arrested and charged himself. Karen was arrested in July. She confessed to have been one of them who, together with Koldings, attended the gathering of witches which caused the storms, which hunted the royal ship, by use of witchcraft, and named other women as accomplices.

== Aftermath ==
When James and Anne reached Scotland, the North Berwick witch trials took place, in which witches were blamed for the royal voyage in the same manner as the witch trials in Copenhagen.
