= Katarzyna Paprocka =

Polish woman accused of witchcraft (died 1638)

- Born: Chełmno
- Died: 1638; Bydgoszcz
- Spouses: Daniel Nasalski; Adam Zawarciński; Adam Paprocki

Katarzyna Paprocka (born in Chełmno, died in 1638 in Bydgoszcz) was a 17th-century Polish woman accused of witchcraft by a debtor and business rival.

== Witch trial ==
Paprocka was a wife of fisherman called Daniel Nasalski and she was living in Rybacy in Chełmno. After becoming a widow, she married a tailor named Adam Zawarciński from the city of Bygdoszcz. The married couple gathered sizable wealth, but soon after, Zawarciński became ill and died. After that, Katarzyna received a marriage proposal, which she accepted, from a family friend, tailor Adam Paprocki. This was heatedly opposed by both the family of Paprocki and the family of his dead wife. Paprocka then sold a house she built together with Zawerciński to master tailor Tomasz Koles, who was to repay her in a few installments. When Paprocka tried to regain her money, Koles was did not pay. He then decided to accuse her of witchcraft. The death of Popracka would liberate him from the necessity of paying for the home he bought from her, and at the same time, he would get rid of a rich competitor.

Tomasz Koles, together with his accomplice, Joachim Byszewski, buried a pot with earth and cow bones at the threshold of the home. In the city's tavern, they talked with people about their plan to eliminate Paprocka. On 15 March 1638, Koles accused Paprocka of witchcraft – using magic, she was supposed to kill her second husband and force Paprocki to marry her. The evidence was an "accidentally" found pot containing bones. The judge at the trial was mayor Wojciech Łochowski, and the public prosecutor was Byszewski, whose wife, Regina Byszewska, testified against Paprocka, as did a neighbor of Paprocka, Jadwiga Pędziwiatrowa, alongside the Paprocki family and members of the tailors guild. Her legal defender presented witnesses who had heard Koles bragging in a tavern about his willingness to prepare "evidence". The defence also undermined the truthfulness of the witnesses presented by the prosecutor and presented a positive opinion about Paprocka, written by the city council of Chełmno.

Still, the court ordered her and torture. Her defender demanded an appeal from the court and Jerzy Ossoliński, starosta of Tęczyn, which suspended the court proceedings until 16 July. However, the city council of Chełmno soon changed their positive opinion about Paprocka after an accused witch from Chełmno said, under torture, that Paprocka had attended witches' sabbaths on Łysa Góra, a hill in the Świętokrzyskie Mountains. The appeal was lost, and Paprocka, who claimed to be innocent, was tortured for the first time on 31 July. She was tortured by burning her body, breaking bones from her joints and crushing her feet. Paprocka started to give evidence about her magical practices, but she claimed to not kill Adam Zawarciński. She claimed to have loved her husband and wanted to bring him back to health. The next series of tortures was planned to occur on 16 September, but was not conducted because of the poor health of the woman.

The legal documents of Paprocka were sent in 1640 to Warsaw (possibly to the Assessor's Court), but it was already too late. Paprocka apparently died in jail before the verdict. According to Małgorzata Pulaszek, the case of Paprocka is one of the two known cases in Poland in which there was an appeal during a witch trial where the city court ruling could be overcome with a verdict of a noble court. The protocol from the case describes in detail the actions of the court and legal arguments of both sides. The accused, with help of her legal representative and her husband, protested the truthfulness of witnesses (for example, Pędziwiatrowa was a well-known drunk) and demanded an appeal, claiming the libel, that the evidence of her guild were fabricated, and the court is not objective (the judge was also a witness of the prosecutor).

== Other witch trials in Bygdoszcz ==
Witch trials were also held in Bygdoszcz in 1630, 1657-58, 1668, and 1669-1670. In the first case 2 women were accused, a mother and a daughter - the verdict is unknown. It is known, however, that the mother was tortured, during which she admitted to having contacts with the devil. In the second trial, accused was a wife of a local baker (she died in jail), and in 1668 a wife of a Bygdoszcz surgeon called Jakub Milde. In the next year, accused of casting spells was a baker called Jan Biały. According to the court, he was to add to his bread pieces of human bones. The accusation was shown to be untrue - in 1670 the court sentenced the author of the libel, a baked Jan Frowerek, and he had to pay the fine.

== In literature ==
The story of Katarzyna Paprocka was shown in a literary form in a book Czarownice z Pomorza i Kujaw (pol. Witches from Pomerania and Kujawy) by Anna Koprowska-Głowacka. According to the short story, the first husband of the woman was Daniel Nosowski and the court documents, which were transported to Warsaw, caused a great strife. No proof of guilt of Katarzyna Paprocka was found in there.

== See also ==
- Witch trials in Poland
- Agnieszka Szymkowa
- Zofia Marchewka
- Witch trials

== Bibliography ==
- Koprowska-Głowacka, Anna (2010). Czarownice z Pomorza i Kujaw [Witches from Pomerania and Kujawy] (in Polish). Gdynia: Wydawnictwo Region. pp. 63–67. ISBN 978-83-7591-168-8.
- Anna Tarnowska (2010-05-07). "Czary-mary z finałem na stosie w Fordonie". bydgoszcz.gazeta.pl.
- Pilaszek, Małgorzata (2008). Procesy o czary w Polsce w wiekach XV–XVIII [Witchcraft trials in Poland in the 15th–18th centuries]. Kraków. pp. 245–249.
- Janiszewska-Mincer, Barbara (1966). "Bydgoski proces o czary w 1638 roku" [Bydgoszcz witchcraft trial in 1638]. Prace Komisji Historii III. Seria C, nr 3: 105–124.
