= Cunning folk =

Practitioner of folk magic in Europe

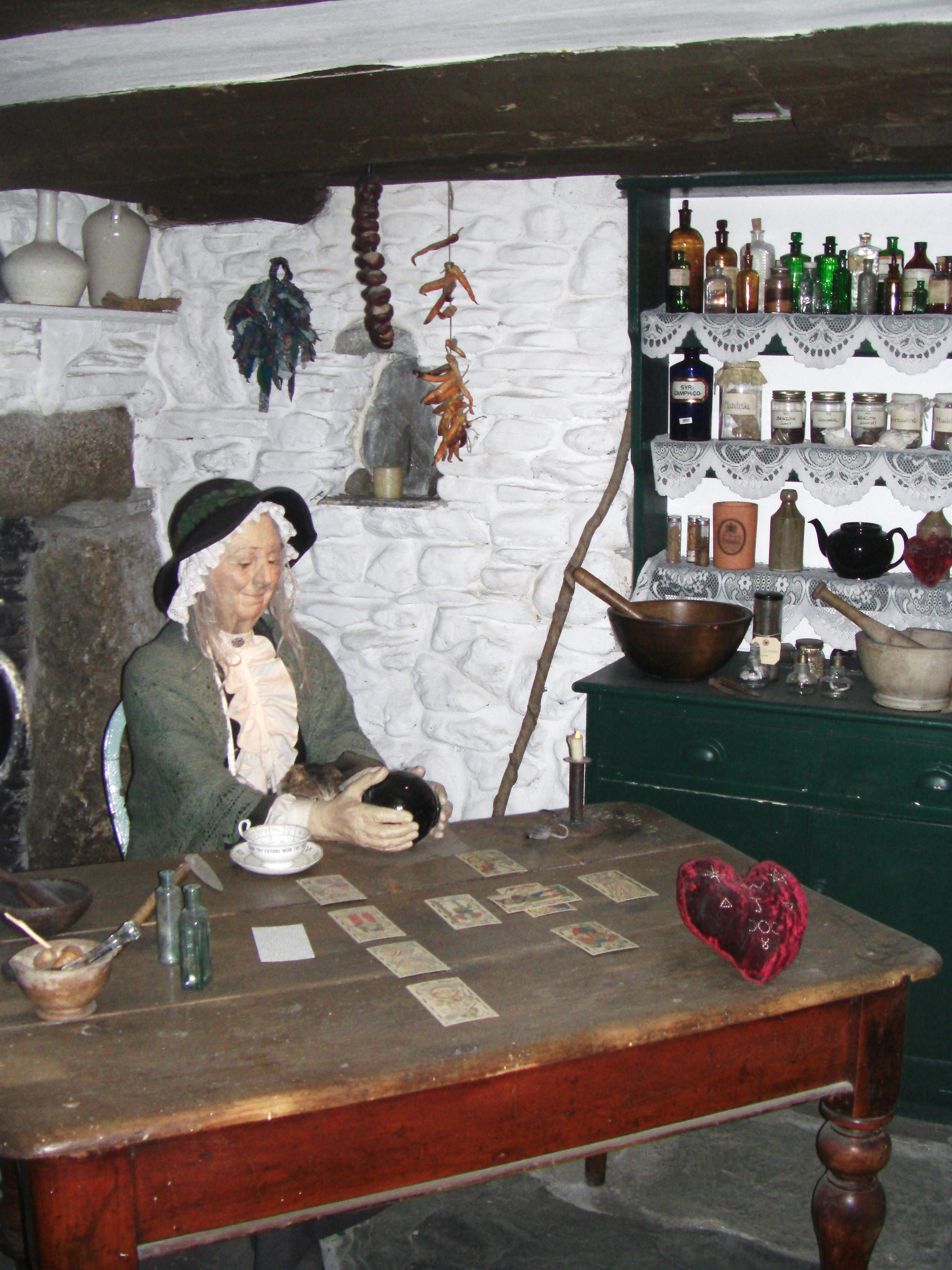
A model of a 19th-century cunning woman in her house, at the Museum of Witchcraft and Magic in Boscastle, England

Cunning folk, also known as folk healers or wise folk, were practitioners of folk medicine, helpful folk magic and divination in Europe from the Middle Ages until the 20th century. Their practices were known as the cunning craft. Their services also included thwarting witchcraft. Although some cunning folk were denounced as witches themselves, they made up a minority of those accused, and the common people generally made a distinction between the two. The name 'cunning folk' originally referred to folk-healers and magic-workers in Britain, but the name is now applied as an umbrella term for similar people in other parts of Europe.

== European names ==
Names given to folk-healers and magic-workers in Europe include:

- the Danish kloge folk ("wise folk")
- the Dutch toverdokters ("magic-doctors") or duivelbanners ("devil-banners")
- the Finnish and Karelian tietäjät ("knowers")
- the French devins-guérisseurs ("soothsayer-healers") and leveurs de sorts ("curse-lifters")
- the German Hexenmeister ("witch masters") or Kräuterhexen ("herb witches")
- the Irish bean feasa ("woman of knowledge"), banfháidh or fáidhbhean ("seeress")
- the Italian fattucchiere ("fixers"), guaritori ("healers"), benandanti ("good walkers") or Segnatori ("signers").
- the Portuguese curandeiros/as, benzedeiros/as ("blessers") or mulheres de virtude ("women of virtue")
- the Russian znakhar, znatkiy, vedun, vedma(k) ("knower", "witch(er)")
- the Slavic vedmaki ("warlocks")
- the Spanish curanderos ("healers")
- the Swedish klok gumma ("wise old woman") or klok gubbe ("wise old man")
- the Turkish "kocakarı" ("wise woman")
- the Ukrainian znahar ("someone, who knows")
- the Welsh dynion hysbys (from Welsh, meaning "cunning men")
- the Jewish Baal Shem, a practitioner of Practical Kabbalah, folk healer, and thaumaturge (miracle worker)
- the Basque petrikilo, sandalari, enplastero, sasimediku, sasisendagile, jainko-txiki

== Scandinavia ==
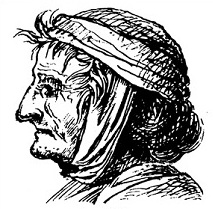
The Swedish cunning woman Gertrud Ahlgren of Gotland (1782–1874), drawing by Pehr Arvid Säve 1870

In Scandinavia, the klok gumma ("wise woman") or klok gubbe ("wise man"), and collectively De kloka ("The Wise ones"), as they were known in Swedish, were usually elder members of the community who acted as folk healers and midwives as well as using folk magic such as magic rhymes. In Denmark, they were called klog mand ("wise man") and klog kone ("wise woman") and collectively as kloge folk ("wise folk").

Many Norwegian and Danish practitioners of folk magic and medicine would have a copy of the "Svartebok" (or "black book"), a tome that, according to some, was written by Cyprianus, that is, the Saint of Necromancers, Cyprian of Antioch, and to others to have been the Sixth and Seventh books of the Bible (or "Books of Moses" as the Pentateuch is known in Denmark and Norway) that were left out of the official Old Testament by the learned so that the common folk would not learn the knowledge held within the text. A formulary found in a "black book" recovered from a farm near Elverum contains many formulas such as one for a toothache that commands the user of the charm to write the words "Agerin, Nagerin, Vagerin, Jagerin, Ipagerin, Sipia" on a piece of paper using a new pen, cut the paper into three small pieces, place the first piece onto the tooth in the evening and in the morning spit the piece into the fire. This should then be repeated with the other pieces. Another charm used for helping a woman who is having a difficult labour says to take two white lily roots and give them to the mother to eat.

There is an old idea that it was "Klok gumma" who often fell victim to the Witch Trials in the 17th century, but this does not appear to be true. However, some "wise women" and "wise men" were punished, not for witchcraft but often under the indictment point of "superstition" (Swedish: Vidskepelse). In the 1670s, the wise man Johan Eriksson of Knutby was sentenced to seven gauntlet for "superstition", and again in the 1680s to nine. Per Ericsson of Dalarna, who read the diseases in wine, was punished both in 1720 and 1726. Brita Biörn of Gotland said in court that she learned to heal the sick when she spent some time in the underworld, and she was sentenced to prison terms in both 1722 and 1737. The punishment of Sweden's "cunning folk" only seemed to have the opposite effect. Ericsson said that his clients had been coming in greater numbers after the rulings against him, and that he would be forced to hide if he was to obey the court and refrain from his practice, and in the Biörn case, the vicar complained that people from throughout the country came to seek her help, and relied on her as a god after her first sentence. The sentences, in reality, had the effect of good advertising, and Brita's daughter and granddaughter's daughter were also healing women.

There are many examples of well-known "cunning folk" who were known far beyond their village boundaries, such as Ingeborg i Mjärhult in the 18th century and Kisamor and Gota-Lena in the 19th century. In the 16th century, Brigitta Andersdotter was often hired by Queen Margaret Leijonhufvud. In Norway some women such as Mor Sæther (1793–1851), Anna Brandfjeld (1810–1905) and Valborg Valland (1821–1903) achieved national fame, unusual for women of the time.

The customs persisted well into the 20th century, until the medical doctor became more accessible to the public. In the 19th century, every neighbourhood in Norway had at least one folk-healer. Such beliefs in folk-medicine, magic, and the use of "black books" were taken by migrants to the Americas. However, many beliefs died out in Norwegian-American communities around the 1920s with many not having knowledge of the subject or of the "black book". Knowledge of these beliefs did last longer in Norway, even if they were not commonly believed in by Norwegians.

== Britain ==
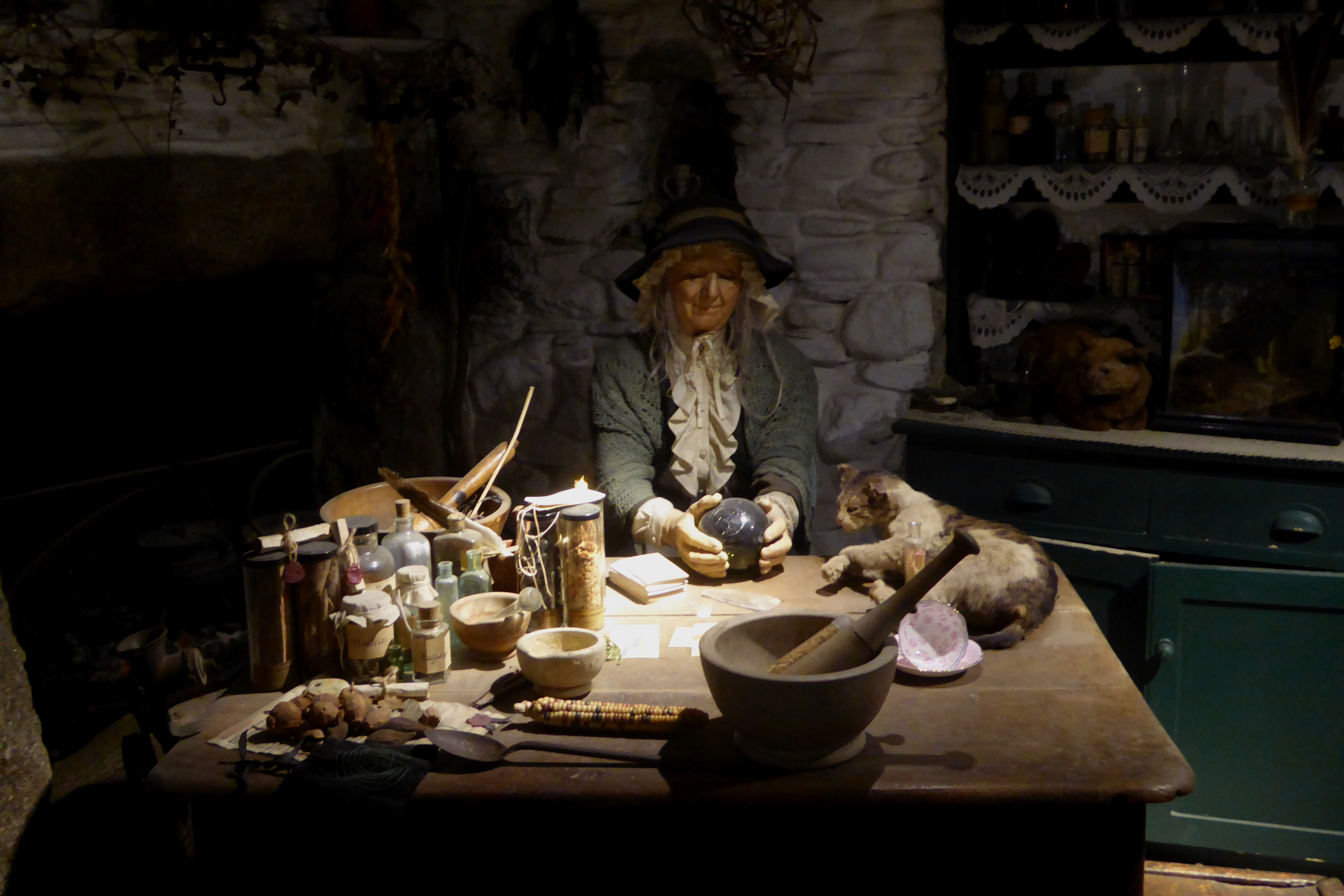
Diorama of a cunning woman in the Museum of Witchcraft and Magic

The term "cunning man" or "cunning woman" was mostly used in England and Wales from the early modern era onwards. They were also called "wizards", "wise men", "wise women", "conjurers" or in Welsh "dyn(es) hysbys" (knowing man or woman). In Cornwall they were sometimes called "pellars", which some etymologists suggest originated from the term "expellers", referring to the practice of expelling evil spirits. The term "white witch" was rarely used before the 20th century, as a "witch" generally referred to an evil person.

In the Middle Ages, those who worked magic in Anglo-Saxon England were referred to by several names. Some of the spells and charms that had been used in Anglo-Saxon paganism continued to be used following Christianization. Historian Owen Davies noted, "although some such pre-Christian magic continued, to label it pagan is to misrepresent the people who used it and the context in which it was used."

Some Christian clergy and secular authorities tried to smear the cunning folk by falsely branding them 'witches' and associating them with harmful 'witchcraft'. However, there was no widespread persecution of them, largely because most common people firmly distinguished between the two: witches were seen as being harmful, and cunning folk as helpful.

In the 15th and 16th centuries, there had been no attempt to ban the cunning craft, although private lawsuits had been brought against some cunning folk by clients who felt that they had been cheated out of their money. Under the Witchcraft Act 1541, a person could be executed for using magic or conjuration to harm others, to cast a love spell, or to find treasure. This law was repealed no later than 1547, which Davies believes was due to those in power changing their opinion: they thought that either the death penalty was too harsh, or that magic was a moral issue that should be dealt with by the church rather than the state.

For the following few decades, the magical practices of the cunning folk remained legal. In 1563, another law was passed against "Conjurations, Enchantments and Witchcrafts". This law was not as harsh as its predecessor, with the death penalty being reserved for those who were believed to have murdered someone by magical means. This law had little effect on the cunning folk, as "the attention and focus of the courts shifted away from the activities of cunning-folk and towards the maleficium of supposed witches". It was unusual for a cunning man or woman to be accused of witchcraft; in the county of Essex for instance, four hundred people had been put on trial for witchcraft, but only four of those were cunning folk.

The Enlightenment saw a change in attitudes, especially amongst the educated elite. The 'Witchcraft Act 1735' repealed earlier laws against witchcraft. Unlike those laws, it did not accept the existence of magic or witches. Instead, anyone who claimed to use magic was to be punished as a swindler and could be imprisoned for one year.

== Germany ==
The belief in cunning folk and the use of "white magic" to be used for healing and as protection against "black magic" was once widespread in Germany; however, during the early modern period such practices gradually became less accepted by the authorities, partly because the belief in "white magic" was viewed by the church authorities to be contrary to Biblical teachings and partly due to the loss of revenues for certain groups such as barber-surgeons and physicians, as was the case in Rothenburg ob der Tauber in which periodical action was taken against users of "white magic". The usual punishment was banishment rather than execution as was common for others convicted of witchcraft and the use of "black magic"

In Germany practitioners of folk-magic were almost always female; however, by contrast the Hexenmeister (also a term for a warlock) or Hexenfinder who hunted witches and "neutralised" them on behalf of society was always male.

== Ireland ==
In Ireland, names for the cunning folk in Irish include bean feasa ("wise woman"); banfháidh or fáidhbhean ("seeress"); or fear feasa ("wise man"). As in other countries, they provided services of magical healing, folk medicine, divination, and finding lost and stolen property. It was believed they could cure illnesses in both humans and livestock that were caused by fairies or witches. Their charms included a short rhyme or prayer referencing Jesus, Mary, or the saints. This was paired with a repetitive motion or ritual, and an object. They also performed funeral tasks like preparing a body for a wake and keening over the body. Gearoid Ó Crualaoich wrote that the bean feasa was also "an oracular authority for her community regarding the meaning and significance of experiences they fail to understand". Biddy Early (1798–1872) was a famous Irish cunning-woman.

== Italy ==
The names used for cunning-folk in Italy vary from region to region, although such names include praticos (wise people), guaritori (healers), fattucchiere (fixers), donne che aiutano (women who help) and mago, maga or maghiardzha (sorcerers). At times, they were sometimes called streghe (witches), although usually only "behind their backs or by those who either are sceptical of their powers or believe they deal in black magic." Unlike in other parts of Europe, such as Britain, the cunning profession survived the 20th century and into the early 21st, allowing Italian-American sociologist Sabina Magliocco to make a brief study of them (2009).

As in the rest of Europe, the primary role of the Italian cunning-folk was apparently in healing, both through the use of herbs and through spiritual healing. The former required knowledge about various plants and herbs on the behalf of the cunning-person, although the spiritual healing was believed to come from an inner power, known as la forza (power), la virtù (virtue) or il Segno (the sign). Such healing was often in the form of removing the malocchio, or evil eye, which had cursed someone.

Italian cunning craft was, and continued to remain rooted in the country's Roman Catholicism, which is evident from the use of charms and prayers, which often call upon the aid of saints. Such magical practitioners also widely believed that they dealt with spirit beings, both benevolent (who would aid them) and malevolent (whom they would have to combat). The latter included the unquiet dead as well as supernatural witches who were believed to cause harm to people, whilst the former included ancestors, the helpful dead and saints, who could help defeat these malevolent entities. Magical tools were also utilised by Italian cunning-folk, and whilst these varied between both regions and practitioners, these commonly include fiber ropes or cords to bind, knives or scissors to cut away illness, and mirrors and weapons to reflect or scare away malevolent spirits.

In Italy, the folk‑healing tradition known as Segnature is practised by rural segnatori and segnatrici, who employ ritual gestures - “signs” - alongside secret prayers to cure illness, remove curses such as the malocchio (evil eye), and influence natural phenomena. Drawing on oral transmission within families and community networks, Segnature exemplifies an enduring vernacular healing system rooted in pre‑Christian animism but syncretised with Catholic symbolism. In her 2024 monograph Italian Witchcraft and Shamanism: The Tradition of Segnature, Indigenous and Trans‑cultural Shamanic Traditions in Italy, Dr Angela Puca presents extensive ethnographic research demonstrating how these practices constitute a living form of indigenous Italian shamanism—systematised through gestures, verbal formulas, and initiation, and are experiencing renewed visibility through social media and contemporary spiritual frameworks. This positions Segnature as a coherent strand within Italy's cunning folk tradition, bridging folk Catholicism, ancestral healing, and modern esoteric sensibilities.

== Eastern Europe ==
Zagovory—the use of verbal incantations—arose from Slavic pagan prayers and incantations, whether spoken, whispered or sung. These incantations have been traditionally accompanied by associated rituals, some of which are, or were, physically demanding and strenuous. One example calls for the zagovory practitioner to have either a full set of teeth, or a knife as a symbolic substitute for teeth that were missing.

The traditions survived into the Christian era, largely through a process of syncretism and Christianization of the traditional rites, in which images of, and lore about, Jesus were added to the existing traditions. For instance, a healing would now be done in the name of Jesus, citing a story from the Bible.

Societal concern about the practice of witchcraft centered on whether someone was using incantations or rites to cause harm. People in Russian and Ukrainian societies usually shunned those said to be witches, unless they felt they needed help against supernatural forces. Impotence, stomach pains, barrenness, hernias, abscesses, epileptic seizures, and convulsions were all attributed to evil (or witchcraft). In Russia, three quarters of those accused of witchcraft were men.

== American ==
North and South America have had their own variants of these, which had taken on aspects of African and Native culture. While most of Latin America also uses Curandero/ Curandera, Appalachia had the Mountain Witches, possibly taking their name from an attempt to label similar practices amongst the Amish as Witchcraft to persecute German immigrants in Appalachia in the 1700s. The Amish practitioners are generally referred to as Braucherei, and the concept is known to them as Pow-wow. The Creole also have their own, Traiteurs. Among the Gullah-Geechee of the Carolinas is a folk healing tradition within the Hoodoo religion known as rootwork that is a combination of African, Native and European beliefs. Such folk healers there are known as Conjure Doctors or Root Doctors. Archaeological discoveries also show folk magic being practiced amongst the English colonists, with archaeological discoveries of magical talismans such as Witch Bottles, the tradition appearing to have continued up to, at least, the Civil War. All of the above traditional forms of folk magic practitioners continued within their respective communities into the 20th century, with many practices still alive and well.

== See also ==
- Cunning folk traditions and the Latter Day Saint movement
- European witchcraft
- Folk Christianity
- Folk healer
- Folk religion
- Vedmak
- Witch doctor
- Wise Old Man and Wise Old Woman, a Jungian archetype
