= Gertrud Ahlgren =

Swedish cunning woman

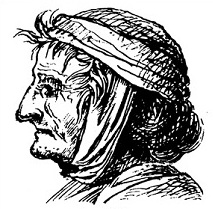
- The Swedish cunning woman Gertrud Ahlgren of Gotland (1782-1874), drawing by Pehr Arvid Säve 1870.
- Born: Gertrud Olofsdotter Ahlgren; 1782; Sweden
- Died: 1874 (aged 91–92); Sweden
- Other name: Hejnumskäringen
- Occupations: Cunning woman, folk healer
- Years active: 1813–1870
- Known for: Folk medicine and healing practices

Gertrud Olofsdotter Ahlgren (1782–1874), known under the name Hejnumskäringen, was a noted Swedish cunning woman, active on Gotland in 1813–1870. She is a well-known figure in the folklore of Gotland.

== Early life ==
Ahlgren was born in Hejnum in 1782, as a descendant of the famous cunning woman Brita Biörn. She succeeded her mother, Greta Olofsdotter Enderberg, as cunning woman in 1813, and was like her, known under the name Hejnumskäringen, ("The Crone of Hejnum").

== Work ==
She lived in a small cottage at a three-way crossing east of Hejnum church. She assisted her mother and replaced her when she stopped working in 1813, and continued herself until her eyesight begun to deteriorate in 1870. Mother and daughter were both known for their herbal medicines, but were also attributed magical powers.

In a Letter to the editor in Wisby Weckoblad (The Weekly Visby Paper) in 1836, the local doctor in Visby, Andreas Andrée, critically described her and her mother's activity in a warning against cunning women in general:

"The cunning woman of Gotland: The Crown of them all, the so called Hejnum Crone, mother and daughter, has for many years without protest continued their fraudulent Confidence trick... Should you ask who these wise women are, you will usually find them to be from the worst class of people, rough, ignorant and often ill reputed females..."

Despite the fact that legitimate medical doctors started to become more accessible to the public, Ahlgren herself commented on her own success and popularity with the words:

"The doctors cure by new [methods], illnesses are old and I cure by old [methods]".

== Sources ==
- Wall, Jan-Inge (1989). Hon var en gång tagen under jorden-: visionsdikt och sjukdomsbot i gotländska trolldomsprocesser = Once she was taken into the earth- : visionary tales and healing in Gotland witchcraft trials. Skrifter / utgivna genom Dialekt- och folkminnesarkivet i Uppsala. Ser. B, Folkminnen och folkliv, 0348–4483; 19. Uppsala: Dialekt- och folkminnesarkivet. Libris 7750067. ISBN 91-85540-44-7 (inb.)
- http://www.gotland.net/sv/kvinnfolki/hejnumkallingen
