= Gyde Spandemager =

Gyde Spandemager (died 1543) was an alleged Danish witch. She was one of the first women executed for sorcery in Denmark and in Scandinavia.

== Background ==
In 1543 King Christian III of Denmark equipped a war fleet of 40 ships to chase an imperial Dutch fleet away from the coast of Norway to the Netherlands. Outside Helsingør the fleet was stuck in a calm and the whole project failed. The failure was blamed on Spandemager, who was said to have gathered a group of witches in a valley outside the city and enchanted the ships. Spandemager was arrested and interrogated through torture.

== Trial ==
The trial against Gyde led to the accusation of several people in 1543-45, all accused of "enchant[ing] the ship of His Majesty, so as to prevent it from getting any wind". Gyde was described as the wife of a merchant. Her trial was handled by the royal governor Eske Bilde. She confessed her guilt during torture, and pointed out several people of both sexes, including vicars, which led to the expansion of the witch trial, as her words were taken very seriously. She also said that the enchantments would never disappear unless she was allowed to remove them personally. The people pointed out were arrested and tortured "so hard their limbs were separated" (Malmö, 3 December 1543), but no one other than Gyde confessed. A merchant's wife from Helsingör was released after she was given an alibi by the citizens of the city saying that she was somewhere else at the time when she was supposed to have been with the witches performing the enchantment. In November 1543, the King demanded for "the rightful old principal of the witches" to be burned. She seems to have been interrogated for a while after this.

== Context ==
This was the first of three famous cases where marine catastrophes were blamed on sorcery and resulted in witch trials in Denmark. In 1566, several Danish ships sunk in a storm outside Gotland; women in Copenhagen were blamed for causing the storm to keep some goods which had been placed in their care by one of the captains of the sunken ships, and were arrested and burnt. In 1589, women in Copenhagen were blamed for causing the fleet which was to take Anne of Denmark to her wedding with King James VI of Scotland to turn and go to Norway by making a storm.

This was one of the earliest witch trials in Denmark, after Karen Grottes and Bodil Lauritzen, who were burnt in Stege in 1539. In 1530, the "wives of Lars Kylling and Jørgen Olsen" were burned on Bornholm, but the island was at this point (1525–75) ruled by Lübeck.

== See also ==
- Anna Koldings
- Anne Palles
