= Agnieszka Szymkowa =

- Died: c. June 14, 1731; Gocanowo, Brześć Kujawski Voivodeship, Polish–Lithuanian Commonwealth
- Criminal charges: Witchcraft

Agnieszka Szymkowa (died 1731) was a Kuyavian woman who was accused of sorcery.

She was prosecuted for witchcraft in Gocanowo, having been accused by another accused witch of being her accomplice. She died under torture.

The case against her is the subject of Anna Koprowska-Głowacka's book Czarownice z Pomorza i Kujaw.

== See also ==
- Witch trials in Poland
- Katarzyna Paprocka
