= Vedmak =

Slavic warlock or male witch

Creature information
- Other name: Vidmak
- Folklore: Slavic paganism

Origin
- Country: Ukraine, Poland, Belarus, Russia

In Slavic mythology, a vedmak (Note: Belarusian: вядзьмак, вядзьмар; Bulgarian: вещер [ˈvɛʃtɛr]: Croatian: vještac; Czech: vědmák; Macedonian: вештер [ˈvɛʃtɛr]; Polish: wiedźmak; Russian: ведьмак [vʲɪdʲˈmak]; Serbian: вештац; Ukrainian: відьмак [widʲˈmɑk].) is a warlock or male witch, the female equivalent (witch) being vedma. This role greatly focuses on the Shamanic aspects of Slavic paganism.

For example, they treat people and animals. On the other hand, they are thought to be people connected to the devil, and are capable of bringing harm by sending illnesses, killing cattle, spoiling a harvest, etc. The word was also used as an insult. A vedmak can turn into any animal or any object.

== Etymology ==
Vedmak stems from Proto-Slavic *vědět ("to know") and Old East Slavic вѣдь ("knowledge; witchcraft", compare the use of the term "cunning" in English folklore).

Language	Names				
Belarusian	вядзьмак	вядзьмар	ведзьмак	ведзьмар	
Bulgarian	вещер				
Croatian	vještac				
Czech	vědmák				
Macedonian	вештер				
Polish	wiedźmak	wiedźmarz			
Russian	ведьмак				
Serbian	вештац				
Ukrainian	Відьма́к	відьма́р	відьма́н	відьма́ч	відьмун

== The Witcher ==
Under the influence of The Witcher fantasy saga by Andrzej Sapkowski, the term vedmak is sometimes also rendered as "witcher" in English in certain contexts. The word used for "witcher" in the original Polish version of the novels, "wiedźmin", was coined by Sapkowski himself as a neologism, and the word "wiedźmak" (cognate of "vedmak") is used in the books only as a derogatory term for witchers. "Ведьмак" is also the word used to translate "wiedźmin" in the Russian translation of the books.

== See also ==
- Witch (etymology)
- European witchcraft
- Slavic mythology
- Krsnik (vampire hunter)
- Shamanism
