= Konstanty Majeranowski =

Polish journalist, poet, and writer

Konstanty Majeranowski (1787–1851) was a Polish journalist, poet and writer.
