= Christence Kruckow =

Danish noblewoman executed as a witch

- Born: 1558
- Died: 26 June 1621 (aged 62–63); Copenhagen, Denmark–Norway
- Cause of death: Decapitation
- Parent(s): Axel Nielsen Kruckow; Anne Mogensdatter Bielke

Christence (Christenze) Akselsdatter Kruckow (circa 1558 – 26 June 1621) was a Danish noblewoman who was executed for witchcraft after having been accused twice. She is one of the most well known victims of the witch hunt in Denmark, and one of few members of the nobility to have been executed for sorcery in Scandinavia, and the only one in Denmark.

== Life ==
She was the daughter of the nobleman Axel Nielsen Kruckow (d. 1558) and Anne Mogensdatter Bielke. Her family belonged to the lower nobility. As was the custom in the Danish nobility, Christence Kruckow was sent to be raised in another noble family than her own, in order to learn how to be a lady of a noble estate before marriage, and she was sent to be raised at the Nakkebølle estate by the nobleman Eiler Brockenhuus and his wife Berte Friis.

=== First trial: the Nakkebølle-sagen ===
In 1582, Eiler Brockenhuus became a widower. Reportedly, Christence Kruckow had hoped to marry him herself, but in 1584 he married Anne Bille instead. Christence Kruckow remained in the household, essentially as a lady's companion.

Between 1584 and 1596, Anne Bille bore seventeen children, who all died in infancy. This was a major misfortune for her, and there were rumours that she had killed her children herself. In 1596, Anne Bille's cousin Anne Hardenberg (1566-1625) likewise gave birth to a dead child, and blamed her misfortune on witchcraft, which resulted in the execution of three women in a witch trial known as the Gyldenstierne-sagen ('Gyldenstierne Affair').

Following the example of her cousin, Anne Bille started to consider that her own misfortune was caused by sorcery as well, and, in August 1596, she had one of the women of the Nakkebølle estate, Ousse Lauritzes (or Åse Lauridses), charged for sorcery. This resulted in a witch trial known as the Nakkebølle-sagen ('Nakkebølle Affair').

Ousse Lauritzes was imprisoned and interrogated on the private prison of the estate of Nakkebølle by Anne Bille herself, who was present in the interrogation chamber when Ousse was tortured. Ousse confessed that the marital bed of Anne had been cursed at their wedding bed by the demon Gunder Kaeldersvends, and three other witches led by Christenze Kruckow. The other two women confirmed her story, and one of them, Johanne Jensens, added that Kruckow had been present at a Witches' Sabbath at Bloksberg.

When the witch trial had been arranged on Nakkebølle, Christence Kruckow had left and moved back to her birth family. As a member of the nobility, it was a sensitive matter to charge her with witchcraft. Her brother Jens Kruckow defended his sister and complained to the king that the accusation was to be regarded as slander against the family name of Kruckow. The royal council decided that the case against Christence Kruckow, as a member of the nobility, was not to be pursued further and the two noble families were encouraged to reconcile on the king's wish.

Ousse Lauritzes, Johanne Jensens and a third woman were all burned at the stake for witchcraft. Christenze Kruckow moved in with her second brother Eiler Kruckow, and in 1607 to her sister in Ålborg.

=== Second trial: the Ålborg witch trial ===
In 1611, rumors were circulating in the city of Ålborg of strange diseases and speaking cats and pigs in the cemetery, which resulted in a witch trial in 1612. Kruckow was not implicated in this trial, but the city continued to be tormented by witchcraft speculations in the following years.

In 1617, a new witchcraft law was introduced by king Christian IV of Denmark, who was a firm believer in witchcraft and who encouraged the local authorities all over the kingdom to make use of the new law and investigate all suspected sorcery in their areas. This resulted in a major witch hysteria all over Denmark, and in 1618, it came to Ålborg.

Kruckow was the neighbor of the priest of the church of Vor Frue Kirke, and when his wife became mentally ill in 1618, he claimed that she had been bewitched. He pointed out the fact that some of the women denounced by the witches of the 1612 witch trial had never been investigated, and demanded that the case be reopened and those pointed out as witches be arrested. In 1619, the authorities reopened the case and investigated. Several women were arrested, confessed their guilt and pointed out Kruckow as one of them, but the authorities did not wish to accuse a member of the nobility.

The king, Christian IV of Denmark, however, who wished his whole realm to be purified of witchcraft, himself issued an investigation against her in 1620. He collected evidence from several witnesses. A priest accused her of having caused the death of his wife; Peder Poulsen had seen her as one of the witches present when a witch gave birth to an ogre; and Sören Tommermand had been victim of a knife attack after Kruckow had promised him misfortune. When these testimonies had been prepared, the king allowed for the local authorities in Ålborg to continue with the case against the arrested witches and to arrest Kruckow herself.

Christenze Kruckow was arrested and imprisoned. Kruckow admitted that she had cursed the bridal bed of Anne Bille years before, and that she had disliked the wife of the priest. Four of the other accused women were burned at the stake. The case against Kruckow was again complicated because of her noble birth, since she had the privilege to appeal to the king and be judged by the royal council.

In May 1621, Kruckow was transferred to the Copenhagen Castle. She was judged guilty of witchcraft and sentenced to death. The punishment for sorcery was to be burned to death. Kruckow, however, was decapitated with a sword as a privilege of her noble status. She was then buried according to all appropriate ceremonials of the church, a burial not always given to executed witches.

== Legacy ==
Christence Kruckow donated 1.000 daler in her will to scholarship for poor students, which came to be known as the Legatum Decollatæ Virginis ('The Legacy of the Decapitated Virgin'), which was functioning until the 20th century.

== In popular culture ==
Olga Ravn's 2023 novel The Wax Child tells Kruckow's story from the point of view of a long-buried wax doll created by Kruckow.

== Sources ==
- Den eneste adelige heks (in Danish)
- Jan Guillou: Häxornas försvarare (The defender of the witches) (In Swedish)
- Jorgen Carl Jacobsen: Christenze Kruckow. En adelig Troldkvinde fra Chr. IV's Tid ['Christenze Kruckow. A noble witch from the age of Chr. the 4th']
- Dansk kvindebiografisk leksikon
