= Ane Koldings =

Alleged Danish witch

Ane Koldings (also called Anne or Anna Koldings; died 1590) was an alleged Danish witch. She was a main defendant in the Copenhagen witch trials held during the summer of 1590, which were held as a parallel to the famous North Berwick Witch trials in Edinburgh in Scotland.

== Background ==
The winter of 1589, Princess Anne of Denmark departed from Copenhagen to marry King James VI of Scotland. A great storm arose, which almost caused the ship to sink. The ship of the princess eventually harbored in Kristiania, Norway (now Oslo). James VI joined her there, and the wedding took place in Norway instead of in Scotland, as had been planned. In the spring of 1590, after a few months at the Danish court, James VI and Anna returned to Scotland. The voyage from Denmark was also beset by storms. The Danish court at that time was greatly perplexed by witchcraft and the black arts, and this must have impressed on the young King James.

== 1590 Copenhagen witch hunt ==
In the summer of 1590, a great witch hunt was instituted in Copenhagen. The Danish minister of finance, Christoffer Valkendorff, was accused by the Admiral Peder Munk of having equipped the royal ship so insufficiently that it had been unable to withstand the weather. He defended himself by saying that the storm had been caused by witches in the house of Karen Vaevers ('Karen the Weaver'), who had sent little demons in empty barrels who had climbed up the keels of the ships and caused the storm.

== Confession ==
The background to this was a confession given by a woman by the name of Anna Koldings. In May 1590, Koldings was imprisoned in Copenhagen. She had been judged guilty of witchcraft in a case unrelated to the royal fleet, and was in prison awaiting her execution. Anne Koldings was considered a very dangerous witch, and referred to as Mother of the Devil. She was treated as somewhat of a celebrity in prison and displayed to visitors: she is known to have confessed to two priests and three female visitors while in prison.

Valkendorff, who was at this point blamed for the fiasco of the royal fleet, asked the Mayor of Copenhagen to question Koldings if she had been involved in bewitching the fleet. During torture, Koldings described how a group of women had gathered in the house of Karen, where they had caused the storm of the princess' ship by sending small devils up the keels of the ship.

== Execution ==
Koldings was executed by burning in July 1590. On her confession, her accomplices were arrested the same month. Koldings had named five other women as accomplices, among them Malin, wife of the mayor of Helsingor, and Margrethe Jakob Skrivers. All the women were arrested and charged. The spouse of Skrivers unsuccessfully tried to defend her, and was instead arrested and charged himself. Karen Vaevers was arrested in July. She confessed to have been one of them who, together with Koldings, attended the gathering of witches which caused the storms, which hunted the royal ship, by use of witchcraft, and named other women as accomplices.

Twelve women aside from Koldings were executed for involvement in this witch trial. In September, two women were burnt as witches at Kronborg. James VI heard news from Denmark regarding this, and decided to set up his own tribunal.

== See also ==
- Agnes Sampson
- Gyde Spandemager
- Maren Spliid

== Other sources ==
- Åberg, Alf, Häxorna: de stora trolldomsprocesserna i Sverige 1668-1676, Esselte studium/Akademiförl., Göteborg, 1989 (in Swedish)
- Oluf Nielsen: Kjøbenhavns Historie og Beskrivelse III. Kjøbenhavn i Aarene 1536-1660 [The history and description of Copenhagen volume III. Copenhagen in 1536-1660] Kbh., G. E. C. Gad (In Danish)
- Rune Hagen: Blant konger og hekser [Among kings and witches] (In Norwegian)
- P. G. Maxwell-Stuart (2007) The Great Scottish Witch-Hunt: Europe's Most Obsessive Dynasty (Tempus) ISBN 978-0752444253
- Liv Helene Willumsen, 'Witchcraft against Royal Danish Ships in 1589 and the Transnational Transfer of Ideas', IRSS, 45 (2020), pp. 54-99
