= Doritte Nippers =

Danish woman executed for sorcery

Doritte (Dorothea) Nippers (died 1571), was a Danish woman who was executed for sorcery.

Nippers was a widow with one daughter, and a successful hawker in Helsingör, where she is noted to have been the leader of a group of businesswomen, referred to as "Doritte and her gang". She was involved in a long conflict with her male business competitors Per Boesen and Bent Hallandsfarer.

In 1551, she was put on trial accused of not paying her taxes and of buying up the products of the farmers before they could put on sale. She defended herself, won the case and was acquitted of all charges, and warned Per Boesen and Bent Hallandsfarer with divine punishment if they continued to meddle in her business methods. During the following years, the law on women's rights to conduct business in Denmark was tightened as they were not given the status of family providers. Several laws were issued which worsened their terms, such as the ban on women's rights to trade between Helsingør and Helsingborg, and the well-known business conflicts of Nippers took place against these changes in Danish business life.

In 1571, she was again sued for illegal business transactions. However, this time, the charge included an accusation of witchcraft, and she was pointed out as the witch colleague of another female hawker, Karine Lass Munchs. Nippers denied the charges, but she also denied having been involved in the 1551 case, which destroyed her credibility and contributed to her guilty verdict, as she was assumed to be lying about the witch charge as well. Munchs was freed because of the support of her family and other character witnesses, but Nippers was burned at the stake in late 1571.
