= Gyldenstierne-sagen =

Gyldenstierne-sagen ('Gyldenstierne Affair') was a witch trial which took place in Denmark between 1596 and 1598. Alongside the Nakkebølle-sagen, it was one of two big witchcraft cases in the 1590s which was essentially caused by feuds among the Danish noble families.

In 1596, the noblewoman Anne Hardenberg (1566-1625) gave birth to a dead child, after several years of depression. She blamed her misfortune on witchcraft, which resulted in the execution of three peasant women, whom her husband Johan Rud arrested, imprisoned and interrogated in his private estate. When one of the tortured women pointed out the noblewoman Karen Gyldenstierne, who was the long-standing enemy of Johan Rud, the whole case was transformed in to a slander case which was put before the king, who in 1598 dissolved it by encouraging the two noble families to reconcile.
