= Segnature =

Traditional folk healing practice from Italy

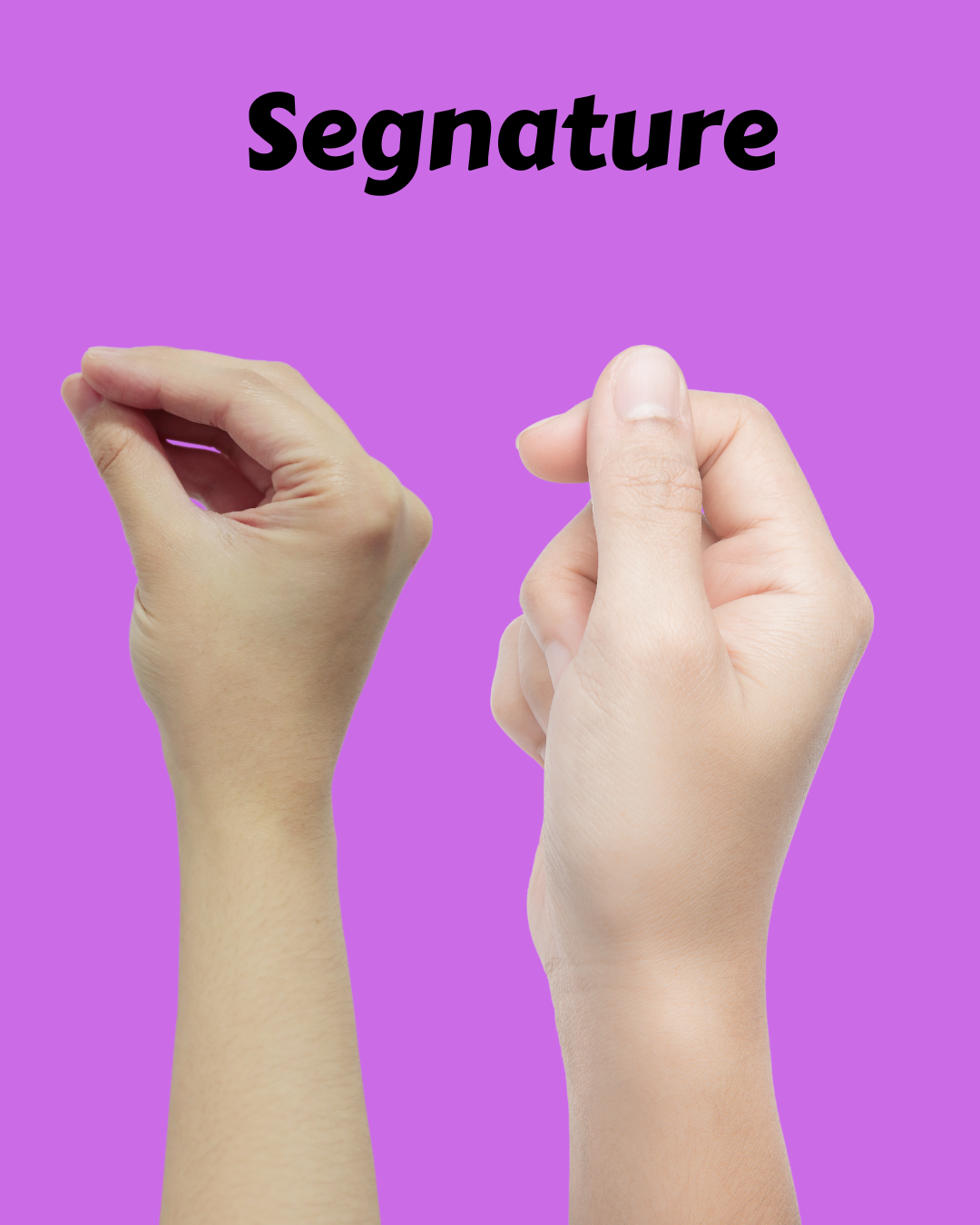
Segnature involves hand gestures to perform healing, curse removal, etc.

Segnature is a traditional folk healing practice from Italy. It uses hand gestures, secret prayers, and signs. It is used to cure sickness, remove curses such as the evil eye, protect people, and influence natural forces such as the weather. Segnature has persisted through Italian history because its roots are in a cultural heritage that blends pre-Christian folk beliefs with Catholic ritual elements. By adapting to social changes, it has become a vital part of local healing traditions. Healers who use Segnature are known as Segnatori. The practice involves drawing signs on the body or objects while reciting prayers or words of power. These are often passed down through family or community lineages. Segnature has been and continues to be practised in rural areas. In recent years, it has seen a resurgence through social media, where practitioners share knowledge with one another. Recent academic research has begun to recognize Segnature as a form of indigenous Italian shamanism. It is a folk tradition that blends cultural identity, healing, and spirituality. The word "segnature," which translates as "signs" or "marks," emphasises the importance of ritual gestures in the practice. Often misinterpreted and viewed as a type of witchcraft, Segnature has an important place in Italian culture and is centred on protection and healing. The names for the practice can vary by region, for example, "Janare" or "Masca".

== Etymology ==
The term Segnature (with the singular form being Segnatura) originates from the Italian verb segnare, which translates to "to mark" or "to sign." In Italian folk healing, Segnature refers to the signs or gestures crafted by hand by practitioners known as Segnatori. Paired with prayers or words of power, these signs offer protection, healing, or influence over natural forces. The literal interpretation of "signing" or "marking" shows the significance of the gestures in this practice, which act as both physical and spiritual factors during rituals.

These signs often appear as crosses or other holy symbols drawn over an affected body part, on items like blessed oil or water, or in the air, serving as ways to call upon divine or ancestral help.

Regional variations exist across Italy, reflecting the country's linguistic and cultural diversity. For example, in Campania and parts of southern Italy, healers called Janare use similar ritual gestures for healing and protection. In the Piedmont region, the folk magic practitioners known as Masca (female) and Mascun (male) engage in comparable practices, although these terms carry their own distinct local histories and connotations.

The term is notably prevalent in the Emilia-Romagna region, where ethnographic studies have documented its use as a systematized tradition of gestures and sacred language passed down through families and through secret initiations, often performed at certain times, such as Christmas Eve.

The term Segnature reflects a blend of body, language, and spirituality. "Signing" connects it to European folk healing, where the cross or other ritual marks serve as protective and healing symbols. This shows the persistence of ancient cultural themes, merging pre-Christian beliefs with Catholic rituals.

== Origins ==
With a centuries-old history, Segnature is a deeply ingrained custom in Italian culture. Because of the tradition's secrecy and the paucity of written sources, it is challenging to pinpoint its exact beginnings. But according to historical accounts and ethnographic studies, Segnature developed as a robust cultural practice of protection and healing by fusing Catholic ritual elements with pre-Christian indigenous beliefs.

The continuance of healing rites and magic in Southern Italy during the 20th century has been documented by scholars like Ernesto De Martino, who emphasised how these practices persisted both within and beyond the prevalent Catholic framework. The use of ceremonial gestures and words of power to influence illness and bad luck is another way that Carlo Ginzburg's research on rural healing techniques demonstrates similarities with shamanic aspects that speak to Segnature.

Historically, practitioners known by different regional names—such as Janare in Campania, Masca and Mascun in Piedmont, or Maggiara in Sicily—carried out ritual gestures and incantations very similar to Segnature.

Throughout Italian history, Segnature practitioners navigated complex relations with the Catholic Church in Italy and medical authorities. While the Church often viewed such folk practices with suspicion, many Segnatori integrated Christian symbolism—such as invoking the Holy Trinity or saints—into their rituals to align with prevailing religious norms and avoid persecution.

At the same time, they provided indispensable healing services in areas where formal medicine was inaccessible or distrusted. The secrecy and social marginalisation surrounding Segnature limited its public visibility, but the practice persisted across Italian regions with strong local variations. The late 20th and early 21st centuries have witnessed a renewed interest and wider dissemination of Segnature, especially through social media networks, where practitioners share knowledge beyond traditional geographical and familial boundaries.

In recent ethnographic research, Segnature has been increasingly recognized not merely as folk magic but as a form of indigenous Italian shamanism, reflecting a spiritual worldview grounded in animism, ancestral wisdom, and a close relationship with the natural and supernatural worlds.

== Regions ==
Southern Italy: the Janare and Campania Practitioners of Segnature-like folk healing are frequently referred to as Janare in Campania and southern Italy. The tradition has older pagan roots, possibly deriving from the Latin Ianua (door) or Dianara (follower of the goddess Diana). Stories of Sabbath gatherings in Benevento, a place famed as the "city of witches," describe healers smearing ointments on their bodies to "fly" and meet beneath a walnut tree. Local accounts suggest these women were midwives and healers, not malevolent witches. The Janare are known for secretive, family-passed prayers and signs used to cure illness and protect against malocchio.

The north of Italy: the Masca/Mascun and Piedmont Region In the Piedmont region, folk healers are called Masca (women) and Mascun (men). These figures also blend Christian symbols with older, pre-Christian elements. Their practices remain embedded in local dialects and cultural identities.

Sardinia: brebus and related traditions In Sardinia, a related tradition known as brebus (or li paruli) focuses on the power of sacred words. Prayers are recited in local dialects to invoke saints or ancestral spirits. Healers known as Abrebadoras (female) and Abrebadoris (male) pass these prayers down secretly. Like Segnature on the mainland, Sardinian traditions rely on gestures, hidden knowledge, and healing intent.

== Other regions and modern developments ==
Across Italy, Segnature-like practices continue under different names and local traditions. In Sicily, the term Maggiara may be used. These practices often involve a mix of Catholic and pre-Christian elements, with regional variations in emphasis.

Social media has transformed how Segnature is transmitted and practised. Online groups help standardise knowledge, facilitate learning, and form new communities. Older practitioners tend to preserve secretive, Catholic-rooted customs, while younger ones often adopt eclectic, open, and syncretic approaches, sometimes integrating Pagan and New Age elements.

== Summary ==
Despite linguistic and cultural variation, Segnature across Italy shares core components: hand gestures, sacred phrases, and prayers that aim to heal, protect, and influence natural forces. These practices reflect a layered heritage of pre-Christian, Catholic, and vernacular traditions that continue to evolve within the modern cultural landscape.

== Rituals and practices ==
Segnature rituals involve drawing sacred signs (often crosses) over body parts or objects while reciting prayers. These are typically passed down within families during secret initiations, especially at midnight on Christmas Eve.

The practice treats a range of ailments—herpes zoster (fuoco domestico), burns, sprains, headaches, parasites, and more. Some rituals are even aimed at controlling weather or removing the evil eye. Modern adaptations include remote healing via photographs sent over messaging platforms.

Intent and spiritual purity are considered essential. Segnatori distinguish their work from ritual magic or talismans, describing their actions as blessings rooted in divine or ancestral energy.

Ritual language often includes invocations to Christian figures like Jesus, Mary, or patron saints. However, a growing number of younger practitioners blend this with Pagan or alternative spirituality. Healing acts often occur in kitchens—spaces associated with feminine knowledge and sacred domesticity.

== Relationship with Catholicism and folk religion ==
Segnature exemplifies Italian folk Catholicism—a syncretic spirituality where formal Catholicism merges with older folk beliefs. Healers integrate Christian symbols into practices that may have pre-Christian roots.

The institutional Church has historically viewed Segnature with suspicion, sometimes labelling it superstition. Nevertheless, community respect and perceived effectiveness have preserved its legitimacy. Younger practitioners increasingly reinterpret Segnature within contemporary spiritual frameworks, but many still honour its Catholic roots.

== Contemporary usage and revival ==
In the 21st century, Segnature has gained visibility through online media. Social networks allow practitioners across Italy and the diaspora to exchange rituals, advice, and prayers. The revival reflects broader interest in traditional healing, ancestral wisdom, and spiritual pluralism.

Dr Angela Puca significantly contributed to academic recognition of Segnature through her doctoral research, Indigenous and Trans-cultural Shamanism in Italy, which positions the practice within a framework of contemporary and indigenous shamanism.
