= Dummy, the Witch of Sible Hedingham =

British witch

Dummy the Witch of Sible Hedingham
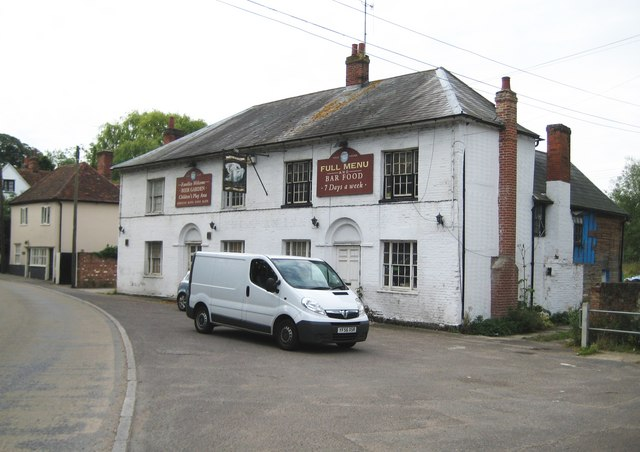
- The tavern from where Dummy was accosted by a mob
- Born: c. 1788; Possibly France
- Died: 4 September 1863 (aged 74–75); Halstead, Essex, United Kingdom of Great Britain and Ireland
- Occupation: Fortune teller

Dummy, the Witch of Sible Hedingham (c. 1788 – 4 September 1863) was the pseudonym of an unidentified elderly man who was one of the last people to be accused of witchcraft in England in the 19th century. He died after being lynched by a mob of witch-hunters.

== Background ==
A longtime resident of Sible Hedingham, Essex, a small farming village in the English countryside, he was a deaf-mute who earned a living as a local fortune teller.

== Accusations ==
In September 1863, Dummy was accused by Emma Smith from Ridgewell of 'cursing' her with a disease, and dragged from The Swan tavern by a drunken mob. He was ordered to 'lift the curse'. When Dummy did not, he was thrown into a nearby brook as an "ordeal by water". He was also severely beaten with sticks before eventually being taken to a workhouse in Halstead where he died of pneumonia.

== Aftermath ==
Following an investigation by authorities, Emma Smith and Samuel Stammers, who was a master carpenter and also friends with Smith, were charged with having "unlawfully assaulted an old Frenchman commonly called Dummy, thereby causing his death". (The idea that Dummy was French was common in the village, but there seemed to be little evidence of whether it was true.) They were tried at the Chelmsford Assizes, where on 8 March 1864 they were sentenced to six months' hard labour.

== See also ==
- Krystyna Ceynowa
- Anna Klemens
- Witch trials in the early modern period
- Barbara Zdunk
