= Anne Pedersdater Kasteføll =

Danish woman accused of witchcraft

- Died: 1636; Ystad, Scania, Denmark–Norway, present-day Sweden

Anne Pedersdater Kasteføll (died 1636 in Ystad), was a Danish woman who was executed for witchcraft in the city of Ystad in Scania (now a Swedish province, Scania was a Danish province until 1658). Her case is one of the most known in Danish Scania outside of Malmö.

For a few years, Anne had peddled little bags with cloves of garlic, nails and strands of hair in exchange for happiness, good fortune and good health and a coin or two. She was very poor and would sometimes knock at people's doors and ask for a place to sleep and she would offer them a lucky charm if they said yes. This went on for about ten years prior to her execution.

Mette, wife of Simon, reported that her neighbours had said that Anne Pedersdatter had thrown something in front of their front door on Saint Canute's Day the year before and that Mette's little daughter had walked out the door right afterwards. Almost immediately, the little girl fell ill and remained in bed until three weeks after Easter. On the same day that the girl took to her bed, Anne had come to their home two or three times to ask how the girl was, although she didn't really know the family. Several similar accusations were brought against her from Ystad. It also turned out she had already been sentenced to exile for witchcraft in the city of Lund in 1624 but she had defied the verdict. To make it even worse, she was found to have several illegitimate children.

On 16 November 1636, the Scanian County Court (Skaanninge landsting) issued the verdict that she should burn at the stake for being a 'throldquinde'.
