= Angela Puca =

Italian scholar of religion

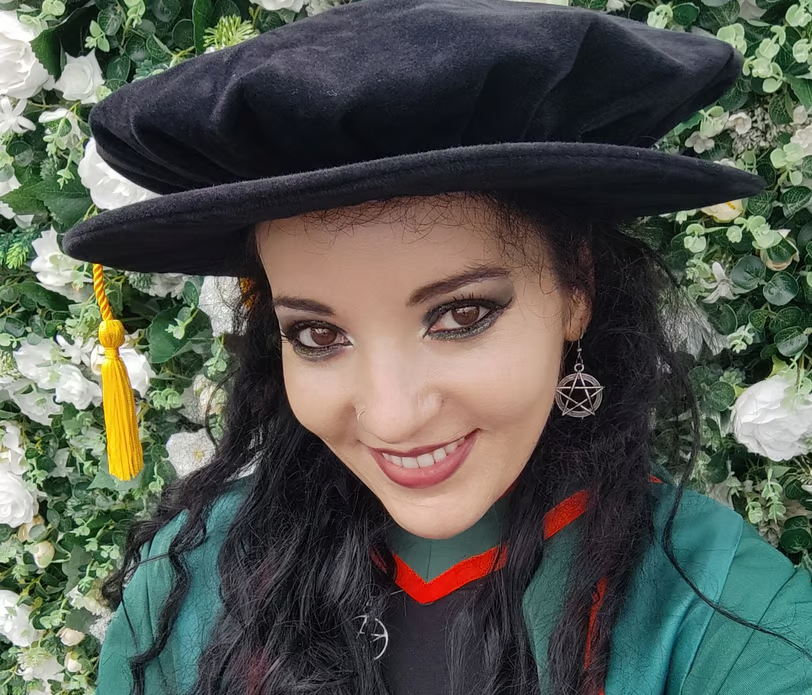
- Puca in 2021
- Born: Naples, Italy
- Occupations: Academic, Lecturer, Author, YouTuber
- Employer: Leeds Trinity University
- Known for: Research on segnature, witchcraft, paganism, shamanism; Angela's Symposium (YouTube)

Academic background
- Education: University of Naples "L'Orientale" (BA, MA); University of Leeds (PhD)

Academic work
- Discipline: Religious studies
- Sub-discipline: Magic; witchcraft; paganism; esotericism; shamanism
- Notable works: Italian Witchcraft and Shamanism (2024); La Tradizione delle Segnature (2021)
- Website: drangelapuca.com

Angela Puca is an Italian academic and scholar of religion whose work specialises in magic, witchcraft, paganism, esotericism and shamanism. Since 2016, she has lectured at Leeds Trinity University in the Department of Philosophy and Religious Studies. Puca is also a public-facing scholar, known for hosting the YouTube channel Angela's Symposium, which aims to make academic scholarship on esotericism accessible to a broader audience.

== Early life and education ==
Puca was born in Naples, Italy. She completed her bachelor's and master's degrees in philosophy at the University of Naples "L'Orientale", where she focused on Eastern philosophies and religions, particularly Buddhism, and Indian Religion in Tibet. Her training included extensive language studies in Latin, Ancient Greek, Sanskrit, and both Classical and Modern Tibetan.

She later moved to England to pursue a doctoral research at the University of Leeds, earning her PhD in 2021 in the Anthropology of religion. Her thesis, titled Indigenous and Transcultural Shamanism in Italy, was supervised by Dr Suzanne Owen and Professor Graham Roberts and published by Brill Publishers.

== Academic career ==
Puca joined the faculty at Leeds Trinity University in 2016. Her teaching and research focus on the intersection of religion, magic, and identity, especially in contemporary Western contexts. She has published widely in academic journals and edited volumes, including contributions to the Journal of the British Association for the Study of Religion, International Journal for the Study of New Religions and Fieldwork in Religion.

She is co-editor of the volume Pagan Religions in Five Minutes (Equinox) and contributor to the Critical Dictionary of Apocalyptic and Millenarian Movements.

== Research interests ==
Puca's research explores:

- Magic and witchcraft in historical and contemporary contexts
- Indigenous and trans-cultural shamanic practices, particularly in Italy
- Contemporary Paganism and esotericism
- Vernacular and folk healing traditions (e.g., segnature)
- The role of discourse and social media in constructing religious identities

Her fieldwork in Italy has focused on the often-hidden practices of folk healers, known as segnatori or segnatrici, and how such traditions interact with broader currents of esotericism and modern spirituality.

== Public engagement ==
In 2019, Puca founded Angela's Symposium, a social media project whose main platform is YouTube, dedicated to the academic study of esotericism, witchcraft, paganism and shamanism. The channel features interviews, lectures and critical analyses, aiming to bridge the gap between academic research and practitioner communities.

She has appeared in various podcasts, conferences and interviews and is noted for her efforts to increase public understanding of esoteric traditions through accessible and scholarly content.

== Selected publications ==
=== Books ===
- Italian Witchcraft and Shamanism: The Tradition of Segnature, Indigenous and Trans-cultural Shamanic Traditions in Italy (Brill, 2024)
- Pagan Religions in Five Minutes (co-editor, Equinox)

=== Articles and chapters ===
- "Magic as a Contested Concept in the Study of Religion", in Contested Concepts in the Study of Religion (2023)
- "The Impact of Social Media on Italian Shamanism and Folk Magic", Journal of the British Association for the Study of Religion (2020)
- "Can There Be Shamanism in the Western World?", Journal of the International Society for Academic Research on Shamanism (2022)
- "Scientism and Post-Truth: Two Contradictory Paradigms Underlying Contemporary Shamanism", JBASR (2018)
- "Witch and Shaman: Discourse Analysis of the Use of Indigenizing Terms in Italy", International Journal for the Study of New Religions (2018)
- "The Tradition of Segnature: Underground Indigenous Practices in Italy", Journal of the Irish Society for the Academic Study of Religions (2019) These are available, for free, on her Academia.edu page leedstrinity.academia.edu/AngelaPuca.
- La Tradizione delle Segnature. Magia popolare e guaritori (non più) di campagna (2021)

== See also ==
- Shamanism
- Contemporary paganism
- Esotericism
- Witchcraft
- Magic in the Greco-Roman world
