= Anna Klemens =

Alleged Danish witch

- Born: 1718
- Died: 1800 (aged 81–82); Brigsted, Horsens, Denmark–Norway
- Cause of death: Lynched
- Known for: Victim of last witch lynching in Denmark

Anna Klemens (1718–1800) was a Danish murder victim and an alleged witch. She was lynched in 1800 after being accused of sorcery in Brigsted at Horsens in Denmark–Norway, a lynching considered to be the last witch lynching in her country and, most likely, in all Scandinavia.

Long after the legal courts in Denmark stopped executing witches after the execution of Anne Palles and Johan Pistorius, the belief led to private trials and lynching of alleged witches during the 18th century. In the countryside in Øster Grønning in Salling in 1722, the villagers apprehended a woman, Dorte Jensdatter, whom they suspected of having caused several deaths and problems in the village by magic and held a private witch trial. When they were convinced, they tied her up in her own home and burned the house down with her in it. Several of the villagers were later sentenced to death for her murder.

Klemens' was the last of these lynch cases.

== See also ==
- Dummy, the Witch of Sible Hedingham
- Krystyna Ceynowa
- Barbara Zdunk
