= Dorte Jensdatter =

Danish murder victim (1672–1722)

- Born: 1672
- Died: 1722 (aged 49–50)
- Cause of death: Burnt by neighbours

Dorte Jensdatter (1672–1722), was a Danish woman burned alive by her neighbors after being accused of witchcraft.

Dorte Jensdatter was unmarried and supported herself by spinning in the village of Øster Grønning in Salling. She was suspected of having made two children as well as cattle sick by use of magic. After the death of a horse in 1722, the suspicions turned to open accusations. The owner of the dead horse and the mother of one of the dead children apprehended Jensdatter and arranged a private witch trial with the help of her neighbors. They judged her guilty of witchcraft and sentenced her to death. They tied her to a chair in her home and killed her by setting fire to her house. The woman who had accused her lit the fire. The murder was followed by wide publicity, and two accusers were arrested for her murder and executed. The last lynching for witchcraft in Denmark was the case of Anna Klemens in 1800.

== See also ==
- Dummy, the Witch of Sible Hedingham, similar case in Great Britain.
- Krystyna Ceynowa, similar case in Poland.
