= Ingeborg i Mjärhult =

Swedish natural healer, natural philosopher, soothsayer and spiritual visionary

Ingeborg i Mjärhult ('Ingeborg of Mjärhult') (1665 – 23 July 1749) was a Swedish natural healer, natural philosopher, soothsayer and spiritual visionary.

== Life ==
Ingeborg i Mjärhult belonged to the peasantry of the parish of Virestad in Kronoberg County in Småland. She was born to the farmer Daniel i Uthövdan, and married the farmer Måns Gudmundsson i Mjärhult (d. 1716), with whom she had four children. By marriage, she was customarily called "i Mjärhult", which referred to the farm of her spouse.

Early on, she became active as a natural folk healer. By the time she became a widow in 1716, she had achieved national fame. Her medical activity included a type of religious natural philosophy, which she also shared with the public. Reportedly, she adjusted herself to follow all the church duties the law demanded and was in fact described as quite devout. She was on several occasions questioned by the church and the authorities for superstition, but she always defended herself by stating that she had not harmed anyone, was given great support by the public and enjoyed great popularity. In 1740, the bishop of Växjö questioned her, warned her for superstition and advised the public not to seek her help. Ingeborg responded that she only used bandages prepared with herbs plucked at midsummer moon as she had learned from her mother, and that she did not harm anyone. The public ignored the bishop's order. In fact, the harassment from the church only increased her good reputation.

During her last years, she lived in the cottage of her son Måns Månsson, where she died in 1749, at the age of 84.

=== Activity ===
Her view was that the nature spirits of folklore were in fact the fallen angels of Lucifer. She taught that humans consisted of two beings; the human above the earth, who walked with her feet above the earth, and the human of the underworld. These two beings walked adjoining each other, with the soles of their feet against each other, above and below the surface of the earth. She had been inspired to this belief by seeing animals looking down upon their reflection on the surface of the lakes. When someone became ill, she claimed, it was because the underworld part of that person, the antipode, had collided with some of the spirits of the earth.

It was said that she could tell what sickness a person had, simply by handling a piece of that person's clothing. She then revealed exactly what spirit the sick person had disturbed and recommended that he or she apologize and offer milk to the spirit, to a stone or something similar. She specialized in epilepsy. She was very popular and her reputation spread throughout the country.

In 1741, Carl von Linné, who regarded Ingeborg i Mjärhult to be more efficient than many educated doctor, described and her activity, and reported that she was:

...sought from all over the nation and had a more famed name than many a doctor, who studied and practiced all his life. Her theory and practice were as follows: She believed that the entourage of Lucifer had been cast out unto the earth, were some had been given their dwelling in the water and were known as necks, under houses with the name of tomtegubbar, in plants and trees such as fairies, in forests such as Rå. She believed every human had their spirit, who followed them as the shadow followed the body, and that this spirit walks underneath the surface of the earth, as man walks above, so that the feet of the spirit were continuously turned toward the feet of the human, a faith to which she had come to believe after seeing animals, forests and mountains, beside a lake, reflect in the surface of the water. She believed, that human and their spirit were connected such, that when the human over earth were suffering, so did the human under earth, and the other way around, when the human under earth were wounded, so was the human over earth a part. She believed that when people walked and their antipodes under earth happen to disturb the home of an vätt, elf, rå or similar creature below the earth, the human below earth would be wounded, and the human above would subsequently suffer thereby [...] when someone was ill, the patient need not be seen by her, nor did she need to ask their constitution, temperament, pulse, symptoms or diet, but it was enough if she was shown their sock, garter, linen or any textile worn by the patient, by which she could diagnose the illness and recommend a cure. Her pathologie or judgement were often, that the patient had slept in some place, or took from a tree, that was occupied by some spirit, or that the patient had been given the illness by air, water, fire or earth o. s. v. Her cure were: the patient should leave the house on three mornings in silence and fasting, or three Thursday evenings, normally toward north, or to a tree or a plant, beg for forgiveness or sacrifice milk or similar.

== See also ==
- Brita Biörn
- Brigitta Lars Anderssons

== Sources ==
- Signum Svenska kulturhistoria Stormaktstiden
- http://www.virestad.nu/Hembygdsforening/Bygdehistoria/sagobygden.htm%5B%5D
- Wilhelmina Stålberg: Anteckningar om svenska qvinnor (Notes on Swedish women)
- Historiskt-geografiskt och statistiskt lexikon öfver Sverige / Andra Bandet. C-F
- Carl von Linné: Nemesis Divina
