= Doruchów witch trial =

1775 witch trial in Poland

Coordinates: 51°25′N 18°05′E

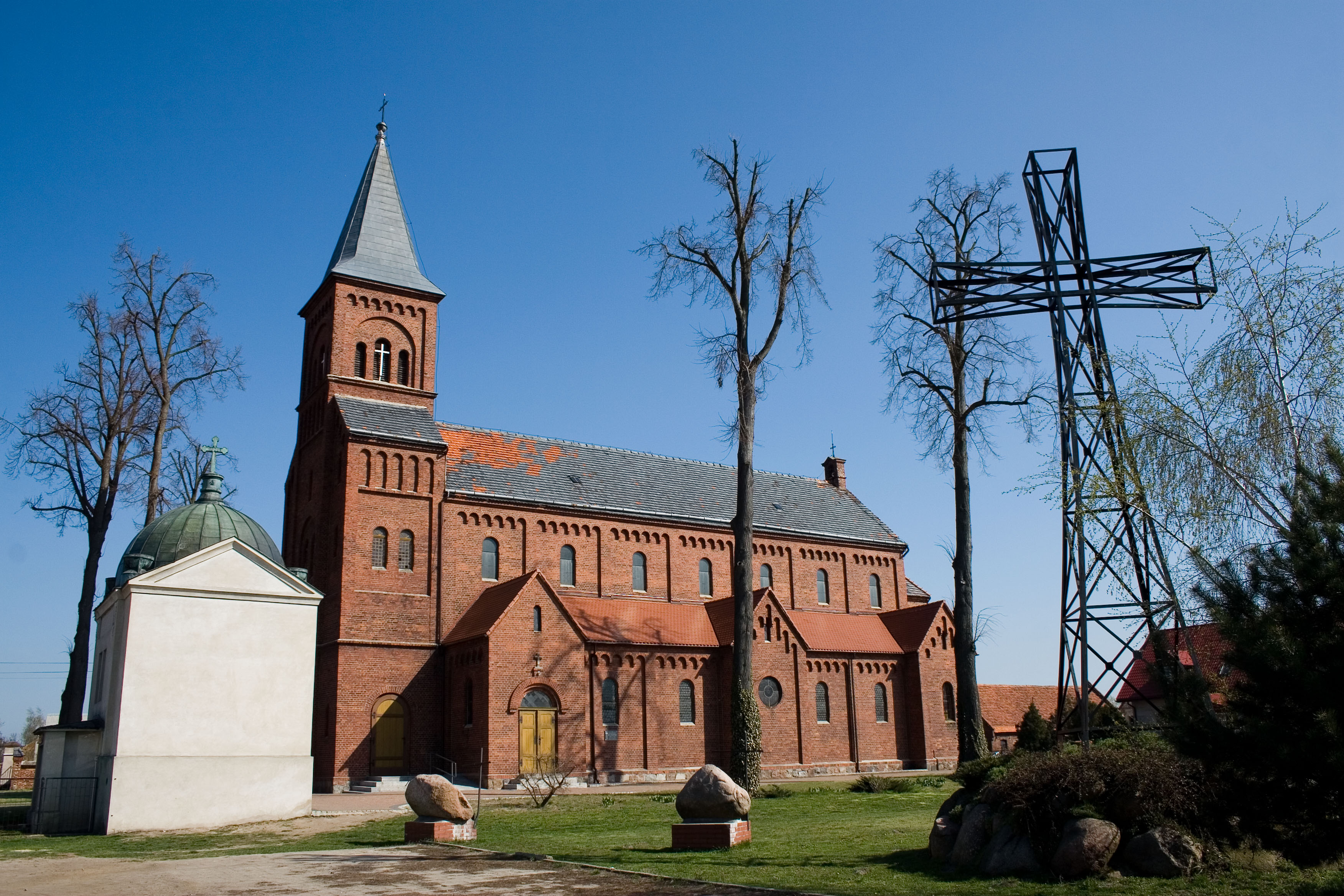
The Doruchów church, contemporary with the witch trial.

The Doruchów witch trial was a witch trial which took place in the village of Doruchów in Poland in the 18th century. It was the last mass trial of sorcery and witchcraft in the Polish–Lithuanian Commonwealth.

The trial allegedly resulted in the execution of 14 women in 1775, and led to the ban on witch burning in Poland. However, a reassessment of the original documentation places the trial in 1783, with 6 victims, and having no effect on any of the laws concerning witch burning.

== History ==
According to the older historians who believed the first version of the event, in 1775, the inhabitants in the village of Doruchów asked for the authorities in the nearby city of Grabów nad Prosną to halt the investigation of sorcery, which had been initiated in the village. Previously, in 1768, the Polish Sejm (Parliament) had banned local magistrates from handling witchcraft cases; so, the trial was conducted by the court of Grabów, which judged 14 people guilty of witchcraft and sentenced them to death. This trial allegedly led to the Polish government to ban torture and witch trials in 1776.

Still according to that version, the reason for the accusations and trial was the illness of a local nobleman's wife. Women from the village were accused of having caused the noblewoman's sickness by use of magic. Fourteen women were said to have been arrested, of whom three supposedly died of the torture and eleven were burned at the stake.

Modern Polish historians – such as Janusz Tazbir – have, however, questioned whether the Doruchów witch trial really took place in 1775, whether it happened as described, and whether it had the claimed effect on the law. Tazbir points out that the most detailed account of this event was given by early-19th-century writer Konstanty Majeranowski, who has been found by later historians to have authored several historical hoaxes. Tazbir notes that the existing primary sources can prove that only six – not fourteen – women, were sentenced to death, and it is not even clear whether they were actually executed. Further, the documents examined by Tazbir indicate that the trial took place not in 1775, but later, in 1783 or shortly before – in any case, after 1776, because it has been recorded that the judges who conducted this trial were punished for pronouncing the sentence, in defiance of the law abolishing witch trials, which had been issued in that year. Therefore, the trial could not have influenced in any way the 1776 Sejm legislation that led to the ban on torture and witch trials, because it occurred when that law was already in force. There is no trace of such a trial in the rich collection of documents of the Polish Sejm or in the contemporary press in 1776.

In 1793, however, another – certainly the last – witch trial took place in independent Poland. During the second partition of Poland that year, a local judge in the city of Poznań cited the partitions and transition from Polish to Prussian authority as a basis for the voiding of Polish laws banning trial and executions of witches. With that justification, he accepted the accusation of two women with inflamed eyes, who were said to have enchanted their neighbor's cattle. They were judged guilty of witchcraft and burned. In 1811 Barbara Zdunk was executed, but it is dubious as to whether the trial should be regarded as a witch trial or not.

== See also ==
- Witch trials in Poland
