= Witchcraft in Italy =

Evidence of magic use and witch trials were prevalent in the Early Modern period, and Inquisitorial prosecution of witches and magic users in Italy during this period was widely documented. Primary sources unearthed from Vatican and city archives offer insights into this phenomenon, and notable Early Modern microhistorians such as Guido Ruggiero, Maria Sofia Messana, Angelo Buttice and Carlo Ginzburg (among others), have defined their careers detailing this topic. In addition, Giovanni Romeo's monograph Inquisitori, esorcisti e streghe nell'Italia della Controriforma (1990) was considered pioneering and marked an important step forward in inquisitorial and witchcraft studies dealing with early modern Italy.In last 25 years a jurist and researcher on trials against witches, add many informations: the names of people involved in witchcraft, their jobs, the meetings. Monia Montechiarini in 'Stregoneria: Crimine Femminile', 'Streghe, eretici e benandanti del Friuli Venezia Giulia' and 'Streghe, Avvelenatrici e Cortigiane di Roma' discovered new secrets.

== Benandanti ==
The existence of the Benandanti, an agrarian fertility cult, was first documented by microhistorian Carlo Ginzburg in The Night Battles. The male Benandanti believed that four times a year (on “Ember days”) they would fall into a trance and ride off "in spirit," astride hares, cats, and other animals, doing battle against evil witches and warlocks. Armed with branches of fennel, their goal was to protect the fertility of their crops and their communities. Female Benandanti, by contrast, rode off to participate in the processions of the dead and to serve as intermediaries between their fellow villagers and the deceased ancestors of their neighbors and friends. "The Female Benandanti during the trials" writes Montechiarini, "affirmed their innocence and to fight on the right side".

Despite the repeated efforts of the Benandanti to convince their ecclesiastical judges not only of their innocence but also of their own efforts to impede, as good Christians, the malevolent actions of witches, inquisitors could not help but superimpose their own interpretation on the cult. In the eyes of the Franciscan fathers who investigated these beliefs, the benandanti, with their accounts of night-flying, metamorphosis into animals and secret gatherings, fit only too easily into the learned stereotype of witches. Particularly the image of the witches' sabbath as it had been elaborated and codified in demonological treatises and inquisitorial manuals over the course of the previous three centuries would gradually, under the suggestive pressure of the trials held against them, cause the benandanti to eventually define themselves as witches, assimilating the learned stereotype as their own.

The fame of The Night Battles has long preceded its translation. For many years, historians of witchcraft and popular culture have cited, discussed, criticized, and, most of all, admired this book, which first appeared under the title of I Benandanti (Turin, 1966). Ginzburg has also won recognition throughout the world for his subsequent historical work, most notably for his exploration of the intellectual world of the sixteenth-century Friulian miller Menocchio in The Cheese and the Worms.

On March 21, 1575, the vicario generale and the Inquisitor of the provinces of Aquilea and Concordia were first notified that in certain villages there were wizards calling themselves “Benandanti” who were declaring their intent to fight evil sorcerery. The investigations of these first Benandanti revealed the following facts:

- They met in secret, at night, four times yearly (only on Ember Days);
- They reached their meeting place by riding on hares, cats, or other animals;
- The assembly did not present any of the well-known "satanic" traits of the witch covens (there was no abjuration of the faith, no vituperation of the sacraments or the cross, no homage to the devil).

The Benandanti, provided with fennel branches, would fight the sorcerers (strighe and stregoni) who were armed with broomlike reeds. The benandanti claimed that they opposed witches' evil deeds and that they cured the victims of their spells. If they were victorious in the combat of the four ember weeks, then the crops of the year would be abundant. If defeated, they would experience scarcity and famine.

Further investigations brought to light some details concerning the recruitment of the Benandanti and the pattern of their nocturnal assemblies. According to them, they were requested to join the company by an "angel from heaven" and were initiated into the secret group when they were between twenty and twenty-eight years old. The company was organized in military fashion under a captain, and the company gathered together when they heard the captain beating a drum. Members were bound to secrecy. At meetings sometimes as many as 5,000 Benandanti would be present, with some members local to the region, though most would travel from distant provinces.

They had a flag of white gilded ermine, while the sorcerers' flag was yellow with four devils depicted on it. All Benandanti were born "with the shirt," that is, enveloped in a caul. When the Inquisition following their stereotyped model of the Sabbath asked if the "angel" promised them delicious courses, women, and other salacious entertainments, the defendants proudly denied such insinuations.

== Segnature ==
Recent scholarship has highlighted the continuity of vernacular healing practices in Italy, particularly the tradition known as Segnature, a form of ritual blessing or gesture-based healing often performed by rural practitioners known as segnatori or segnatrici. Dr Angela Puca, a scholar of religion and expert in Italian folk magic, has conducted extensive ethnographic fieldwork on these practices. In her 2024 monograph, Italian Witchcraft and Shamanism, Puca argues that Segnature represents a living indigenous form of magic that has endured through syncretism with Catholicism and is now undergoing a process of revival and systematisation, partly influenced by social media and modern spiritual frameworks.

== Love Magic ==
The Catholic Church often accused many types of women of performing magic in order to “bind” the passions of their clients, neighbors, friends, or even family. Binding Passions: Tales of Magic, Marriage, and Power at the End of the Renaissance by Guido Ruggiero offers many examples of “prostitution, concubinage, love magic, renegade clerics, a social hierarchy that largely overlooked the victimization of lower-class women, and a vision of sex as fitting within a passive- active dialectic that easily slid into violence.”

In Binding Passions, the following magic related stories are told:

- Venetian Courtesan Andriana Savorgnan marries a Venetian nobleman named Marco Dandolo. This socially unequal marriage, uncharacteristic of the time, drew significant attention of not only Dandolo’s incredulous family, but also the attention of the Roman Inquisition. The Catholic Church would claim that Andriana Savorgnan, as a mere prostitute, had to rely on magic spells to coerce Dandolo into loving her.
- Elena Cumano and Gian Battista Faceno: When Faceno leaves for Flanders, unceremoniously leaving Cumano with-child and broken-hearted, Cumano resorts to using the love magic of a martello to summon him to return and to bind them together. When this fails, the church officials, doubting that Elena Cumano learned this magic from the very same man she was trying to perform it upon, instead began to inquire about one of Elena’s neighbors, a middle aged woman named Lucretia. Although eventually cleared of any wrongdoing, Lucretia’s public reputation as an eccentric, as well as her involvement in the romantic lives of others naturally branded her a witch
- A Venetian Courtesan named Paolina di Rossi and Paolina’s love interest, Gian Battista Giustinian. Paolina di Rossi attempts to seduce Giustinian using a variety of methods ranging from bean throwing, to written incantations, to animal sacrifice. Naturally, these actions sparked a Holy Office inquiry, and the records of inquisitorial discussions with di Rossi were left in the Venetian Archives.
- A Priest from Latisana named Apollonia Madizza. Apollonia was questioned by the Holy Office about three specific types of magic: “love magic, magic used to find lost things, and magic used to heal.” The magic being described was considered “minor,” but for those being unbound by Madizza it was life changing- for example she discussed ways to unbind those who were unable to have intercourse with their wives.
- A renegade priest and friar named Fra Aurelio di Siena who was involved mainly with fortune telling. di Siena also had the dubious honor of being declared a “notorious heretic ” by the Roman Inquisition due to his gambling, lying, and his side business of fortune telling. Di Siena utilized chiromancy (palm reading), astrology, and geomancy ( divination using figures or lines), it appears that finally the Church took action against his “magical activity.” He was sent to jail, and one can only ascertain that he remained there until his death.

== See also ==
- Aradia
- Aradia, or the Gospel of the Witches
- Bacchanalia
- Benandanti
- Cimaruta
- Cult of Diana
- Dionysian mysteries
- Donas de fuera
- Carlo Ginzburg
- Italian cunning folk
- Madonna Oriente
- Malocchio
- Mano cornuta
- Menocchio
- Roman Inquisition
- Guido Ruggiero
- Stregheria
- Tarantella
- Tarantism
- Val Camonica witch trials
- Vatican Secret Archives
- Witch trials in Italy
- Witch trial of Nogaredo
- Witches of Benevento
