= Witch trials in Italy =

Witch trials in the historic Italian states took place between the 14th and 18th centuries. Witch trials were carried out by the Roman Inquisition as well as secular courts. Estimates of the number of executions has varied, and range from hundreds to thousands of victims.

Northern Italy had many witch trials in the 15th century, peaking during the Italian Renaissance and the Italian Wars. After the 1530s, executions declined. A second wave came between 1580 and 1660. The Inquisition played major role, but often prioritised heresy over witchcraft and showing leniency. Witch trials gradually decreased after the 17th century, with the last executions occurring in Piedmont (1723) and Venice (1724).

== History ==
=== Intensity ===
Northern Italy experienced its first wave of witch trials earlier than most of Europe, reaching its peak during the Italian Renaissance. After a high-profile case in Milan in 1384, there were a number of witch trials in Italy during the 15th-century. Mass witch trials with executions took place in Cuneo in 1477, Pavia in 1479, Valtellina in 1460, 1483 and 1485, in Canavese 1472 and 1475–76, in Peveragno in 1485 and 1489, and in Carignano in 1493–94. Italian witch trials reached their peak during the Italian Wars (1494–1559). After the 1530s, witchcraft executions in Italy decreased, and for several decades, lesser punishments than the death penalty became common in Italian witch trials.

The Italian states experienced a second wave of witchcraft executions during the Counter-Reformation, and reached their peak between circa 1580 and 1660, before they finally decreased.

=== Witch trials of the Inquisition ===
Normally, the Inquisition only conducted witch trials at the request of the local authorities and public. The Inquisition conducted some of the biggest witch trials in Italy, namely the Val Camonica witch trials of 1518-1521 and the Sondrino witch trials of 1523. Usually, the Inquisition respected normal legal practices and the legal rights of the accused more than secular courts when conducting witch trials, and the Inquisition is known to have revoked sentences made by a secular court in witchcraft cases when the rights of the accused had been violated in the eyes of contemporary law.

The Inquisition did not consider witchcraft a priority compared to heresy, particularly after the introduction of the Counter-Reformation. It maintained the policy that the Witches' Sabbath was an illusion caused by Satan rather than real, and did not accept a charge of witchcraft based solely on the testimony of an already charged person. As in the case of heresy, people who were condemned guilty of witchcraft by the Inquisition, and repented, were not executed the first time they were condemned, only if they relapsed and repeated the crime, which also contrasted with the secular courts.

=== Secular witch trials ===
Most witch trials in Italy were conducted by local secular courts and not by the Inquisition. The Italian states experienced a second wave of witchcraft executions during the Counter-Reformation, and reached their peak between circa 1580 and 1660, before they finally decreased. During the second Italian witch hunt of 1580–1660, the majority of witch trials were conducted by local secular courts, rather than the Inquisition. During the second wave, the largest mass witch trials were at Val di Fassa in 1573, 1627–31 and 1643–1644; the Val di Non in 1611–1615, Turin in 1619, Nogaredo in 1640-1647, and Valtellina in the 1670s.

Secular courts continued to conduct witch trials until the 18th-century, though the intensity lessened from the second half of the 17th-century and executions as the result of witch trials became fewer. The last witchcraft executions by secular courts in Northern Italy took place in Piedmont in 1723 and in Venice in 1724.

== See also ==
- Witchcraft in Italy
- Witch trials in Sicily
- Witch trials in the early modern period
