= Brusino =

Brusino may refer to:

- Brusino Arsizio, municipality in the district of Lugano in the canton of Ticino in Switzerland
- Brusino, Bulgaria, village in the municipality of Ivaylovgrad, in Haskovo Province, in southern Bulgaria
- Brusino, frazione of Cavedine in Trentino in Italy
