= Castle of Castellano =

Manor house in Trentino, Italy

Coordinates: 45.92116°N 11.00632°E

- Castellano
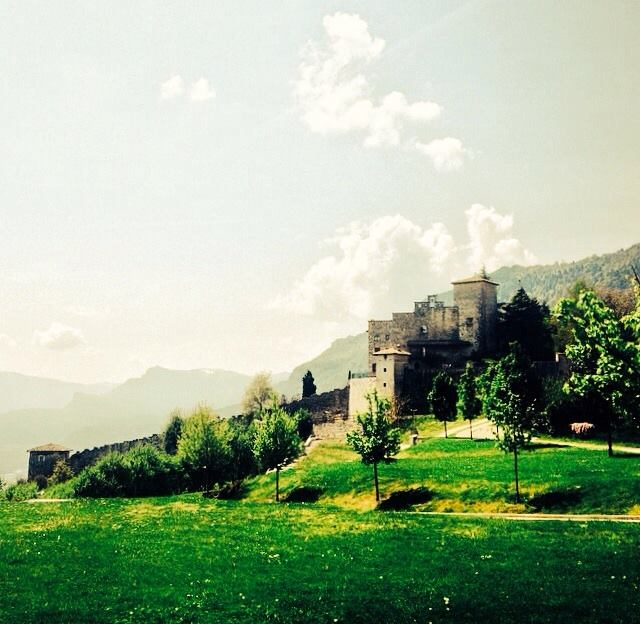
- Castle of Castellano

Site information
- Open to the public: by appointment only

Site history
- Built: 12th century

Garrison information
- Current commander: Miorandi family

The Castle of Castellano (Italian: Castello di Castellano, German: Schloss Kastellein) is a manor house in the village of Castellano, in the municipality of Villa Lagarina, in Trentino, northern Italy.

It is one of the most famous castles of Vallagarina, offering a panorama of the entire valley, and was used to protect roads leading to Lago di Cei.

Constructed in the 12th century, the castle was conquered by the Castelbarco family in the mid-13th century, before being acquired by the counts of Lodron in 1456. It was formerly Trento's episcopal headquarters. In World War I, it was transformed into an Austrian-Hungarian fortress.

The castle is currently owned by the Miorandi family, and hosts Castelfolk, an annual summertime musical and culinary festival. It once housed frescoes, now preserved in the Rovereto's civic museum.
