= Lake Cavedine =

Lake in Trentino, Italy

Lago di Cavedine
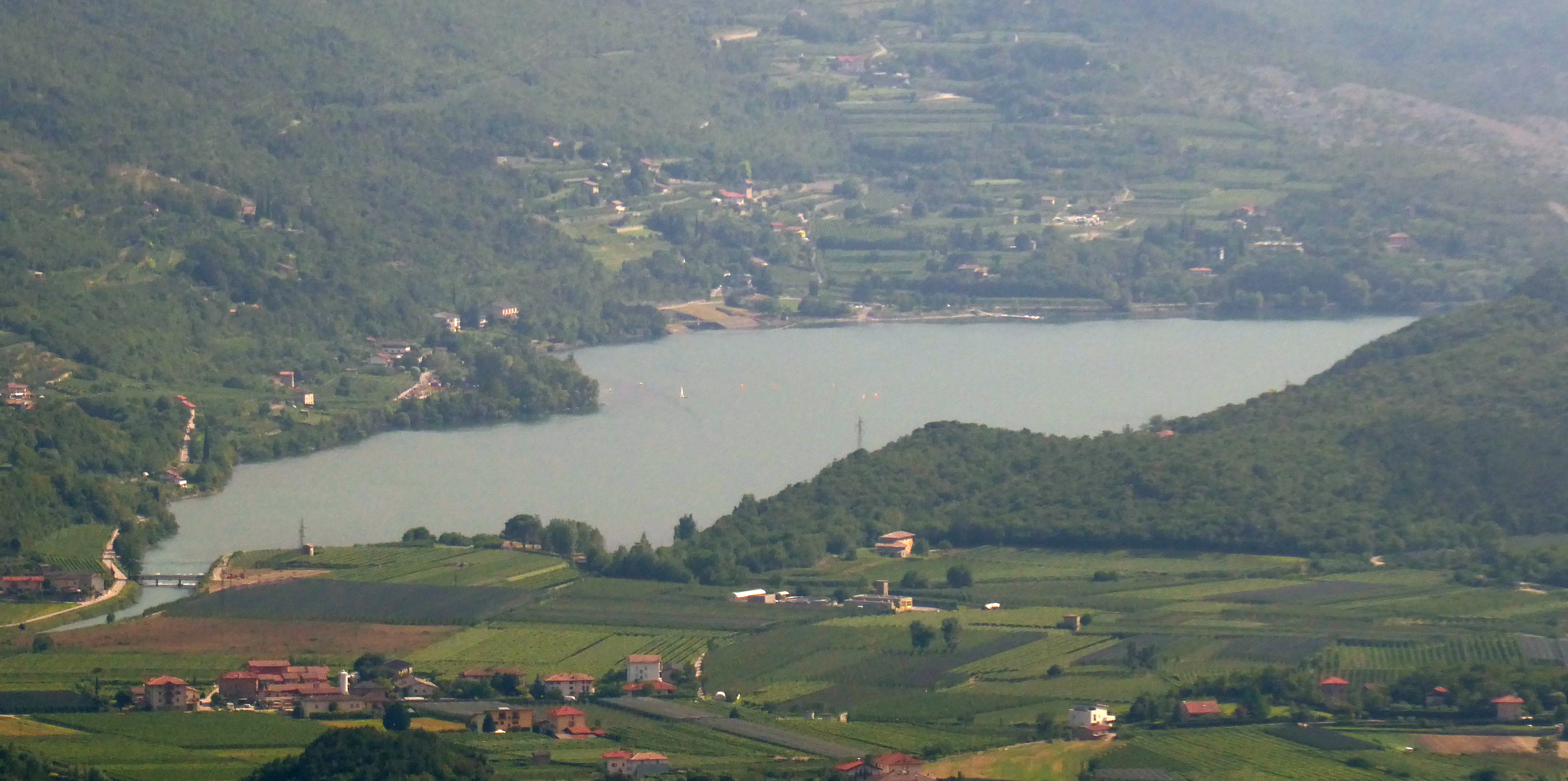
- The Lago di Cavedine seen from the SP18 provincial road leading to Ranzo
- Interactive map of Lago di Cavedine
- Location: Cavedine; Dro, Province of Trento, Trentino-Alto Adige, Italy
- Coordinates: 46°00′36″N 10°58′48″E
- Primary inflows: Rimone

The Lago di Cavedine is a lake located in the Valle dei Laghi, in the Province of Trento. The basin is part of the lake system that feeds the hydroelectric plant of Torbole. The lake's surface lies almost entirely within the municipality of Cavedine, except for some stretches of the western shore and the southwestern extension, which are in the municipality of Dro.

== History ==
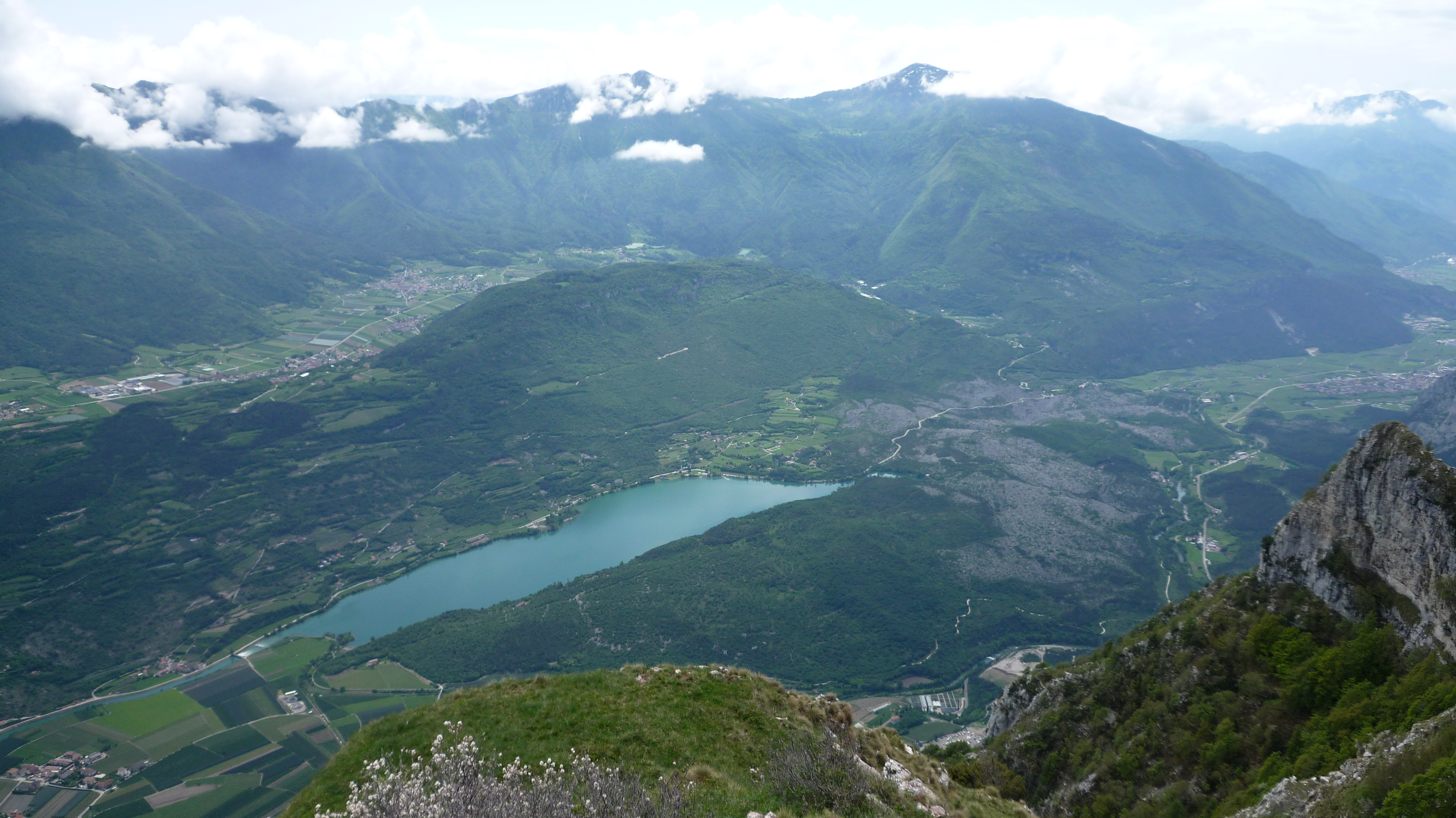
The lake, the Marocche di Dro, and, on the left, the inhabited centers of the municipality of Cavedine, seen from Monte Casale

The lake was formed by a dam in the 1st century AD, following a landslide detached from the Monte Brento and Monte Casale, which heavily altered the Sarca plain, creating, among other things, the Marocche di Dro. The lake has an artificial inflow, the Rimone, which connects it to the basins of Toblino and Lake Santa Massenza

== Environment ==
The lake's waters are clear and do not freeze; within it, various fish species are found, including burbot, carp, chub, whitefish, pike, perch, nase, rudd, tench, and lake trout. Among the avifauna frequenting the lake, notable species include the swan, mallard, coot, and grey heron

== Tourism ==
The lake is swimmable, although the hydroelectric exploitation considerably cools its water, and various sports are practiced there, including windsurf, kayak, and sailing, thanks also to the presence of the Ora del Garda.; the lake is also frequented for fishing. While the eastern shores are traversed by pedestrian and cycling paths, the western shores have been kept wilder

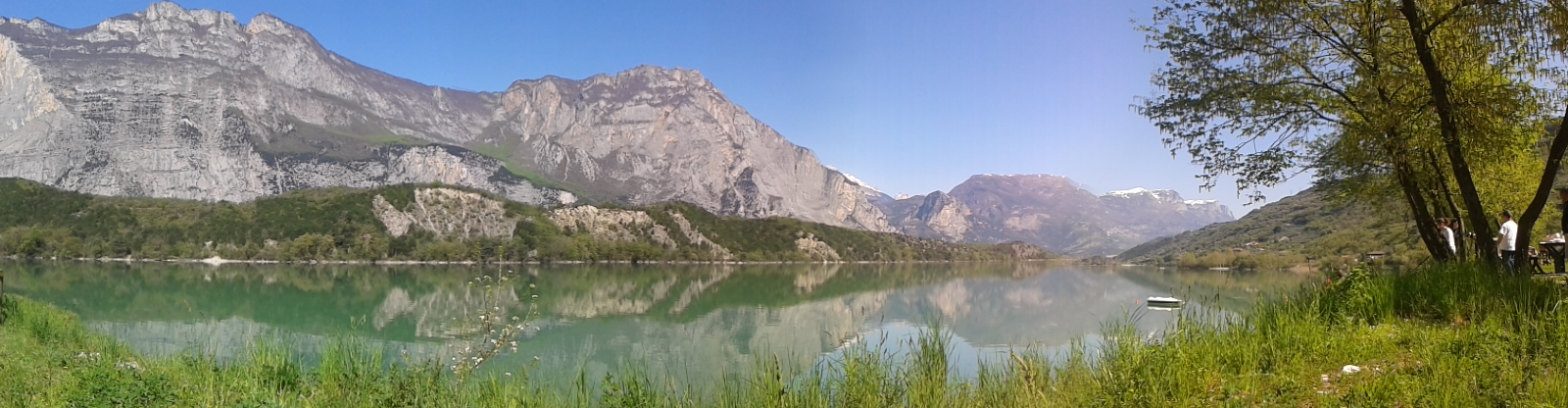
Panorama of the lake
