= Drena =

- Comune
- Comune di Drena
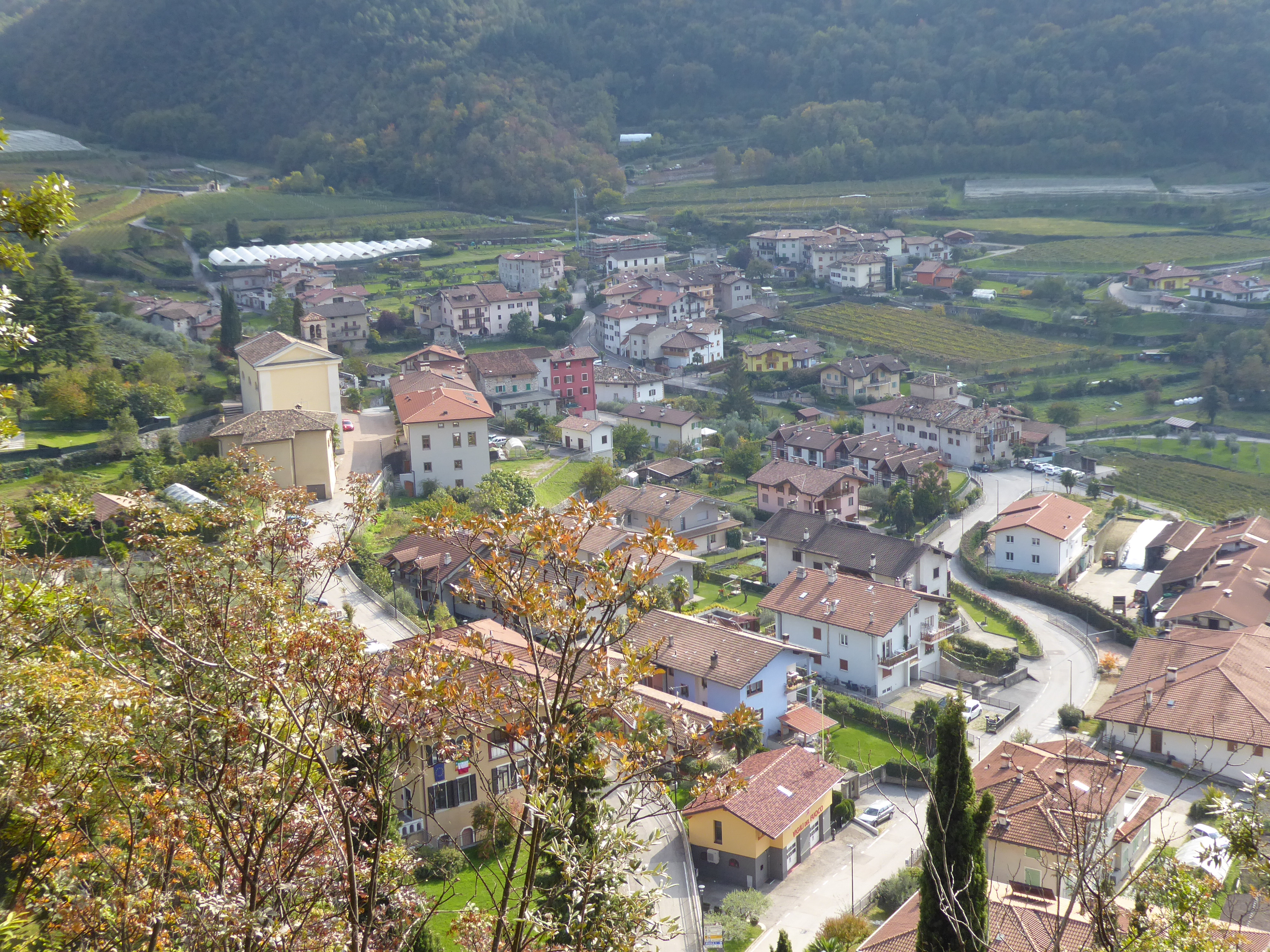

- Location within Italy Location within Trentino-Alto Adige/Südtirol
- Coordinates: 45°58′N 10°57′E
- Country: Italy
- Region: Trentino-Alto Adige/Südtirol
- Province: Trentino (TN)

Government
  - Mayor: Giovanna Chiarani

Area
  - Total: 8.4 km^{2} (3.2 sq mi)

Population (2026)
  - Total: 609
  - Density: 73/km^{2} (190/sq mi)
- Time zone: UTC+1 (CET)
  - Summer (DST): UTC+2 (CEST)
- Postal code: 38074
- Dialing code: 0464
- Website: Official website

Drena (Dréna in local dialect) is a comune (municipality) in Trentino in the northern Italian region Trentino-Alto Adige/Südtirol, located about 15 kilometres (9 mi) southwest of Trento. As of 31 December 2004, it had a population of 476 and an area of 8.4 square kilometres (3.2 mi^{2}).

Drena borders the following municipalities: Dro, Cavedine, Arco and Villa Lagarina.

== Demographic evolution ==
Historical population

Year	Pop.	±%
1861	?	—
1871	?	—
1881	?	—
1901	?	—
1911	?	—

Year	Pop.	±%
1921	664	—
1931	557	−16.1%
1936	534	−4.1%
1951	521	−2.4%
1961	504	−3.3%

Year	Pop.	±%
1971	390	−22.6%
1981	387	−0.8%
1991	424	+9.6%
2001	454	+7.1%

Source: Data from ISTAT
