= Pomponio Algerio =

Italian religious martyr

- Born: 1531; Nola
- Died: 19 August 1556 (aged 24–25); Piazza Navona, Rome
- Cause of death: Death by boiling

Pomponio Algerio (1531 – 19 August 1556) was an Italian student who was executed for his Lutheran beliefs.

== Biography ==
Algerio was born in Nola, and was a civil law student at the University of Padua, where his Lutheran theological beliefs attracted the attention of the Roman Inquisition. At his trial, he wore his academic hat and gown to remind the tribunal that, as a student, he had the right to freely express his ideas. From the transcript of Pomponio Algerio at his trial:

"I say that the Church deviates from the truth in so far as it says that a man could do anything in any way good on his own, since nothing praiseworthy can proceed from our corrupt infected nature except to the extent that the lord God gives us his grace... the Roman Catholic Church is a particular Church and no Christian should restrict himself to any particular Church. This Church deviates in many things from truth."

After refusing to conform to Church doctrine, he was sentenced to prison and commanded to reconsider his Lutheran beliefs. After a year behind bars, he still refused to reconsider. Because Venetian authorities would not consent to an execution, Pope Paul IV sent officials to extradite Pomponio to Rome. In Rome, on 21 August 1555, a monk from the brotherhood of St John the Beheaded visited Pomponio in his cell urging him to repent. If he repented, he would be strangled before burning. The 24-year-old student refused.

One year later, on 19 August 1556, he was executed by civil authorities in the Piazza Navona, Rome. Maintaining his composure while he was boiled in oil, he stayed alive for 15 minutes before dying.

== Awards and honours ==
On 28 February 2008, the University of Padua organized the first conference in memory of the execution of Pomponio Algerio, and affixed a commemorative plaque in the atrium of its "Cortile Nuovo" ("New Courtyard") in memory of the sacrifice made by its student in the name of religious freedom.
