= Marzadro Distillery =

Italian distillery

- Company type: S.p.a.
- Industry: Alcoholic beverages
- Founded: 1949
- Founder: Sabina and Attilio Marzadro
- Headquarters: Nogaredo, Trentino Italy
- Key people: Marzadro Family
- Products: Grappa
- Website: www.marzadro.it

The Marzadro Distillery is an Italian family run company created at the end of World War II. Its birth and evolution follows closely the economic transformation of Italy and the modernization of its means of production, in particular in the Northern part of the country. The company is located in the historical region for the production of grappa. Together with other distilleries in the regions of Trentino, Veneto, Friuli, Piemonte and Lombardia has made important contributions that have changed the character of this liquor from an ammazzacaffè to a liquor worthy of international recognition. Initially, the distillery operated only locally, distilling pomace to produce grappa and other liquor. Currently it benefits from a national and international network of distribution.

== History ==
- Beginning of the twentieth century. The Family Marzadro operated mainly in the agricultural sector. Due to significant losses in agriculture during World War II, a drop estimated at 25% compared to 1938 throughout Italy, the family business shifts towards the more profitable agro-industrial sector.
- 1949 Sabina starts the distillation of grappa using 2 direct fire batch dilators while her younger brother Attilio, is charged with sales. The initiative taken by Sabina reflects the change in status and employment of women in Italy following World War II.
- 1968 Transfer into new offices in Brancolino. The distillery operates six water bath stills increasing production to about 100,000 bottles annually.
- 1978 Control of the distillery passes to the second generation of the family consisting of the four heirs: Elena, Erino, Stefano and Andrea Marzadro.
- 1980 Production increases with the addition a continuous distillation setup to a daily processing capacity of 20 tons of pomace. The company adds 3 employees with a turnover of 300 million pounds a year. Start in this decade, the market crisis of brandy due to factors of poor quality, market restrictions confined to areas in the Alps (Piedmont, Friuli, Trentino Alto Adige, Veneto and Lombardy), high consumption of homemade brandy and preference Cognac, Brandy and Whisky on the domestic market. Introduction of new products or alcohol brandy blueberry, peach, strawberry, raspberry and started production of souvenir bottles and bottles decorated by hand to cater to tourists.
- From 1984 to 1994 the company increases its revenue to around 800 million liras (400 thousand euros) yearly.
- 1985 Introduction of varietal grappas and fruit liquors such as apple and pear.
- 1995 Acquisition of a new building for use as warehouse, automatic bottling equipment and new administrative offices. The number of employees increases to 40 with a turnover reaching 13 billion liras (6.5 million euros) per year.
- 1999 Innovative project to produce grappa stravecchia aged 18 months in barrels of four different types of woods: oak, acacia, ash and cherry.

2004 Construction of a new building designed by the architects Günther Plaickner and Walter Maurmayr. Made of stone, wood and glass, its architecture reflects the philosophy of the distillery blending into the landscape of the region and reminding of the castles that dot the Lagarina Valley. This becomes the new home of Marzadro Distilleriy in Nogaredo.

== Offices and awards ==
- Stephen Marzadro, Vice President, Institute for Protection of Trentino Grappa.
- IWSC - International Wine & Spirit Competition: 5 awards.
- ISW - Internationaler Spirituosen Wettbewerb: 5 awards.
- Interregional Competition Alembicco del Garda: 13 awards.
- National Competition Grappa: 3 awards.
- Competition Selection Brandy Gold: 4 awards.

== Educational Visits ==
The distillery offers tours to groups spoken in German, Italian, English and French. From September to November it is possible to see the distillery in operation.
