= Madonna Oriente =

Madonna Oriente or Signora Horiente ("Lady of the East"), also known as La Signora del Gioco ("The Lady of the Game"), was a religious figure with magical powers. Accounts of her existence mainly come from two Italian women who, after testifying to participating in rites with the Madonna, were executed by the Inquisition in 1390 as part of the Italian witch trials.

== Description ==
The description of Madonna Oriente mainly comes from the testimonies from two Milanese women, Sibillia Zanni and Pierina de' Bugatis, in their accounts before the Inquisition.

Sibillia confessed in 1384 that she joined a "society" led by a woman named Oriente each Thursday evening and paid homage to her. At the meetings they consumed every kind of animal except the donkey, which was excluded because of its association with Jesus, as he had been carried by one into Egypt and later in triumph into Jerusalem. Another explanation is that the donkey is considered sacred to Satan. Oriente then resurrected the consumed animals, a ritual that alludes to the pagan tradition of the wild hunt. In 1390, Sibillia claimed that what they did during the meetings was no sin, but that they also didn't dare speak God's name in fear of offending Oriente.

Pierina's accounts are similar, but give more details influenced by witch stereotypes. Both living and dead people attended the meetings, but hanged and decapitated people were excluded from the meetings since they couldn't make a bow of reverence to Oriente. Oriente's society would also roam through wealthy people's houses where they would eat and drink, after which Oriente would bless them. Oriente also taught the virtues of herbs, remedies to cure diseases, how to find stolen goods and how to dissolve spells. However, Oriente warned the followers to conduct these practices in secret in fear of persecution. Pierina also gave more details of Oriente's restorative powers—her followers would sometimes slaughter an ox, and after they had eaten it's meat, they would gather the bones and put them inside its skin, after which Oriente would strike the skin with her wand and resurrect the animal.

== Historical context ==
=== Association with other religious figures in Italy ===
Madonna Oriente came to be associated directly with beliefs about witches, and particularly associations with Diana and Herodias, as evidenced in Oriente's testimonies.

==== "The Society of Diana" ====
Diana is the only pagan goddess mentioned by name in the New Testament. In the Middle Ages, legends of nighttime processions of spirits led by a female figure are recorded in the church records of northern Italy, southern Germany, and the western Balkans. The spirits were said to enter houses and consume food which then miraculously reappeared. They would sing and dance, and dispense advice regarding healing herbs and the whereabouts of lost objects. If the house was in good order, they would bring fertility and plenty. If not, they would bring curses to the family. Some women reported participating in these processions while their bodies still lay in bed. Carlo Ginzburg has referred to these legendary spirit gatherings as "The Society of Diana".

==== Herodias ====
In medieval Europe, Herodias became associated with beliefs about witches, specifically as the supernatural leader they would join at night to ride with or visit in a "play" or other gathering. She thus became synonymous with figures who performed the same function, such as Diana, Holda, and Abundia.

=== Association with demonic worship ===
Local clergy complained that women believed they were following Diana or Herodias, riding out on appointed nights to join the processions or carry out instructions from the goddess. The earliest reports of these legends appear in the writings of Regino of Prüm in the year 899, followed by many additional reports and variants of the legend in documents by Ratherius and others. By 1310, the names of the goddess figures attached to the legend were sometimes combined as Herodiana. It is likely that the clergy of this time used the identification of the procession's leader as Diana or Herodias in order to fit an older folk belief into a Biblical framework, as both are featured and demonized in the New Testament. Herodias was often conflated with her daughter Salome in legend, who, upon being presented with the severed head of John the Baptist was blown into the air by wind from the saint's mouth, after which she continued to wander for eternity. Diana was often conflated with Hecate, a goddess associated with the spirits of the dead and with witchcraft. These associations, and the fact that both figures are attested to in the Bible, made them a natural fit for the leader of the ghostly procession. Clergy used this identification to assert that the spirits were evil, and that the women who followed them were inspired by demons.

The witch trials in Italy during the late 14th and early 15th centuries were still mostly restrained, and allegations of diabolism were rare and vague. Richard Kieckhefer argues that the testimonies of Madonna Oriente don't fit the stereotypes of contemporary demonology. Instead, they lie somewhere between Christianity and pre-Christian pagan rituals surviving in the Italian countryside, since Sibillia Zanni and Pierina de' Bugatis considered themselves Christian. However, in an age when notions of diabolism were becoming important, the Inquisition applied a sinister interpretation of these activities and thus condemned them as sinful. On the contrary, Carlo Ginzburg argued that, just as the Inquisitors understood it, there was an obvious kinship between Oriente and the likes of Diana, Holda, etc. Furthermore, while both Sibillia and Pierina initially only gave accounts of Madonna Oriente, it is likely that Sibillia's first inquisitor had suggested identification with Diana during her first trial, and the second then attributed it to Pierina's case.

=== Wider European context ===
Accounts of Madonna Oriente share similarities with other superstitious groups and sects in Italy and greater Europe, such as the followers of Richella and "the wise Sibillia" in 15th-century northern Italy, the Benandanti of 16th- and 17th-century northern Italy, the Armiers of the Pyrenees, the Romanian Căluşari, Livonian werewolves, Dalmatian kresnici, Hungarian táltos and Caucasian burkudzauta.

== Testimony and trial ==
In the years 1384-1390, Sibillia Zanni and Pierina de' Bugatis were separately tried before the podestá, the secular court of Milan, and later referred to the Inquisition on the charge of heresy based on their accounts of Madonna Oriente. It is not known whether they knew each other.

They first appeared before the Inquisitors in 1384, when they were sentenced as heretics to various penances. They were tried again in 1390, during which Pierina claimed that she had joined the society at the age of sixteen, forced to take the place of her aunt, who would otherwise not be permitted to die. Whenever she wanted to attend a meeting, she called upon Lucifel, who would come to her in the shape of a man, instruct her, and bear her to the meetings. At the age of 30, she had signed a pact with the Devil using a spoonful of her blood.

In 1390, they were sentenced to death as recidivists and burned at the stake in Piazza Sant'Eustorgio, or in Piazza Vetra, depending on the accounts.

== See also ==
- Roman Inquisition
- witchcraft
- witch-hunt
