= Cavedine =

- Comune
- Comune di Cavedine
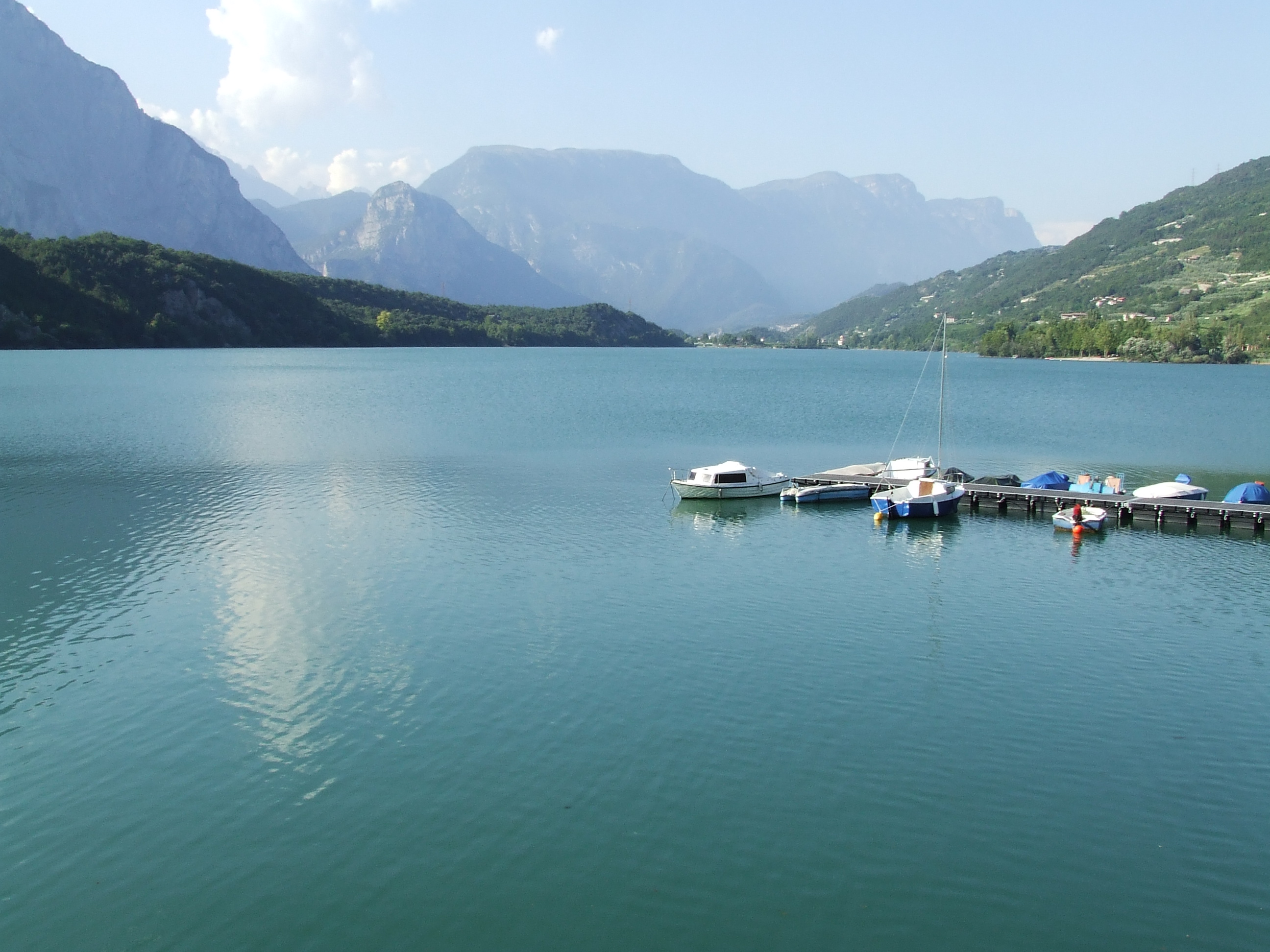
- Cavedine lake in Trentino

- Location within Italy Location within Trentino-Alto Adige/Südtirol
- Coordinates: 46°0′N 10°58′E
- Country: Italy
- Region: Trentino-Alto Adige/Südtirol
- Province: Trentino (TN)
- Frazioni: Brusino, Cavedine, Stravino, Vigo Cavedine and Lago di Cavedine

Government
  - Mayor: David Angeli

Area
  - Total: 38.3 km^{2} (14.8 sq mi)

Population (2026)
  - Total: 3,103
  - Density: 81.0/km^{2} (210/sq mi)
- Time zone: UTC+1 (CET)
  - Summer (DST): UTC+2 (CEST)
- Postal code: 38073
- Dialing code: 0461
- Website: Official website

Cavedine (Cavéden or Cavédem in local dialect) is a comune (municipality) in Trentino in the northern Italian region Trentino-Alto Adige/Südtirol, located about 14 kilometres (9 mi) southwest of Trento. As of 31 December 2004, it had a population of 2,799 and an area of 38.3 square kilometres (14.8 mi^{2}).

The municipality of Cavedine contains the frazioni (subdivisions, mainly villages and hamlets) Brusino, Cavedine, Stravino, Vigo Cavedine and Lago di Cavedine.

Cavedine borders the following municipalities: Trento, Lasino, Dro, Cimone, Villa Lagarina and Drena.

== Demographic evolution ==
Historical population

Year	Pop.	±%
1861	?	—
1871	?	—
1881	?	—
1901	?	—
1911	?	—

Year	Pop.	±%
1921	3,056	—
1931	2,627	−14.0%
1936	2,549	−3.0%
1951	2,551	+0.1%
1961	2,472	−3.1%

Year	Pop.	±%
1971	2,328	−5.8%
1981	2,385	+2.4%
1991	2,467	+3.4%
2001	2,730	+10.7%

Source: Data from ISTAT

== See also ==
- Lake Cavedine
