= Giovanni Romeo =

Italian historian

Giovanni Romeo (born 1949) is an Italian historian.

== Short biography ==
Romeo was born in Procida. He is a full professor of early modern history at the University of Naples, and a specialist in social and religious history.

His monograph Inquisitori, esorcisti e streghe nell'Italia della Controriforma (1990) was considered pioneering and marked an important step forward in inquisitorial and witchcraft studies.

The themes of history of Inquisition and sacramental confession have been developed in two small books of interpretative synthesis: Ricerche su confessione dei peccati e Inquisizione nell’Italia del Cinquecento (Naples, 1997) and L’Inquisizione nell’Italia moderna (Rome-Bari, 2002). Romeo focus on the ecclesiastical strategies of control of sexual behaviours in his large monographs Esorcisti, confessori e sessualità femminile nell’Italia della Controriforma (Florence 1999) and Amori proibiti. I concubini tra Chiesa e Inquisizione (Rome-Bari, 2008).

In his works dealing with the history of Inquisition and sacramental confession, he has strongly criticised the new leading historiographical trends in inquisitorial history represented especially by John Tedeschi (The prosecution of heresy: collected studies on the Inquisition in early modern Italy, New York 1991, Italian edition reviewed by Romeo in "Rivista di storia e letteratura religiosa" in 1999) and Adriano Prosperi (Tribunali della coscienza. Inquisitori, confessori, missionari, Turin 1996, reviewed in "Quaderni storici", again in 1999), focusing on their empirical and documental lacunas.

== Bibliography (selected) ==
- Inquisitori, esorcisti e streghe nell’Italia della Controriforma, RCS, Milan [Florence], 2004^{4} [1990]
- Aspettando il boia. Condannati a morte, confortatori e inquisitori nella Napoli della Controriforma, Sansoni, Florence, 1993
- Ricerche su confessione dei peccati e Inquisizione nell’Italia del Cinquecento, La Città del Sole, Naples, 1997
- Esorcisti, confessori e sessualità femminile nell’Italia della Controriforma, Le Lettere, Florence, 2009^{3} [1998]
- Review of A. Prosperi, Tribunali della coscienza. Inquisitori, confessori, missionari in Quaderni storici, 1999, 102, p. 796-800
- Review of J. Tedeschi, Il giudice e l’eretico. Studi sull’Inquisizione romana in Rivista di storia e letteratura religiosa, 1999, 35, p. 437-41
- "Giovanni Bellarmino tra Inquisizione e Indice" in Studi Storici, 2001, 42/2, p. 529-35
- L’Inquisizione nell’Italia moderna, Laterza, Rome-Bari, 2009^{4} [2002]
- "Confesseurs et inquisiteurs dans l’Italie moderne: un bilan", in Revue de l’histoire des religions, 2003, 220, p. 153-65
- Il fondo Sant’Ufficio dell’Archivio storico diocesano di Napoli. Inventario (1549–1647), monographical number of the historical review "Campania Sacra" (2003-34/1-2)
- Amori proibiti. I concubini tra Chiesa e Inquisizione, Laterza, Rome-Bari, 2008

== See also ==
- Roman Inquisition
- Witchcraft in Italy
