= Villa Lagarina =

- Comune
- Comune di Villa Lagarina
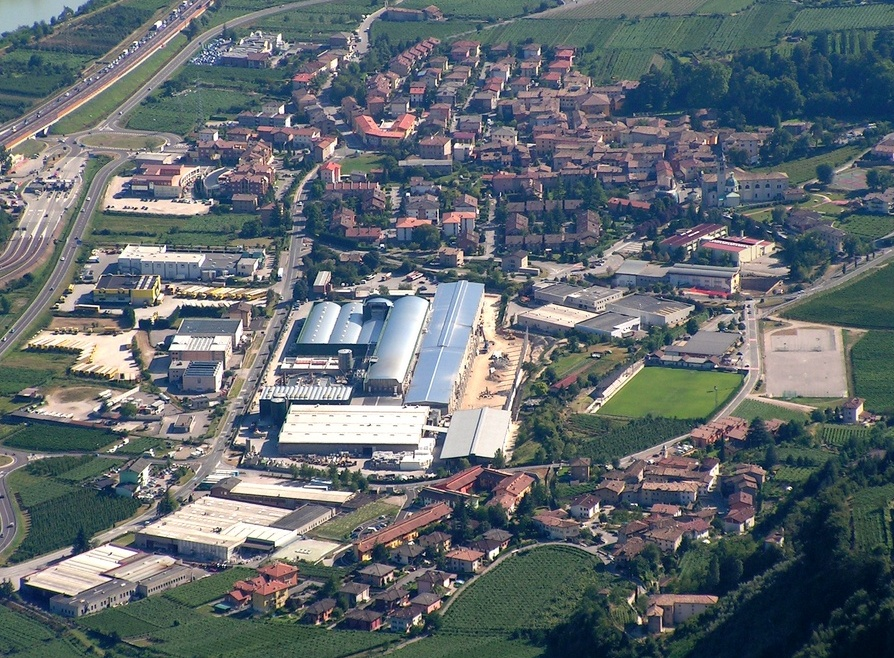

- Coat of arms

- Location within Italy Location within Trentino-Alto Adige/Südtirol
- Coordinates: 45°55′N 11°2′E
- Country: Italy
- Region: Trentino-Alto Adige/Südtirol
- Province: Trentino (TN)
- Frazioni: Castellano, Trentino, Pedersano, Piazzo, Lago di Cei

Government
  - Mayor: Julka Giordani

Area
  - Total: 24.1 km^{2} (9.3 sq mi)
- Elevation: 410 m (1,350 ft)

Population (31 December 2010)
  - Total: 3,684
  - Density: 153/km^{2} (396/sq mi)
- Demonym: Villani
- Time zone: UTC+1 (CET)
  - Summer (DST): UTC+2 (CEST)
- Postal code: 38060
- Dialing code: 0464
- Patron saint: Assumption of Mary
- Website: Official website

Villa Lagarina is a comune (municipality) in Trentino, northern Italy, located about 20 kilometres (12 mi) southwest of Trento.

Villa Lagarina borders the following municipalities: Cavedine, Cimone, Arco, Drena, Pomarolo, Ronzo-Chienis, Isera, Rovereto and Nogaredo. Sights include the Lago di Cei and the Castle of Castellano and also the Castle of Noarna (also known as New Castle)

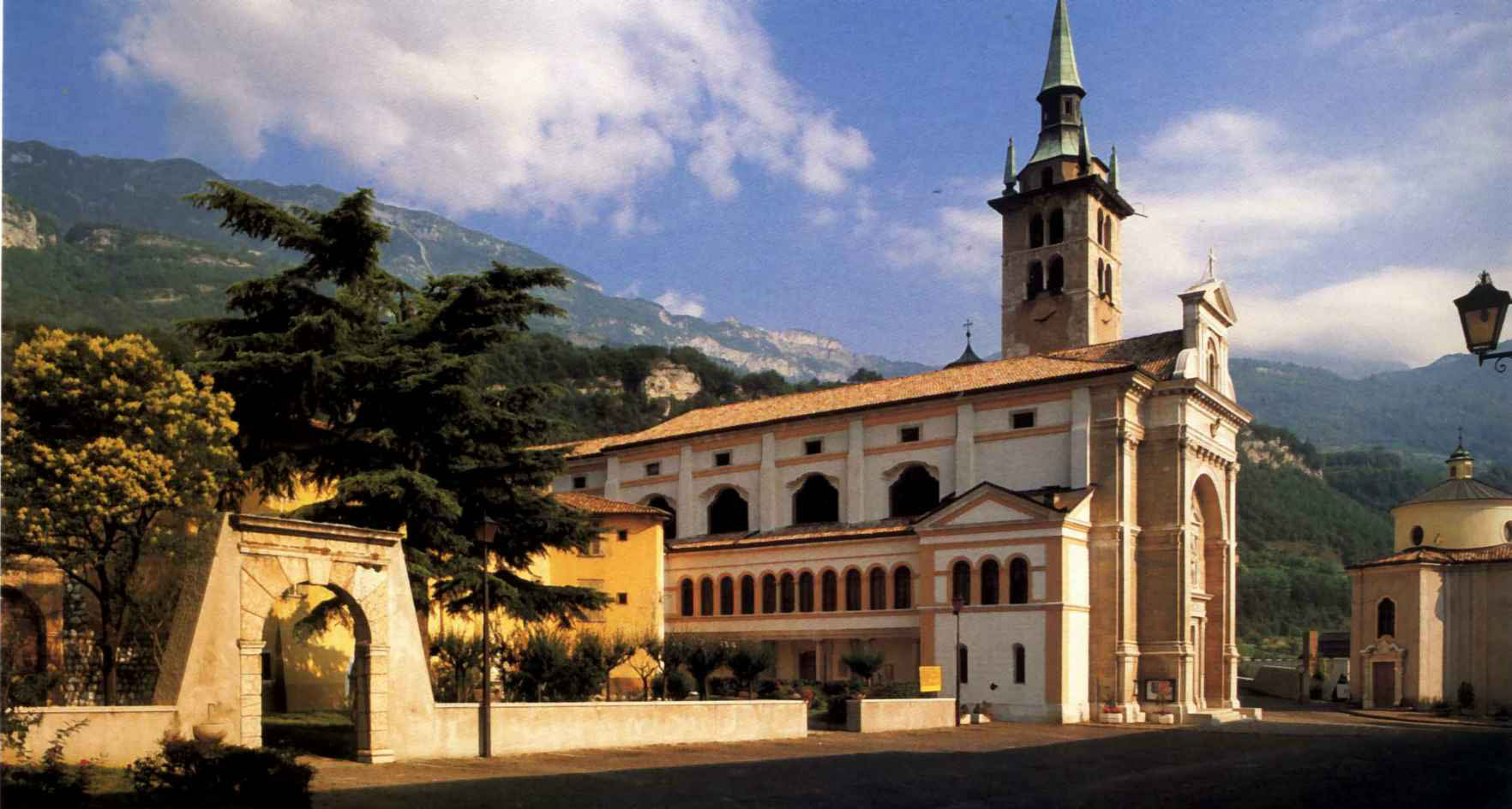
The church of Santa Maria Assunta

== Twin towns ==
- Bento Gonçalves, Brazil, since 2007
- Stockstadt am Rhein, Germany
- Colonia Manuel Gonzalez Mexico
