= Castellano, Trentino =

Castellano
- Frazione
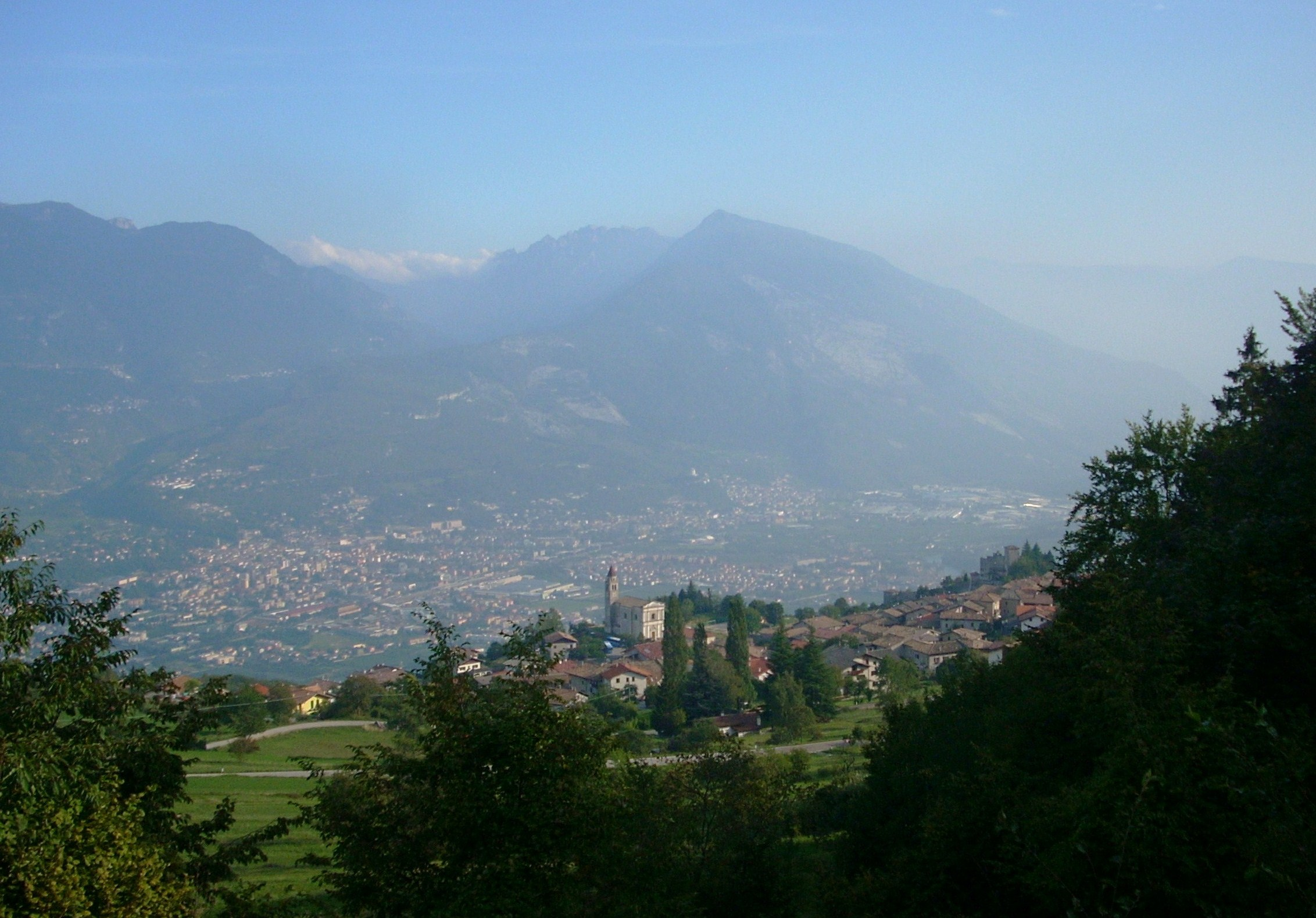

- Location of Castellano in Italy
- Coordinates: 45°55′0″N 11°2′0″E
- Country: Italy
- Region: Trentino-Alto Adige/Südtirol
- Province: Trentino (TN)
- Comune: di Castellano
- Elevation: 800 m (2,600 ft)

Population (Aug. 2009)
  - Total: 650
- Time zone: UTC+1 (CET)
  - Summer (DST): UTC+2 (CEST)
- Postal code: 38060
- Dialing code: 0464
- Website: Official website

Castellano (German: Kastellein) is a little village which is a frazione of the municipality of Villa Lagarina in Trentino. It was the most important village of the Feudo of Castellano and during the Austria-Hungary period was the site of the Comune di Castellano, abolished in 1929.

It is famous for its ancient castle (Castle of Castellano) which became very important under the Lodron and in World War I because it became an Austrian fortress.

Not far from there is a little Lake, Lago di Cei, which was very much loved by Elisabeth of Bavaria.

== Gallery ==
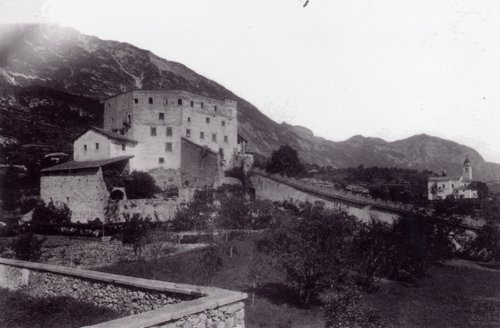
The Castle of Castellano (Early 1900)
