= Camilla Erculiani =

Italian apothecary (??–c.1584)

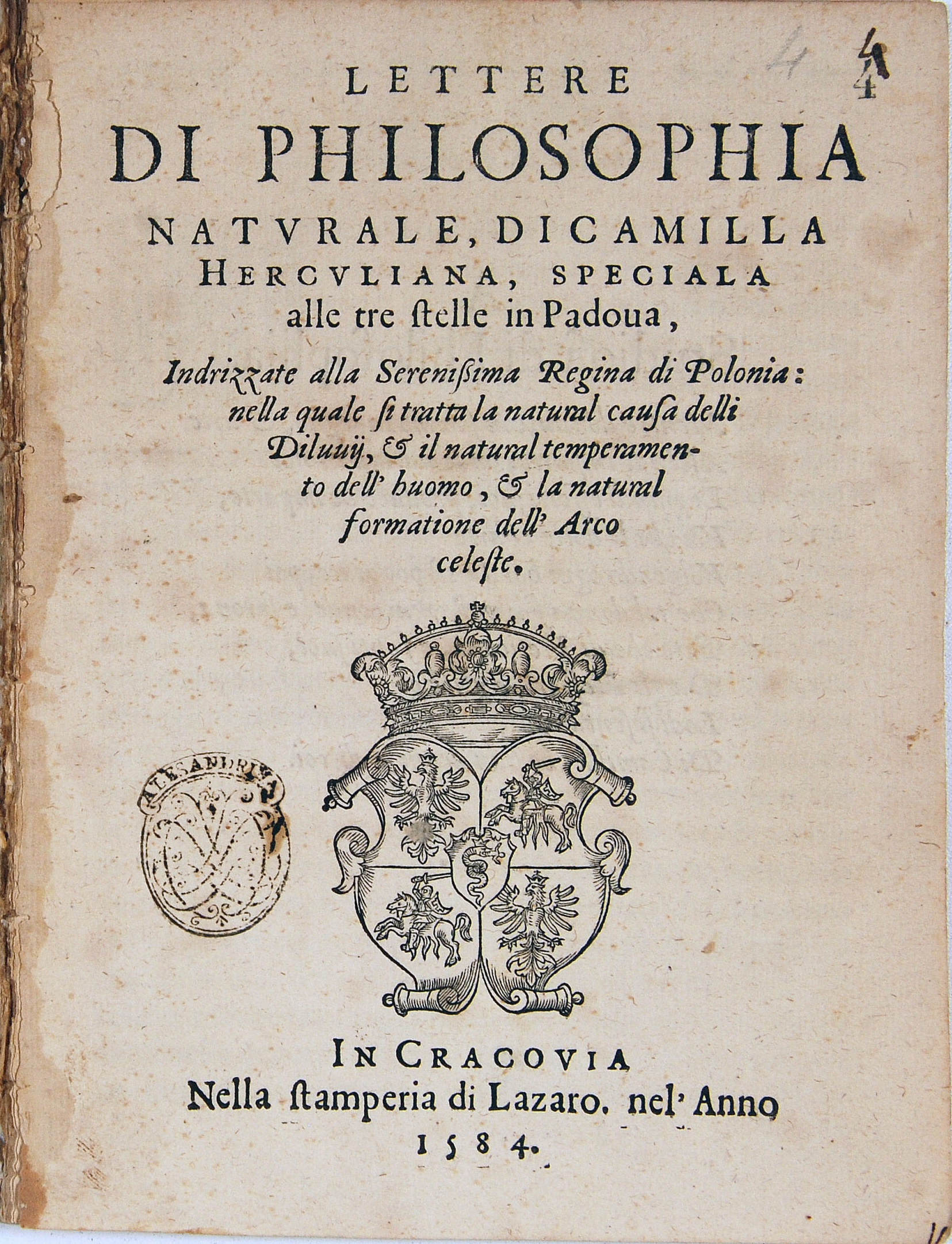
- Title page of Erculiani's 1584 treatise on natural philosophy
- Died: After 1584
- Other name: Camilla Herculiana
- Occupations: Apothecary, writer, activist
- Known for: Tried by the Roman Inquisition
- Spouse: Two (both apothecaries)
- Children: Six

Camilla Erculiani (also known as Camilla Herculiana; died after 1584) was an Italian apothecary, writer, natural philosopher, and a women's advocate during the early modern period. This "self-described pharmacist" published a book, in the form of letter-essays, about her views on topics of science and natural philosophy. Erculiani's Lettre di philosophia naturale or Letters on Natural Philosophy was published in 1584. Due to some of the unconventional theories presented in her work, she was put on trial by the Roman Inquisition on charges of suspected heresy—for the "blurring of boundaries between natural philosophy and theology." Although the trial records are lost, it is speculated that Erculiani was likely pardoned.

== Life ==
Many of the specifics of Erculiani's personal life are unknown. This female apothecary resided in Padua, in what is now Italy; a community that was particularly active in medical and scientific pursuits in the early modern era. In fact, Galileo taught at the University of Padua during this time. Moreover, Padua was one of the first locations that could boast a botanical garden in 1545.

Erculiani was the daughter of spice merchant Andrea Greghetti, a "fairly wealthy" man in society who owned multiple plots of land and houses. Erculiani was herself one of six children. She had two brothers—Andrea and Giorgio—and three sisters—Isabella, Lucrezia, and Pulisena. Erculiani was twice married and a mother of six children. Her first husband, Aloviso Stella, was the owner of an apothecary's shop called the Tre Stelle, which was located in the town of Sant'Andrea in Padua. Together, the couple had "at least one child, a son named Melchioree or Marchioro". Erculiani remarried after his death, which occurred between 1569 and 1571. Her second husband, Giacomo Erculiani, was also an apothecary. He inherited the role of proprietor at the Tre Stelle. The couple ended up having five children together. The details and date of her death remain a mystery, yet it is likely that she died post-1584.

== Professional life ==
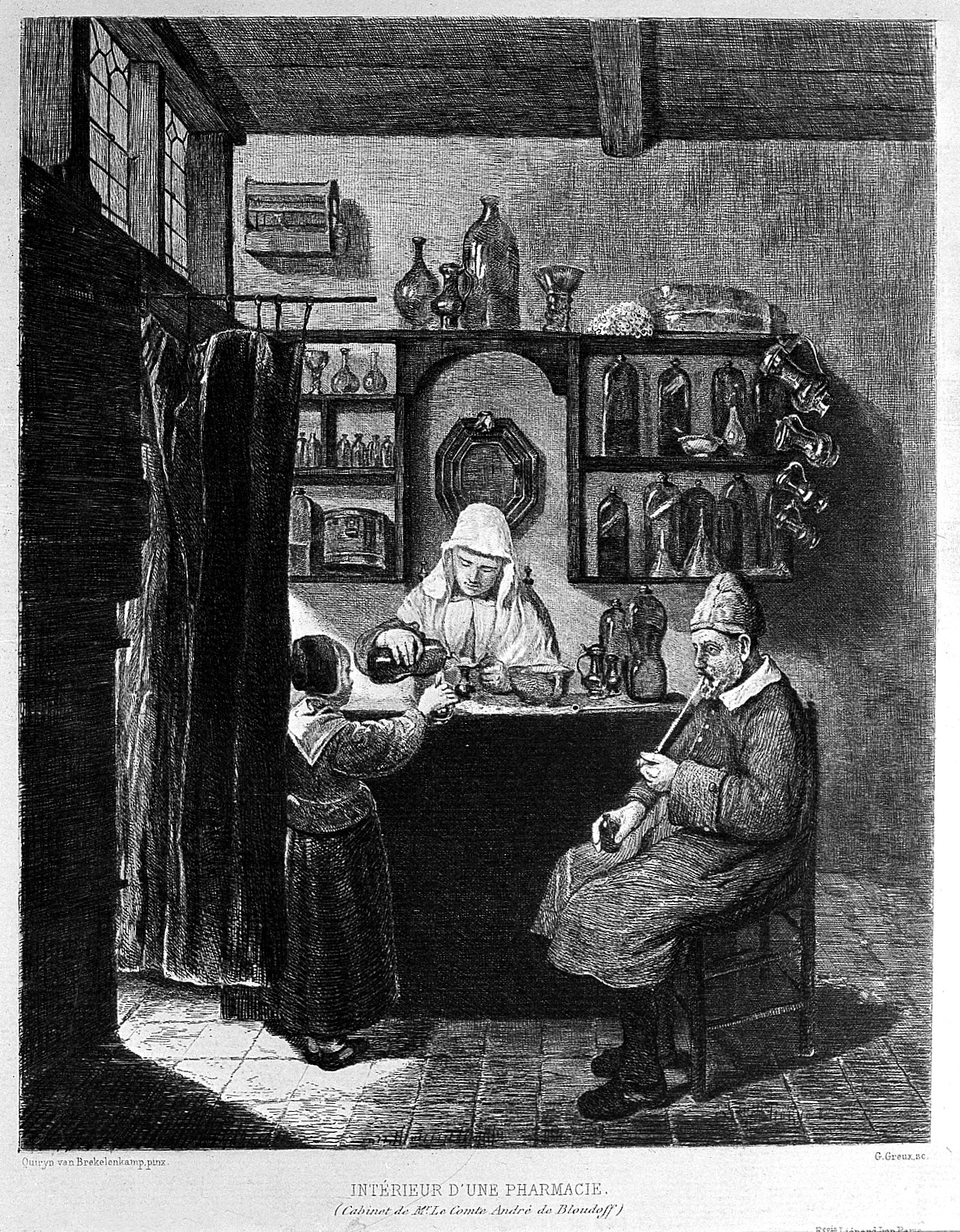
A female apothecary compounding a remedy for a patron

=== Apothecary ===
Apothecary shops are a place that is able to provide medications and remedies to diseases. These medications are typically made from "compounds and tonics". These products were formed from "ingredients such as rosewater, lavender, oatmeal, lemons, almonds, elderflower, water and even sugar". This practice is now equivalent to modern day physicians and pharmaceutical companies.

Erculiani referred to herself as a "speziala," which translates to "female spicer." Generally, this reflects that she was a spicer-apothecary, "indicating those who made and sold botanical and pharmaceutical remedies (which often included spices)." Early modern spicer-apothecaries were an outlet to buyers for both botanical and pharmaceutical remedies, selling candies, cosmetics, paper, and medicines. Other examples of goods one could purchase at an apothecary shop include herbs, fruits, precious oils, resins and perfume musk. Most of the apothecary shops were located in areas that had a small plot of land in order to build a garden, allowing immediate access to growing herbs and plants for the remedies. Typical diseases that the general population sought remedies for were "dropsy, pox, worms, rickets, scurvy, numerous skin problems and gout..." Despite her use of this title in the introduction to her published work, Erculiani was not an officially listed member of the apothecaries guild.

Erculiani worked alongside both of her husbands as a practicing female apothecary. In the early modern period, it was customary for the wives of merchants to learn their husbands' trade, as they played an integral role in the running of family businesses. She herself claimed that her knowledge did not come from any university, but was a result of innate understanding and experience.

Erculiani was very educated, despite her claims otherwise—in her works, she often cites Galen and Aristotle. Galen was a Greek physician and philosopher that had a giant influence on "medical theory and practice" at the time. Aristotle was a Greek philosopher and scientists that debated over various topics ranging from biology to physics. Both of these philosophers ended up having a major impact on Erculiani’s work and the apothecary field. The early modern pharmacy was a popular location to spread new ideas, including religious dissent, and it was frequently on watch lists during the Inquisition. This indicates the atmosphere of freedom Erculiani likely experienced in her life as an apothecary and the access she had to new ideas.

Being an apothecary was associated with practicing within a particular division of medicine. Since the majority of women in this era were denied access to university training, apprenticeship was one way to acquire the skills needed to practice. This is why most apothecaries were women. In addition, like Erculiani, widows had the option to keep their shops running as long as another man assumed proprietorship.

Although most apothecaries were women, there was “no formal recognition of women working”, regardless if they worked with familiar individuals or not. This was believed to have happened because women had such a low status economically and legally. This indicates that women were not given credit for their work as apothecaries, although they had a giant role in these shops.

She used the methods of a typical apothecary of the 16th century. Medieval apothecaries were the original "general practitioner." They were heavily involved in both dispensing medications and providing medical advice. These methods reflect practices passed on to the field of Pharmacy as the Modern Period.

=== "Principia Philosophia" ===
In her work "Principia Philosophia," Erculiani addresses several topics, all the while repeatedly hitting on the intelligence and true equality of ability possessed by women. No effort is ever made to hide the gender of the person whose work this is—it is in fact noted very early on in the text. Although she claimed early in the text to be unlearned and to focus on "innate" reasoning, she exhibits her understanding of important writers such as Galen and Aristotle and suggest well-crafted reasons to deviate from their long accepted teachings. She is also inconsistent in her work because she continually supports a separation between theology and natural philosophy, while she frequently comes close to connecting the two. The format on this work as a series of letters perhaps had the effect of cushioning the reality of the (anti-religious) statements she was making.

The introduction to her first work contains disclaimers noting that she only published by force—someone else threatened to publish her work under another name. Also in this same section, she focuses back on her roles as a wife and mother. This could arguably be a method to deflect criticism. She seems to have taken these as important parts of her life, but she no less thought women deserved a place in the realm of science.

In addition to the general content discussing the natural sciences, her work contains four letters. Two by her to Giorgio Garnero, one of Garnero's response, and a final letter addressed to Martin Berzeviczy. The use of letter writing was a popular literary technique of the age. Sometimes full published letters would be fabricated just for publishing, or real letters would be published without the permission of the sender. This method additionally permitted authors to state the views of the other side without claiming support for them, as well as create a clear avenue to respond to each point of possible criticism. Reflecting on the past is also a way to avoid criticism and the consequences of such things stated in the past. In Garnero's response, he refers to Erculiani's arguments as "gifts from the Holy Spirit" which further protects her from trouble due to her actual views. His letter continues to praise her as a positive influence in science due to her devotion that comes with little in return (no wealth, fame, or money). He is thus able to support her credibility, all the while providing counterpoints to her arguments.

One of the final big pieces of her work focused on the cause of the great Biblical flood. This was a hot topic of the century, as many were concerned that other factors would result in another one. Erculiani attempt to explain the cause of mortality beyond the Original Sin and linked it to the flood. She combines her understanding of the humors with those of the elements found in nature of earth, water, and air. Humors were understood to be linked to an element and atmospheric conditions, therefore creating four main humors: black bile, yellow bile, blood and phlegm. In explaining a cycle where by the death of man replenishes the element earth back to the planet, she postulated that a detriment existed in the supply of earth available to the Earth at the time of the flood. This factor allowed the water element to "take over" and engulf the land. This explanation was contrary to that put forth by several natural philosophers of the time, who explained that only divine intervention could cause another such flood due to the "natural stasis of elements." The focus on finding natural, scientific reasoning for Biblical events was very important during this period. Erculiani's understanding of elements through her pharmaceutical work shines through this explanation in particular, and also shows her understanding of the four major pillars of Paracelus's theory of medicine. Later in the text, she again diverges from the largely accepted views of, this time, Aristotle with regards to rainbows.

The letter to Berzevczy was framed in response to an accusation he made concerning her writings on the Biblical Flood. He considered her work not to be her own, but rather taken from the writings of others. Her response was formatted so as to demolish such a criticism in her genuine belief in the importance of free and frequent critical thought. Here, as opposed to the beginning of her Letters, she does discuss the importance of reading the works of other authors.

Her work played a great role in challenging both old scientific concepts as well as the place of women in science. There is some evidence to suggest Erculiani wrote more than her most famous work, but they have yet to be rediscovered since it refers to other works currently unknown.

== Influence ==
Camilla Erculiani's work Letters on Natural Philosophy(1584) was published and circulated in Kraków, Poland and dedicated to Anna Jagiellon (1523–1596), queen of Poland. With her strong familial and intellectual connections to Italy, Queen Anna had a reputation as an advocate for women's educational pursuits within the scientific disciplines. Although there was an upsurge of female authors engaged in scientific debate during the late sixteenth-century, Erculiani's letter-treatise is likely "the earliest sustained published exercise in natural-philosophical writing by an Italian woman." Within this scientific discourse, formed into a collection of four letters, she explored alternate theories in the realm of natural philosophy. Erculiani questioned established scientific and theological doctrine with various debates regarding meteorology, the position of Venus, astrology, the scientific cause of the Biblical flood, Paracelsian medicine, alchemy, and the formation of rainbows. In addition, Letters on Natural Philosophy served an additional purpose than just explaining a new scientific theory but allowed to demonstrate that "women could participate in the discourses of science and philosophy as equals to men."

The first two letters of Ecruliani's treatise were addressed to Giorgio Garnero (1550-1614), "a Burgundian medical writer", while the third letter consisted of his responses to her philosophical viewpoints. In an excerpt from Erculiani's letter to Garnero, she speculated that the Biblical flood occurred because of an imbalance between earth and man:

[the deluge] occurred because men's presence on earth had increased so much in number, size, and lifespan, that around the time of the sin, the earth element, which dominates men, was much diminished; nor had it been replenished for centuries, with the result that [the earth] was so greatly diminished that it was necessarily swallowed up by water, which had contributed little of itself to [the composition of] men.

Erculiani later followed up the statement within her fourth letter, addressed to Queen Anna's "chancellor for Transylvania", Martin Berzevicy (1538-1596), who visited Padua in 1568. She expressed her belief that God and nature work in unison: "it is true that the doctors of the church and the divine theologians have put forth different causes and reasons; but for me, it is enough to say that God and Nature herself do not contradict those causes, but He makes use of her in His works."

Erculiani also took advantage of her literary platform to advocate for the recognition of women as adept contributors to the scientific community. She was provoked by the querrelle des femmes (debate on women): a literary and philosophical debate about the intellectual capacities of women, which focused heavily on the women of her region. This European debate, which lasted from the "medieval to the early modern period," covered multiple issues ranging from women’s involvement in politics to the value and worth of women in society. Erculiani became a strong proponent in voicing her opinion about the debate, expressing that women have the same capabilities as men when it comes to science. Erculiani explained her position whilst referring to well-known women that she admired:

... I will not cease working to recover the honor [even] of those women who have forgotten it, and perhaps I will be the catalyst for the reawakening of their intellect.

In addition to this reaction to querrelle des femmes, Erculiani introduced her book with two prefatory letters of dedication in defense of women. Within the first, to Queen Anna of Poland, she wrote, "I don't know what malignant star causes [men] to refuse to recognize greatness, except in the things they accomplish themselves." Within the second, to her readers, Erculiani stated, "It will undoubtedly amaze some that I, a woman, have set myself to write and publish on a subject that does not belong to women (according to the custom of our age); but...you will find that women are not without the same abilities and virtues as men."

Despite her continual focus on the equality of men and women in intellect, the very differences between the two sexes as seen by society are perhaps what saved her from the Inquisition. The Inquisition was established by the Catholic Church in order to eliminate and inflict penalty on those committing heresy throughout Europe and the Americas. They became known for providing severe and inescapable punishments. Although Erculiani caught the eye of the Inquisition on numerous occasions, she managed to still be able to publish her writings by deciding to publish in Poland instead of Italy. This allowed her to become one of the first women philosophers to devote a book "to questions of natural philosophy and [promote] her own original theories."

== See also ==
- apothecary
- Anna Jagiellon

== Bibliography ==
- Carinci, Eleonora. Una speziala Padovana: Lettere di philosophia naturale di Camilla Erculiani (1584). Italian Studies 68. 2 (2013), 202-29.
- Corrispondenze scientifiche tra Cinquecento e Seicento. Camilla Erculiani, Lettere di philosophia naturale ed. by Eleonora Carinci; Margherita Sarrocchi, Lettere a Galileo, ed. by Sandra Plastina. Lugano: Agorà, 2016.
- Cox, Virginia. The Prodigious Muse: Women's Writing in Counter- Reformation Italy. Baltimore: The Johns Hopkins University Press, 2011.
- Cox, Virginia. Women's Writing in Italy 1400-1650. Baltimore: The Johns Hopkins University Press, 2008.
- Erculiani, Camilla. Letters on Natural Philosophy, ed. Eleonora Carinci; trans. Hannah Marcus; foreword Paula Findlen. The Other Voice in Early Modern Europe series (Toronto: Iter Press, 2021).
- Ray, Meredith K. Daughters of Alchemy: Women and Scientific Culture in Early Modern Italy. Cambridge: Harvard University Press, 2015.
- Whaley, Leigh. Women and the Practice of Medical Care in Early Modern Europe, 1400-1800. New York: Palgrave Macmillan, 2011.
