= Lago di Cei =

Lake in Italy

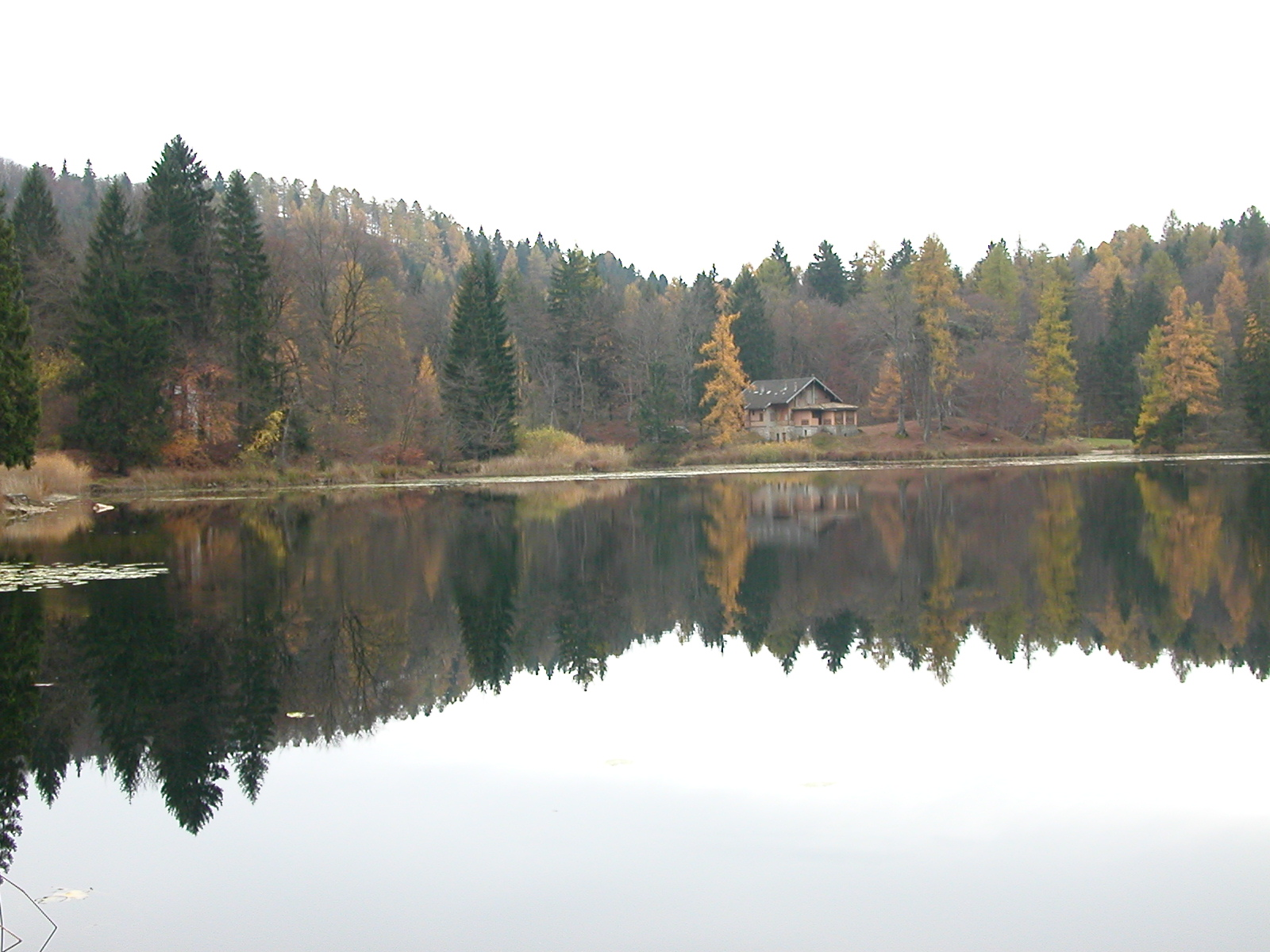

- Location within Italy
- Location: Trentino
- Coordinates: 45.951°N 11.020°E
- Primary outflows: Rio Arione
- Basin countries: Italy
- Average depth: 13.5 m (44 ft)
- Surface elevation: 918 m (3,012 ft)
- Islands: 1 little island
- Settlements: Castellano, frazione of Villa Lagarina

Lago di Cei (Lach de Zéi in local dialect), is a lake in the comune of Villa Lagarina, not far from Rovereto in Trentino, northern Italy.

The whole basin in which the lake lies was once occupied by a single, larger lake. After the latter drained, two smaller lakes remained: the largest, having a surface of c. 4.5 hectares, receives the water of the other (called Lagabis), which has a semicircular shape a from which the Rio Arione outflows.

== See also ==
- Monte Bondone
