= Nogaredo witch trial =

1646–1647 witch trial in Italy

The Witch trial of Nogaredo took place in 1646–1647 in Nogaredo in Italy. It attracted considerable attention and is one of the best documented cases of witch trials in Italy. It led to the death of between eight and ten people.

== Maria Salvatori ==
On 26 October 1646, Maria Salvatori from Castelnovo, nicknamed "la Mercuria," was arrested and accused of witch craft. Salvatori had long been suspected of sorcery. She was accused of not swallowing the Host at her communions but instead preserving it for use in sorcery. She was also accused of having caused Marchioness Bevilacqua to miscarry by the use of spells. During torture, she pointed out the widow Domenica Camelli, and Domenica's daughter, Lucia Caveden, as witches. Salvatori claimed that she had given a host to Lucia Caveden, who used it to cast the spell on Marchioness Bevilacqua. She named a certain Delaito Cavaleri was a necromancer and a worshipper of Satan.

== The Trial ==
The witch trial formally opened on Saturday, 24 November 1646, at Nogaredo. Lucia Caveden pointed out Domenica Gratiadei, in whose house several objects were found which incriminated her. Domenica Gratiadei confessed under torture to have attended the witch sabbat, cast the evil eye on Cristofero Sparamani, renounced her baptism and defiled the Sacrament. Benvenuta, the daughter of Domenica Gratiadei, confessed that her mother had taken her to Satan, "as if in a dream", where she had had sexual intercourse with him.

Domenica Gratiadei confessed to have officiated at the witch sabbats alongside a warlock named Santo Peterlino, where they all sang, danced and gave Satan the hosts from the communion. The witches, she claimed, all smeared themselves in an unguent made of "the Blessed Sacrament, the blood of certain small animals, Holy Water, the fat of dead babies" while chanting blasphemies, and then transformed themselves in to cats when they left for the Sabbath. The witch trial stretched out for several months, implicated more people and draw a great crowd.

Domenica Camelli, Lucia Caveden, Domenica Gratiadei, Catterina Baroni, Zinevra Chemola, Isabella and Polonia Gratiadei, and Valentina Andrei were condemned to death. Maria Salvatori, and Maddalena Andrei, who was known as "la Filosofa", both died in prison. The condemned were beheaded and their bodies burned on 14 April 1647. It is suggested that Isabella and Polonia Gratiadei and Valentina Andrei managed to escape.

== Literature ==
- The geography of witchcraft by Montague Summers
- A. Romanazzi, La Dea Madre e il Culto Betilico, antiche conoscenze tra mito e Folklore, Levante editore, Bari 2003;
- T. Dandolo, La Signora di Monza e le streghe del Tirolo, Milano 1855.
- Abele De Blasio: Inciarmatori, maghi e streghe di Benevento
