= Nogaredo =

- Comune
- Comune di Nogaredo
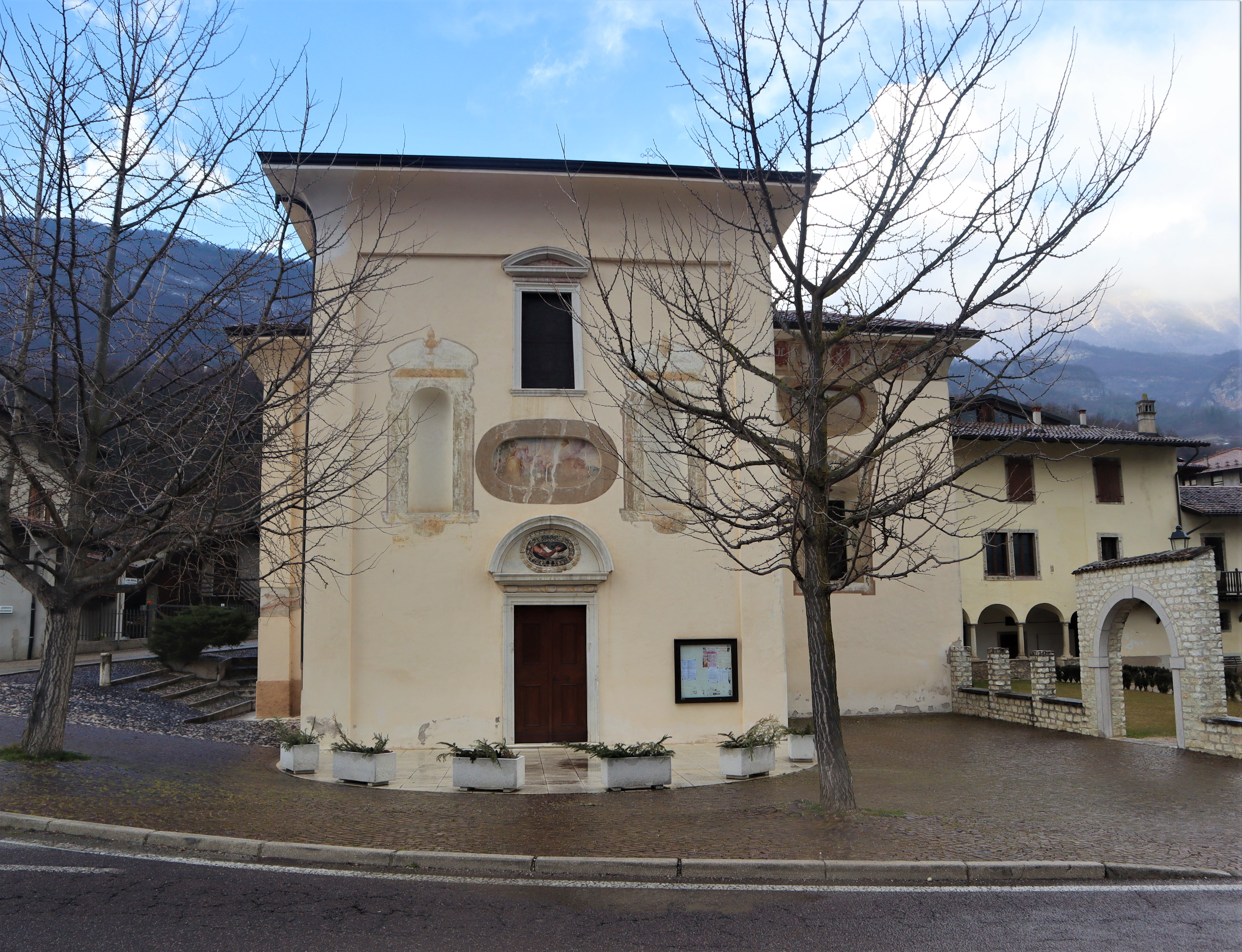

- Location within Italy Location within Trentino-Alto Adige/Südtirol
- Coordinates: 45°55′N 11°2′E
- Country: Italy
- Region: Trentino-Alto Adige/Südtirol
- Province: Trentino (TN)

Government
  - Mayor: Alberto Scerbo

Area
  - Total: 3.6 km^{2} (1.4 sq mi)

Population (2026)
  - Total: 2,104
  - Density: 580/km^{2} (1,500/sq mi)
- Time zone: UTC+1 (CET)
  - Summer (DST): UTC+2 (CEST)
- Postal code: 38060
- Dialing code: 0464
- Website: Official website

Nogaredo (Nogarédo in local dialect) is a comune (municipality) in Trentino in the northern Italian region Trentino-Alto Adige/Südtirol, located about 20 kilometres (12 mi) southwest of Trento. As of 31 December 2004, it had a population of 1,747 and an area of 3.6 square kilometres (1.4 mi^{2}).

Nogaredo borders the following municipalities: Villa Lagarina, Isera and Rovereto.

== Demographic evolution ==
Historical population

Year	Pop.	±%
1861	?	—
1871	?	—
1881	?	—
1901	?	—
1911	?	—

Year	Pop.	±%
1921	1,196	—
1931	1,248	+4.3%
1936	1,214	−2.7%
1951	1,249	+2.9%
1961	1,260	+0.9%

Year	Pop.	±%
1971	1,368	+8.6%
1981	1,506	+10.1%
1991	1,582	+5.0%
2001	1,663	+5.1%

Source: Data from ISTAT

== Economy ==
- Marzadro Distillery
