= Roman Inquisition =

System of tribunals enforcing Catholic orthodoxy

The Roman Inquisition, formally Suprema Congregatio Sanctae Romanae et Universalis Inquisitionis (Latin for 'the Supreme Sacred Congregation of the Roman and Universal Inquisition'), was a system of partisan tribunals developed by the Holy See of the Catholic Church, during the second half of the 16th century, responsible for prosecuting individuals accused of a wide array of crimes according to Catholic law and doctrine, relating to Catholic religious life or alternative religious or secular beliefs. It was established in 1542 by the leader of the Catholic Church, Pope Paul III. In the period after the Medieval Inquisition, it was one of three different manifestations of the wider Catholic Inquisition, the other two being the Spanish Inquisition and Portuguese Inquisition.

== Function and functioning ==
The main function of the institution was to maintain and implement papal bulls and other church rulings, in addition to their function of administering legalistic ramifications upon deviants of Catholic orthodoxy within states that cooperated with the pope and ostensibly exhibiting proper procedure to Catholic states in the process of formulating the Counter-Reformation. The papal bull Ad abolendam, by Lucius III, prescribed penalties for heretical clerics and laymen and established a procedure of systematic inquisition by bishops; the third canon of the fourth Lateran Council (1215) specified procedures against heretics and their accomplices. Clerics were to be degraded from their orders, lay persons were to be branded as infamous and not be admitted to public offices or councils or to run a business, will not have the freedom to make a will nor shall succeed to an inheritance, goods were to be confiscated. A secular leader who "neglects to cleanse his territory of this heretical filth" would be excommunicated and the supreme pontiff could declare his vassals absolved from their fealty to him and make the land available for occupation by Catholics who would possess it unopposed and preserve it in the purity of the faith.

The organisational system of the Roman Inquisition did differ essentially from that of the Medieval Inquisition. Typically, the pope appointed one cardinal to preside over meetings of the Congregation. Though often referred to in historical literature as Grand Inquisitors, the role was substantially different from the formally appointed Grand Inquisitor of the Spanish Inquisition. There were usually ten other cardinals who were members of the Congregation, as well as a prelate and two assistants all chosen from the Dominican Order. The Holy Office also had an international group of consultants; experienced scholars of theology and canon law who advised on specific questions. The congregation, in turn, presided over the activity of local tribunals.

== History ==
The Roman Inquisition began in 1542 as part of the Catholic Church's Counter-Reformation against the spread of Protestantism, but it represented a less harsh affair than the previously established Spanish Inquisition. In 1588, Pope Sixtus V established, with Immensa Aeterni Dei, 15 congregations of the Roman Curia, of which the Supreme Sacred Congregation of the Roman and Universal Inquisition was one. In 1908, it was renamed the Supreme Sacred Congregation of the Holy Office. In 1965, it was renamed again to the Congregation for the Doctrine of the Faith and later renamed once again in 2022 to the Dicastery for the Doctrine of the Faith.

While the Roman Inquisition was originally designed to combat the spread of Protestantism in Italy, the institution outlived that original purpose, and the system of tribunals lasted until the mid 18th century, when pre-unification Italian states began to suppress the local inquisitions, effectively eliminating the power of the church to prosecute heretical crimes.

== Notable subjects of investigation ==
=== Copernicus ===
Nicolaus Copernicus circulated for scholarly discussion his hypothesis of a cosmos that was heliocentric and an Earth that rotated around its own axis, first, in 1514 in a manuscript essay, "De hypothesibus motuum coelestium commentariolus" (Brief Commentary on the Hypotheses of Heavenly Movements), and then more robustly in the book De revolutionibus orbium coelestium (On the Revolutions of the Heavenly Spheres), in 1543. The book was dedicated to Pope Paul III, who was known for his interests in astronomy. Both works were known in Rome, and neither attracted adverse theological responses in the sixteenth century.

Some seven decades following Copernicus's death, specialists in mathematics, philosophy, and Catholic theology, whom the Roman Inquisition consulted in response to complaints made against Galileo in 1616, judged the proposition that the sun is immobile and at the center of the universe and that the Earth moves around it, to be "foolish and absurd in philosophy" and that the first was "formally heretical" while the second was "at least erroneous in faith". (Note: The original assessment document from the Inquisition was made available to the public in 2014.)

While the Inquisition refrained from condemning either Copernicus or his book (or Galileo) on the basis of this assessment, several theological claims in De revolutionibus were ordered to be excised in future publications. Unexpurgated versions of On the Revolutions of the Heavenly Spheres were placed on the Index Librorum Prohibitorum (Index of Forbidden Books).

=== Galileo ===
Galileo Galilei revised the Copernican theories and was admonished for his views on heliocentrism in 1615. The Roman Inquisition concluded that his theory could only be supported as a possibility, not as an established fact. Galileo later defended his views in Dialogue Concerning the Two Chief World Systems (1632), which attacked Pope Urban VIII and thus alienated him and the Jesuits, who had both supported Galileo up until that point.

He was tried by the Inquisition in 1633. Galileo was found "vehemently suspect of heresy", forced to recant, and the Dialogue Concerning the Two Chief World Systems was placed on the Index Librorum Prohibitorum (Index of Forbidden Books). He spent the rest of his life under house arrest at his villa in Arcetri near the city of Florence.

=== John Bargrave ===
17th century English traveler and author John Bargrave, gave an account of his interactions with the Roman Inquisition. Arriving in the city of Reggio (having travelled from Modena), Bargrave was stopped by the city guard who inspected his books on suspicion some may have been on the Index Librorum Prohibitorum. Bargrave was brought before the city's chief inquisitor who suggested they converse in Latin rather than Italian so that the guards might be prevented from understanding them. The inquisitor told him that the inquisition were not accustomed to stopping visitors or travellers unless someone had suggested they do so (Bargrave suspected that Jesuits in Rome had made accusations against him). Nonetheless, Bargrave was told he was required to hold a license from the inquisition. Even with a license, Bargrave was prohibited from carrying any books "printed at any heretical city, as Geneva, Amsterdam, Leyden, London, or the like". Bargrave provided a catalogue of his books to the inquisition and was provided with a license to carry them for the rest of his journey.

=== Others ===
Among the subjects of this Inquisition were Franciscus Patricius, Giordano Bruno, Tommaso Campanella, Gerolamo Cardano, Cesare Cremonini and Camilla Erculiani. Of these, only Bruno was executed, in 1600. The miller Domenico Scandella was also burned at the stake on the orders of Pope Clement VIII in 1599 for his belief that God was created from chaos. The friar Fulgenzio Manfredi, who had preached against the pope, was tried by the Inquisition and executed in 1610.

The Inquisition also concerned itself with the Benandanti in the Friuli region, but considered them a lesser danger than the Protestant Reformation and only handed out light sentences.

== Inquisition in Italy and Malta ==
The Inquisition in Malta (1561 to 1798) is generally considered to have been gentler.

Italian historian Andrea Del Col estimates that out of 51,000–75,000 cases judged by the Inquisition in Italy after 1542, around 1,250 resulted in a death sentence.

== Historiography and witchcraft accusations ==
The Inquisitions have long been one of the primary subjects in the scholarly debates regarding witchcraft accusations of the early modern period. Historian Henry Charles Lea places an emphasis on torture methods employed to force confessions from the convicted. Carlo Ginzburg, in The Night Battles, discussed how Inquisitorial propaganda of demonology distorted popular folk beliefs. In similar light, Elliott P. Currie saw the Inquisitions as one singular, ongoing phenomenon, which drove the witch-hunt to its peak. Currie argued that the methods pioneered by the Inquisition indirectly guided continental Europe to a series of persecutions motivated by profit. Second-wave feminism also saw a surge of historical interpretation of the witch-hunt. A number of 100,000 to 9,000,000 executions was given, all of which was attributed to the Inquisition. Feminist scholars Claudia Honeger and Nelly Moia saw the early modern witch-craze as a product of Inquisitorial influence, namely the Malleus Maleficarum. Feminist writers Mary Daly, Barbara Walker, and Witch Starhawk argued that the Inquisitions were responsible for countless, "hundreds of thousands, perhaps millions", deaths, most of them women. This notion was similarly echoed by third-wave feminism writer Elizabeth Connor, who agreed with the notion of "gynocide", or "woman hunting", inaugurated by the Malleus. The same sentiment regarding the Inquisition's notorious reputation of torture was shared by American writer and attorney Jonathan Kirsch. In his book, The Grand Inquisitor's Manual: A History of Terror in the Name of God, Kirsch argued that the Inquisition's use of torture not only applied to the witch-craze which peaked in early 17th century, but also to the Salem witch trials. This model of repressive system, Kirsch argued, was also applied in Nazism, Soviet Russia, Japanese internment camps, McCarthyism, and most recently, the war on terror.

Through further research and available evidence, the Roman Inquisition was seen in a different light. In contrast with feminist arguments historians like Clarke Garrett, Brian P. Levack, John Tedeschi, Matteo Duni, and Diane Purkiss pointed out that most witch trials and executions were conducted by local and secular authorities. Clarke Garrett mentioned the quick decline and insignificance of the Malleus Maleficarum. In-depth historical research regarding minor details of different types of magic, theological heresies, and political climate of The Reformation further revealed that Inquisitorial procedures greatly restrained witch hunting in Italy. Scholars specializing in the Renaissance and Early Modern period such as Guido Ruggiero, Christopher F. Black, and Mary O'Neil also discussed the importance of proper procedures and sparse use of torture. The low rate of torture and lawful interrogation, Black argued, means that trials tended to focus more on individual accusation, instead of groups. For the same reason, the notion of the Black Sabbath was much less accepted in contemporary Italian popular culture. The Holy Office's function in the disenchantment of popular culture also helped advance rationalism by getting rid of superstitions. Jeffrey R. Watt refutes the feminist claim that the Inquisition was responsible for the death of so many women. Watt points out that in 1588 the Roman Curia stated it would only allow testimony about participation in a Sabbath by the practitioners themselves and not by outside witnesses. Additionally, the Inquisition would eventually ban torture for the procurement of a witchcraft confession. The Holy Office also began seeking less harsh punishment for witches and viewed witches as those who had simply lost their way and who could be redeemed, not as apostates deserving death.

Historians who leaned toward the witch-hunt-restraining argument were more inclined to differentiate different Inquisitions, and often drew contrast between Italy versus Central Europe. The number of executed witches is also greatly lowered, to between 45,000 and 60,000. Those who argued for the fault of the Inquisition in the witch-craze are more likely to contrast continental Europe to England, as well as seeing the Inquisitions as one singular event which lasted 600 years since its founding in the 11th or 12th century. The significance and emphasis of the Malleus Maleficarum is seen more frequently in arguments which hold the Inquisition accountable for the witch-craze.

== See also ==
- Pomponio Algerio, attracted attention of the Inquisition and finally executed by civil authorities
- Francesco Barberini (1597–1679), secretary of the Inquisition 1633-79
- Sébastien Bourdon (1616–1671), a French Protestant painter forced to flee Italy
- Cornelio Da Montalcino, a Franciscan friar who had embraced Judaism, and was burned alive on the Campo dei Fiori
- Counter-Reformation
- Tommaso Crudeli, freemason imprisoned by the Inquisition
- Diego de Enzinas, Protestant burnt to the stake in 1547
- Madonna Oriente case in 1390
- Pietro Ottoboni (1667–1740), secretary of the Inquisition 1726-40

== Short bibliography ==
- Christopher Black, The Italian Inquisition, Yale University Press, New Haven–London 2009
- Costantino Corvisieri, "Compendio dei processi del Santo Uffizio di Roma (da Paolo III a Paolo IV)," Archivio della Società romana di storia patria 3 (1880), 261–290; 449-471
- Andrea Del Col, L'Inquisizione in Italia. Dall'XI al XXI secolo, Mondadori, Milan 2006
- Dizionario storico dell'Inquisizione, edited by V. Lavenia, A. Prosperi, J. Tedeschi, 4 vol., Edizioni della Normale, Pisa 2010
- Massimo Firpo, Inquisizione romana e Controriforma. Studi sul cardinal Giovanni Morone (1509–1580) e il suo processo d'eresia, 2nd edition, Morcelliana, Brescia 2005
- Massimo Firpo, Vittore Soranzo vescovo ed eretico. Riforma della Chiesa e Inquisizione nell'Italia del Cinquecento, Laterza, Rome–Bari 2006
- Giovanni Romeo, Inquisitori, esorcisti e streghe nell'Italia della Controriforma, Sansoni, Florence, 1990
- Giovanni Romeo, Ricerche su confessione dei peccati e Inquisizione nell'Italia del Cinquecento, La Città del Sole, Naples, 1997
- Giovanni Romeo, L'Inquisizione nell'Italia moderna, Laterza, Rome-Bari, 2002
- Giovanni Romeo, Amori proibiti. I concubini tra Chiesa e Inquisizione, Laterza, Rome-Bari, 2008
- John Tedeschi, The prosecution of heresy: collected studies on the Inquisition in early modern Italy, Medieval & Renaissance texts & studies, Binghamton, New York 1991.
- Maria Francesca Tiepolo, "Venezia", La Guida generale degli Archivi di Stato, IV, Ministero per i beni culturali e ambientali, Ufficio centrale per i beni archivistici, Roma, 1994, pp. 857–1014, 1062–1070, 1076–1140
