= Doñas de fuera =

Figures in Sicilian folklore

In the historical folklore of Sicily, Doñas de fuera (Spanish for "Ladies from the Outside"; Sicily was under Spanish rule at the time) were supernatural female beings comparable to the fairies of English folklore. In the 16th to mid-17th centuries, the doñas de fuera also played a role in the witch trials in Sicily.

== The Fairies of Sicily ==
In historical Sicilian folklore, the doñas de fuera would make contact with humans, mostly women deemed to have “sweet blood”, whom they took to Benevento ("the Blockula of Sicily"), by mounting them on magical, flying goats. The fairies were called doñas de fuera, which was also a name for the women who associated with them. They were described as beauties dressed in white, red or black; they could be male or female, and their feet were the paws of cats, horses or of a peculiar "round" shape. They came in groups of five or seven and a male fairy played the lute or the guitar while dancing. The fairies and the humans were divided into companies in different sizes (different ones for noble and non-noble humans), under the lead of an ensign.

Every Tuesday, Thursday and Saturday, the fairies met the humans belonging to their company in the woods. In March, several companies gathered, and their "Prince" instructed them to be benevolent creatures. A congregation called The Seven Fairies could transform themselves to cats and something called aydon; ayodons were able to kill.

The fairies could easily be offended by humans. In one story, a man who was not associated with the fairies and was unable to see them developed a painful cramp after hitting one of the fairies who was listening to him play music. Another story involves several people who had disturbed the fairies while they nocturnally travelled from house to house, eating and drinking as they routinely embraced the town's infants. On those occasions, the person in question paid one of the people associated with the fairies to be the host of a dinner at their homes, meeting the fairies while the owners of the house slept.

Between 1579 and 1651 there were a number of recorded witch trials in Sicily. The trial summaries, sent to the Spanish Inquisition's Suprema in Madrid by the Sicilian tribunal, reflected a total of 65 people, eight of them male, many of whom were believed to be associates of fairies, who were put on trial for sorcery.

The Inquisition denounced them as witches, but often did not take these cases seriously as the accused never mentioned the Devil in their confessions. The Inquisition did occasionally associate meetings with the elves as events similar to a Witches' Sabbath, but as the local population generally held a positive view of the phenomena, the Inquisition did not press the matter. The accused said that they had become associated with the fairies because they had "Sweet blood", and that in most cases, went to the meetings in a non-corporeal fashion, leaving their actual bodies behind. This is similar to the concept of astral projection and was something they had in common with the Benandanti, a related group that also faced scrutiny by the Inquisition.

== Witch trials in Sicily ==
Compared to surrounding countries, the witch trials in Sicily were relatively mild: in most cases, the accused were either freed, sentenced to exile, or jailed, rather than sentenced to death. Though the accused occasionally testified that some nobles took part in these activities, the accused themselves are generally described as poor, and most often, female.

The accused evidently gave their testimonies to the Inquisition without being tortured. Fairy folklore was commonplace during this time and, according to reports, the accused were not ashamed of their actions, and some may not have realized their beliefs would be disliked by the Christian church. According to some of the accused, the fairies did not like speaking about the Christian God or the Virgin Mary, but despite this, the accused themselves did not regard this belief to be contrary to the values of Christianity. Ultimately, the Inquisition did not show much interest in the Sicilian fairy trials, instead attempting to make the accused change their freely given testimonies and direct it toward the traditional Witch's Sabbath that involved demons and devils rather than fairies. During the course of the trials they did succeed in some cases, but in general, the long-held belief that fairies were benevolent creatures remained in Sicily long after the Inquisition.

In 1630, the medicine woman Vicencia la Rosa was sentenced to banishment and banned from ever mentioning anything about the elves again. After her sentence, la Rosa continued to tell stories about her personal elf named Martinillo, who took her to "Benevento" where she had sex and learned medicine. She was arrested again and exiled from Sicily for the rest of her life.

== The fisherwife of Palermo ==
The fisherwife of Palermo was an unnamed Italian woman who was put on trial for witchcraft by the Sicilian Inquisition in Palermo in Sicily in 1588. She claimed to associate with fairies and her confession was among the first that describes contact between elves and humans on Sicily. Her case was among the first of many witch trials in Sicily associated with elves and her confession was typical for such elf-related cases.

She told them that when she was 8 years old, she had flown through the air with a group of women on goats to a vast field on the mainland of the Kingdom of Naples called Benevento, where a red-coloured teenage boy and a beautiful woman sat on a throne. According to her confession, they were called the King and the Queen. She said that the leader of the women who took her there, who was called the Ensign, told her that if she fell to her knees in front of the King and Queen of the elves and gave them allegiance, they would give her riches, beauty and handsome men, with whom she could have sex, and that she was not to worship God or the holy Virgin. The Ensign also added that she should not mention the Virgin Mary, as it was bad manners to do so in the presence of the Elves. The fisherwife then agreed to worship the King as a god and the Queen as a goddess, and she swore her allegiance in a book containing many letters which was held for her by the ensign, and promised her body and soul to the divine couple. After this, tables with food were set forward, and everyone ate, drank and had sex with each other. She also claimed that she had sex with multiple men in a short period of time, after which she reported that she had awoken as if from a dream. She claimed that she was not aware that this was sinful before the priest told her, after she had told him this, that such things were the work of Satan. She said that she had continued with it anyway, because it had made her so happy. On some occasions, she said, the elves had fetched her before she had gone to sleep for the night to prevent her husband and children from noticing anything. She claimed that she was awake the whole time. She also stated that the King and Queen had given her medicine to cure the sick, so she could earn money and alleviate her poverty.

=== Protocol of statement ===
The protocol of the Inquisition states how the fisherwife and the other women flew through the air on goats to:

a land called Benevento which belongs to the Pope and is situated in the kingdom of Naples. There was a field and in its center a platform with two chairs. On one was a red teenage boy and on the other a beautiful woman, whom the called the Queen, and the man was the king. The first time she came there — she was eight — the "ensign" and the other women in her company told her that she must kneel and worship the king and the queen and to all they commanded for they could help her and give her riches, beauty and young men to make love to. And they told her not to worship God or the holy Virgin. The Ensign made her swear on a book with large letters that she would worship the two others. The king as if he was God and the Queen as if she was the holy virgin, and gave herself to them with body and soul... And after she had so worshipped them, they made the tables and ate and drank, and thereafter the men had intercourse with the women and with her many times in a short period of time. All of this seem to her as if a dream, for when she awoke, she did so in her bed, naked as if she had gone to rest. But sometimes they had called upon her before she had gone to bed so that her husband and children would not notice it, and without having gone to sleep before (as far as she could tell), she left and arrived fully clothed. She further claimed that she at that time did not realise that it was sinful before her confessor had opened her eyes and told her that it was Satan and that she was not allowed to do it further, but she still continued it until two months ago. And she left filled with happiness of the joy she received from it... and because (the king and the queen) gave her means to cure the sick so that she could earn some money, because she had always been poor

After this freely given statement, the Inquisition interrogated her and asked her leading questions. The attitude of the Inquisition was that fairies did not exist, but were a remnant of pagan superstition which should be eradicated and not be taken seriously. Therefore, the events she described must have been either a dream, in which case they could accept her story about the fairies, or, if it did happen, it must have been a witch's sabbath. Therefore, they asked her leading questions to make her identify the events as either a dream or reality. If it were the former, she would be released, and if it were the latter, she would be a witch. The fisherwife, however, passed this interrogation of leading questions: the protocols state that in the end, she came to the conclusion that "all of this seem to her to have happened as if in a dream", and that it had truly all been just a dream, "as far as she could estimate the matter".

== See also ==
- Witch trials in Italy
- Biddy Early
- Fairy Investigation Society
- Karin Svensdotter
