= Guido Ruggiero =

American historian

- Born: Danbury, Connecticut
- Education: M.A., Ph.D.
- Alma mater: University of Colorado, UCLA
- Occupations: Microhistorian, professor

Guido Ruggiero is a historian of the history of Italy from the fourteenth to seventeenth centuries. He is Professor of History and Cooper Fellow of the College of Arts and Sciences at the University of Miami, Emeritus. His work focuses on the historical analysis of gender, sex, crime, violence, magic, science, and everyday life and culture. He combines literary analysis with history.

His monographs include Violence in Early Renaissance Venice (Rutgers, 1980), The Boundaries of Eros: Sex Crime and Sexuality in Renaissance Venice (Oxford, 1985), Binding Passions: Tales of Magic, Marriage and Power from the End of the Renaissance (Oxford, 1993), Machiavelli in Love: Sex, Self and Society in Renaissance Italy (Johns Hopkins, 2007), The Renaissance in Italy: A Social and Cultural History of the Rinascimento (Cambridge, 2014), Love and Sex in a Time of Plague: A Decameron Renaissance (I Tatti Studies in Italian Renaissance History, Harvard University, 2021). In addition to his own books, Ruggiero has edited with James Farr Historicizing Life-Writing and Egodocuments in Early Modern Europe (Palgrave Macmillan, 2022); co-edited and translated with Laura Giannetti Five Comedies from the Italian Renaissance (Johns Hopkins, 2003) and edited The Blackwell Companion to the Renaissance (Wiley-Blackwell, 2002). He served as both series editor for Studies in the History of Sexuality (1985-2002) for Oxford University Press and co-editor of the six-volume Encyclopedia of European Social History for Scribner’s (2002). With Edward Muir, Ruggiero edited select articles from the Italian journal Quaderni Storici, making them accessible to English-speaking audiences, among them Sex and Gender in Historical Perspectives (Johns Hopkins, 1990), Microhistory and the Lost Peoples of Europe (Johns Hopkins, 1991), and History from Crime (Johns Hopkins, 1993).

Ruggiero was awarded the John Simon Guggenheim Foundation Fellowship, the Robert Lehman Visiting Professor in Residence at Harvard’s Villa I Tatti in Florence, the Rome Scholar in Residence at the American Academy in Rome, and membership in the School of Historical Studies at the Institute for Advanced Study at Princeton.

== See also ==
- Microhistory
