= Val Camonica witch trials =

16th-century Italian witch trials

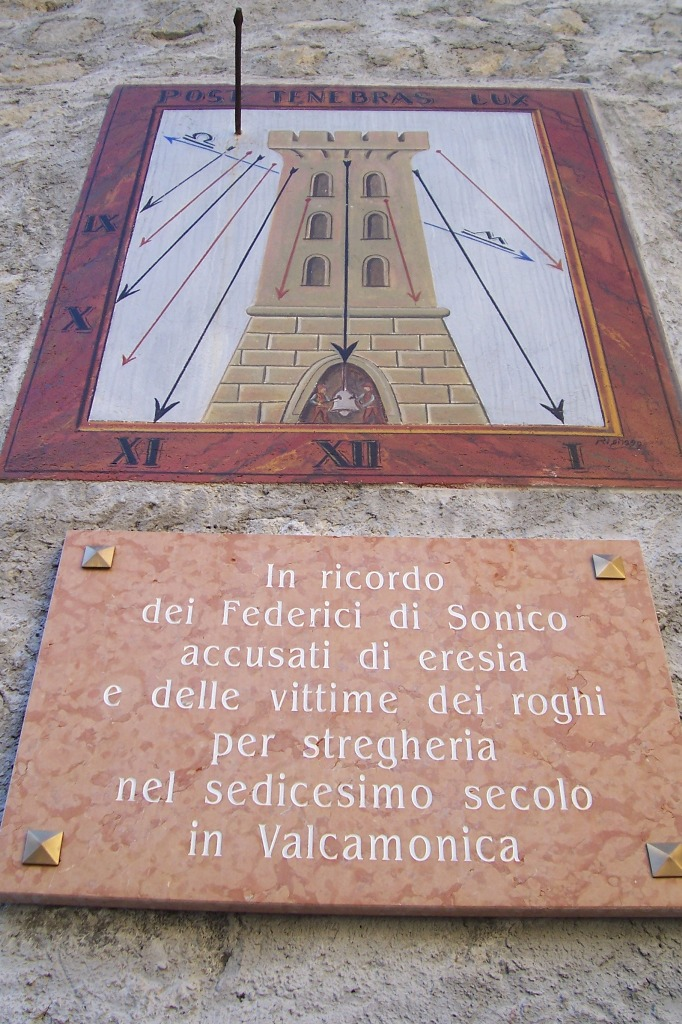
Val Camonica witch trials

The Val Camonica witch trials were two large witch trials which took place in Val Camonica in Italy, in 1505–1510 and 1518–1521.

The best source for the trials is considered to be the Venetian Marin Sanudo, who was the chronicler to the Council of Ten from 1496 to 1536. The documentary evidence was destroyed by order of Giacinto Gaggia, the bishop of Brescia, to prevent it from being used by the anticlerical opposition.

== Background ==
The region had not undergone full conversion to Christianity until the 5th century, and thus even by the 8th century, the area was still suspect for paganism. For example, after a ban on the practice promulgated in 724, Liutprand, King of the Lombards, feared the area would rebel. In the laws of 1498, stern laws are issued against all "Devilish heresy". In 1499, it was accused of having participated in a "Black mass", and it was reported to be common with such "depravity" in the area.

== The first trial 1505–1510 ==
In 1433, witches were burnt in South Tirol, 1460 in Valtellina, and in 1485, the Inquisitor Antonio da Brescia had strongly criticized the ongoing heresy and witchcraft in Val Camonica in the Venetian Senate. On 23 June 1505, seven women and one man were burned in Cemmo in Val Camonica, and in 1510, witches were burned who were accused of having caused the drought by magic: 60 women and men confessed having injured people, animals and land with their spells, caused fires with help of Satan: "The whole world mourns for the sad lack of faith in God and the saints in Valcamonica. In four places in Valcamonica, c. sixty four people men and women, have been executed, and many more are placed in prison..."

== The second trial 1518–1521 ==
The second trial occurred after the peace of Noyon with France. During the first months of 1518, inquisitors were stationed in the parishes of the Val Camonica; Don Bernardino de Grossis in Pisogne, Don James de Gablani in Rogno, Don Valerio de Boni in Breno, Don Donato de Savallo in Cemmo and Don Battista Capurione in Edolo, all under the bishop Inquisitor Peter Durante, who presided at the central court of the Inquisition at Cemmo. In July 1518, more than sixty women and men were burned at the stake.

In a letter from August 1518, an official, Josef di Orzinuovi, reported of the trial to Ludovico Quercini. He reported that several people had been burned for witch craft after spreading the plague by magic. They were also accused of causing thunder and lightning storms.

The same year, one Carlo Miani, a venetian nobleman, wrote to Dr Zorzi: "Some women in Breto have confessed to have spread powder from Satan through the air, which caused sickness and the death of 200 people..."

== Aftermath ==
In 1573, it was reported that Christianity was still weak in the area; few fulfilled their religious responsibilities, women went to church without covering their hair with a veil, people danced on holidays. In 1580, the church again instigated a visit to make the inhabitants more Catholic. A lot of old Pagan cults and habits were still alive there. On The Tonale mountain, the "witches" were reputed to meet at July. This time, however, the visit of the church did not lead to executions.
