= Dro, Trentino =

Dro
- Comune
- Comune di Dro
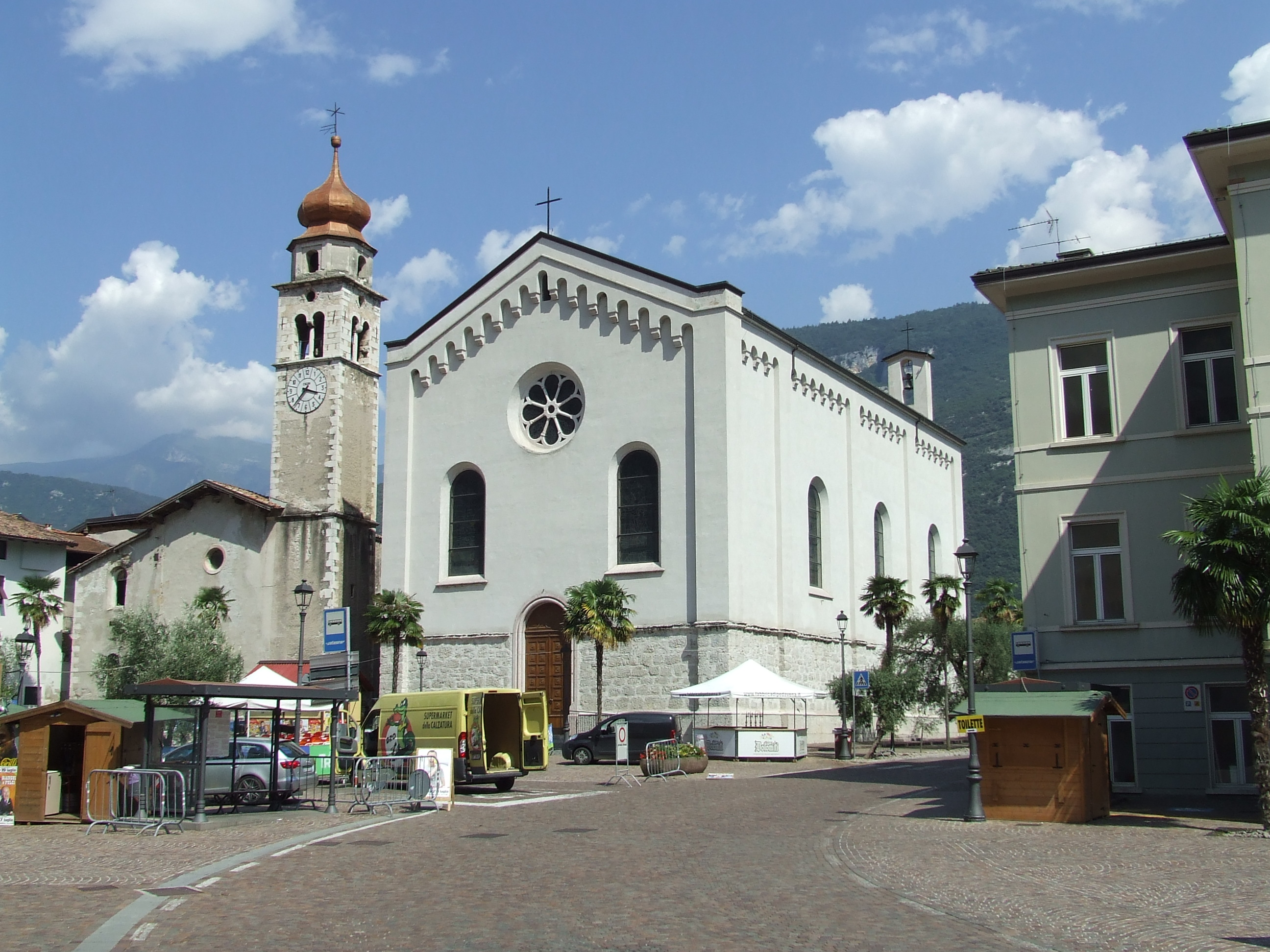
- Dro in Trentino - church

- Location within Italy Location within Trentino-Alto Adige/Südtirol
- Coordinates: 45°57′40″N 10°54′40″E
- Country: Italy
- Region: Trentino-Alto Adige/Südtirol
- Province: Trentino (TN)
- Frazioni: Ceniga, Pietramurata

Government
  - Mayor: Ginetta Santoni (2025-)

Area
  - Total: 27 km^{2} (10 sq mi)
- Elevation: 123 m (404 ft)

Population (2026)
  - Total: 5,088
  - Density: 190/km^{2} (490/sq mi)
- Demonym(s): Droati, sdrogi or droensi
- Time zone: UTC+1 (CET)
  - Summer (DST): UTC+2 (CEST)
- Postal code: 38074
- Dialing code: 0464
- Patron saint: Sant'Antonio (Dro), Santi Pietro e Paolo (Ceniga), Santa Lucia (Pietramurata)
- Website: Official website

Dro (Dró in local dialect) is a town and comune in Trentino in the northern Italian region of Trentino-Alto Adige/Südtirol. It sits in the deep Sarca river valley, and as of the 2021 census Dro had a population of 5,047. Dro is divided in two frazioni, Pietramurata and Ceniga.
