= List of people executed for witchcraft =

List of people from around the world executed over witchcraft

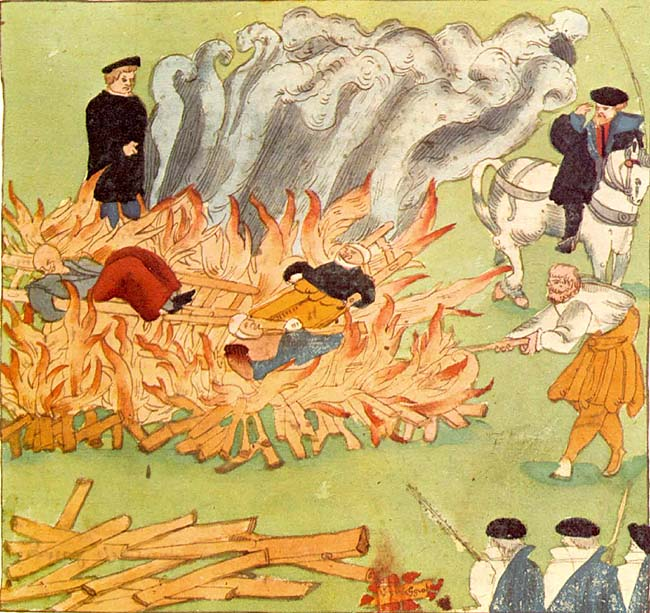
Artistic depiction of the execution by burning of three alleged witches in Baden, Switzerland in 1585

This is a list of people executed for witchcraft, many of whom were executed during organized witch-hunts, particularly during the 15th–18th centuries. Large numbers of people were prosecuted for witchcraft in Europe between 1560 and 1630.

== Background ==
Until around 1450, witchcraft-related prosecutions in Europe centered on maleficium, the concept of using supernatural powers specifically to harm others. Cases came about from accusations of the use of ritual magic to damage rivals. Until the early 15th century, there was little association of witchcraft with Satan. From that time organized witch-hunts increased, as did individual accusations of sorcery. The nature of the charges brought changed as more cases were linked to diabolism. Throughout the century, several treatises were published that helped to establish a stereotype of the witch, particularly the Satanic connection. During the 16th century, witchcraft prosecutions stabilized and even declined in some areas. Witch-hunts increased again in the 17th century. The witch trials in Early Modern Europe included the Basque witch trials in Spain, the Fulda witch trials in Germany, the North Berwick witch trials in Scotland, and the Torsåker witch trials in Sweden.

There were also witch-hunts during the 17th century in the American colonies. These were particularly common in the colonies of Massachusetts, Connecticut, and New Haven. The myth of the witch had a strong cultural presence in 17th century New England and, as in Europe, witchcraft was strongly associated with devil-worship. About eighty people were accused of practicing witchcraft in a witch-hunt that lasted throughout New England from 1647 to 1663. Thirteen women and two men were executed. The Salem witch trials followed in 1692–93, culminating in the executions of 20 people. Five others died in jail.

It has been estimated that tens of thousands of people were executed for witchcraft in Europe and the American colonies over several hundred years. The exact number is unknown, but modern conservative scholars estimate around 40,000–50,000. Scholar Carlo Ginzburg of the University of Bologna, in his work Night Battles, estimates the number between 3-4 million people. Common methods of execution for convicted witches were hanging, drowning and burning. Burning was often favored, particularly in Europe, as it was considered a more painful way to die. Prosecutors in English-speaking countries generally preferred hanging in cases of witchcraft.

== List of people executed for witchcraft ==
Name	Lifetime	Nationality	Death
Theoris of Lemnos	before 323 BC	Greek (Lemnos)	Unknown.
Petronilla de Meath	c. 1300–1324	Irish	Burned to death.
Stedelen	d. c. 1400	Swiss	Confessed under torture to summoning demons; burned to death and beheaded.
Kolgrim	c. d. 1407	Norse	Burned to death.
Matteuccia de Francesco	d. 1428	Italian	Confessed to having flown on the back of a demon; burned to death.
Agnes Bernauer	c. 1410–1435	German	Convicted of witchcraft and thrown in the Danube to drown, following accusations by her father-in-law Ernest, Duke of Bavaria.
Guirandana de Lay	d. 1461	Spanish	Woman accused of witchcraft; burned at the stake.
Gentile Budrioli	d. 1498, 14 July	Italian	Tortured and burned on the stake in Bologna.
Narbona Dacal	d. 1498	Spanish	Accused of witchcraft during the trial by the Inquisition. Burned at the stake.
Hatuey	d. 1512	Cuban	Accused of rebellion and witchcraft; burned at the stake in Baracoa, Cuba.
Emerenciane Lavayeèn	d. 1519	French	Accused of witchcraft; burned to death in Montpezat, France.
Janet, Lady Glamis	d. 1537	Scottish	Accused of witchcraft by King James V; burned to death.
Gyde Spandemager	d. 1543	Danish	Burned to death.
Lasses Birgitta	d. 1550	Swedish	The first woman executed for witchcraft in Sweden; beheaded.
Agnes Waterhouse	c. 1503–1566	English	The first woman executed for witchcraft in England; hanged.
Polissena of San Macario	d. 1571	Italian	Burned.
Janet Boyman	d. 1572	Scottish	Executed in 1572 for witchcraft
Gilles Garnier	d. 1573	French	Serial child murderer; convicted of witchcraft and lycanthropy, and burned to death.
Soulmother of Küssnacht	d. 1577	Swiss	Burned to death.
Violet Mar	d. 1577	Scottish	The trial of Violet Mar is believed to have influenced the views on witchcraft held by James VI of Scotland
Thomas Doughty	d. 1578	English	Nobleman and explorer accused by Sir Francis Drake of witchcraft, mutiny and treason; beheaded
Elizabeth Frauncis	d.1579	English	Accused of murdering her neighbour via sorcery. She had previously been tried and sentenced for witchcraft twice.
Elleine Smith	d.1579	English	Accused of bewitching her neighbour
Ursula Kemp	c. 1525–1582	English	Confessed to witchcraft and hanged.
Elisabeth Plainacher	1513–1583	Austrian	Only person to be executed for witchcraft in Vienna; burned to death.
Heikki Jauhopää	d. 1586	Finnish	Decapitated.
Walpurga Hausmannin	d. 1587	German	Midwife who confessed to child murder, witchcraft and vampirism; burned to death.
Ane Koldings	d. 1590	Danish	Burned to death.
Rebecca Lemp	d. 1590	German	One of 32 women convicted of witchcraft in a witch hunt in Nördlingen, burnt at the stake.
Anne Pedersdotter	d. 1590	Norwegian	Burned to death.
Kerstin Gabrielsdotter	d. 1590	Swedish	The only member of Swedish nobility to be charged with witchcraft; Unknown.
Cathelyne Van den Bulcke	d. 1590	Brabant	Burned to death.
Agnes Sampson	d. 1591	Scottish	Midwife, garrotted and burned to death during the North Berwick witch trials.
Marigje Arriens	c. 1520–1591	Dutch	Burned to death for sorcery.
Witches of Warboys	d. 1593	English	Alice Samuel and her family; hanged.
Allison Balfour	d. 1594	Scottish	Executed in Kirkwall
Gwen ferch Ellis	c.1542 – 1594	Welsh	The record of her trial is the earliest record of trial and execution on charges of witchcraft in Wales. She was first accused of Witchcraft in 1594. She was found guilty and hanged before the year's end at Denbigh town square in 1594.
Jean Delvaux	d. 1595	Stavelot-Malmedy	Roman Catholic monk; beheaded
Josyne van Beethoven	c. 1540–1595	Brabant	Burned at the stake.
Andrew Man	d. 1598	Scottish	Tried and burnt
Pappenheimer Family	d. 1600	German	Tortured and burned to death.
Henry Gardinn	d. 1605	Limburg	Burned at the stake.
Mary Pannal	d.1603	English	Unknown.
Tanneken Sconyncx	1560–1603	Flanders	Torture.
Merga Bien	1560s–1603	German	Convicted as part of the Fulda witch trials and burned to death.
Mechteld ten Ham	d. 1605	Dutch	Confessed under torture and was burned to death.
Nyzette Cheveron	d. 1605	Spanish Netherlands	Confessed to being a witch; was strangled and burned to death; Led to the execution of Anne Nouville.
Franziska Soder	d. 1606, October 8	Rheinfelden, Switzerland	Burned as a witch. Her husband paid 320 Gulden as "confiscation" to the Gentlemen' Chamber in Rheinfelden.
Elin i Horsnäs	d. 1611	Sweden	Beheaded after her second trial for witchcraft.
Alice Nutter	d. 1612	England	Hanged during Pendle witches hunt
Pendle witches	d. 1612	England	Unknown.
Evaline Gill	d. 1616	Scotland	Strangled; burned to death survived by 2 children moved to Singer Louisiana – Still living witch's Scalloway
Elspeth Reoch	d. 1616	Scotland	Executed in Kirkwall
Margaret Quaine	d. 1617	Isle of Man	Executed in Castletown, Isle of Man with her son, John Cubbon. Margaret's mother was also accused of Witchcraft several decades prior. Wiccan Priest Gerald Gardner erected a plaque in their memory on the Smelt Monument in Castletown Square.
Witches of Belvoir	d. 1618	England	A mother and two daughters, the daughters were hanged.
Sidonia von Borcke	1548–1620	Pomerania	Confessed to murder and witchcraft under torture; beheaded, corpse burned.
Birthe Olufsdatter	d. 1620	Denmark	Executed. Confessed herself guilty of sorcery
Christenze Kruckow	1558–1621	Denmark-Norway	Noblewoman who confessed to cursing the marital bed of a rival; beheaded.
Elizabeth Sawyer	1572-1621	England	Poor woman executed at Tyburn.
Anne de Chantraine	1601–1622	France	Strangled and then burned at the stake.
Rhydderch ap Ifan, Lowri ferch Ifan, and Agnes ferch Ifan	1622 (date of execution)	Wales	Indicted for felonious witchcraft at Caernarfon. It’s claimed that they were responsible for the death and bewitchment of Marged Huws of Llanbedrog. Though they pleaded not guilty, they were found guilty and hanged.
Jón Rögnvaldsson	d. 1625	Iceland under Danish rule	Burned to death.
Luís de la Penha	1581–1626	Portugal	Burned to death.
Katharina Henot	1570–1627	Cologne	Postmistress; burned to death.
Johannes Junius	1573–1628	Holy Roman Empire	The mayor of Bamberg who was accused of hosting a witches' Sabbat and engaging in sexual intercourse with a succubus. Subjected to repeated torture and burned to death during the Bamberg witch trials
Georg Haan	d. 1628	Holy Roman Empire	Sued Prince Bishop Johann Georg Fuchs von Dornheim in 1627 and left for Speyer. Shortly after he left, his wife and daughter were accused and burned. Upon his return in 1628 he was executed for witchcraft in the Bamberg witch trials
Kempfin	d. 1629-1630	Holy Roman Empire	Accused by 13 witnesses of putting a 'frost' on the wine and grain crop during the Bamberg witch trials
Urbain Grandier	1590–1634	France	Convicted following the Loudun possessions and burned to death.
Johann Albrecht Adelgrief	d. 1636	Royal Prussia	Executed after claiming to be a prophet.
Kongla Ann	d 1640	Estonia	Burned to death.
Maren Spliid	c. 1600–1641	Denmark	Burned to death.
Elizabeth Clarke	c. 1565–1645	England	The first woman persecuted by the Witchfinder General, Matthew Hopkins; hanged.
Agnes Finnie	d. 1645	Scotland	Executed on the Castle Hill of Edinburgh
Adrienne d'Heur	1585–1646	France	Burned to death.
Alse Young	c. 1600–1647	Connecticut Colony	The first person recorded to have been executed for witchcraft in the American colonies; hanged.
Margaret Jones	d. 1648	Massachusetts Bay Colony	The first person to be executed for witchcraft in Massachusetts Bay Colony; hanged.
Mary Barnes	c. 1631-Jan 1663	Connecticut Colony	The last person to be executed for witchcraft, along with Nathaniel and Rebecca Elson Greensmith, in Hartford, CT
Alice Lake	1620–c. 1650	Massachusetts Bay Colony	Wife of Henry Lake; hanged in Massachusetts.
Mrs. Kendall	c. 1650	Massachusetts Bay Colony	Hanged at Cambridge, Massachusetts.
Elizabeth Bassett	born. 1651	Massachusetts Bay Colony	Accused but not executed because she was pregnant. (Husband John Proctor Jr was executed for being a Witch) Elizabeth died sometime after 1703. The cause is unknown but not from Witch trials.
Jeane Gardiner	d. 1651	Bermuda	Executed in Bermuda.
Michée Chauderon	d. 1652	Switzerland	Confessed under torture to summoning demons and was the last person executed for sorcery in Geneva.
Goodwife Knapp	d. 1653	Connecticut Colony	Hanged at Fairfield, Connecticut.
Katherine Grady	d. 1654	England	Accused of being a witch, tried, found guilty, and hanged aboard an English ship en route to Virginia from England.
Marged ferch Rhisiart (Margaret ferch Richard)	1655 (date of execution)	Wales	Indicted for bewitching Gwen Meredith. It’s said that Gwen fell ill and died at the end of December. Marged pleaded not guilty but was found guilty and sent to her death by hanging in 1655 outside Beaumaris courthouse, Ynys Môn.
Ann Hibbins	d. 1656	Massachusetts Bay Colony	The fourth person executed for witchcraft in Massachusetts Bay Colony; hanged on Boston Common
Marketta Punasuomalainen	1600s–1658	Swedish Finland	Cunning woman, burned to death.
Ursula Corbet	d. March 14, 1661	England Worcester	Accused of being a witch, tried, found guilty of poisoning her husband of three weeks. Known as the white witch of Worcester who lived at Defford, near Pershore.
Daniel Vuil	d. 1661	New France	Shot with muskets on October 7, 1661. He was accused of causing the demonic possession of a girl, although his Protestantism and selling alcohol to the First Nations people were also factors. The only person to be executed for witchcraft in New France.
Alloa witches	d. 1634-1662	Scotland	Cause of death largely undocumented. One of the accused, Margaret Duchill, was burned to death.
Anna Roleffes	c. 1600-1663	Brunswick-Lüneburg	Decapitated and burned on December 30, 1663. She was one of the last witches to be executed in Braunschweig, Germany and the complete account of her trial still exists. She is better known as Tempel Anneke.
Goodwife Greensmith	d. 1663	Connecticut Colony	Hanged at Hartford, Connecticut
Isabella Rigby	d. 1666	England	Believed to be the last person hanged for witchcraft in Lancashire.
Grissel Jaffray	d. 1669	Scotland	Last person to be executed for witchcraft in Dundee. Burned to death.
Lisbeth Nypan	c. 1610–1670	Denmark-Norway	Cunning woman accused of making people sick to earn money; burned to death.
Thomas Weir	1599–1670	Scotland	Strangled and burned to death.
Janet Macmurdoch	d. 1671	Scotland	Strangled and burned to death.
Elin i Staxäng	d. 1671	Sweden	Tried three times, beheaded and burned.
Märet Jonsdotter	1644–1672	Sweden	Beheaded
Anna Zippel	d. 1676	Sweden	Beheaded for abducting children.
Brita Zippel	d. 1676	Sweden	Beheaded for sorcery.
Malin Matsdotter	1613–1676	Sweden	Burned to death.
Rachel Flemynge/Fleming	1678 (date of death)	Wales	First accused of witchcraft in 1668 at Glamorgan. Accused further of witchcraft practices, sentenced to death by burning, but died on the day of her execution.
Anne Løset	d. 1679	Denmark-Norway	Burned to death.
Peronne Goguillon	d. 1679	France	Burned to death; one of the last women to be executed for witchcraft in France.
Catherine Deshayes	c. 1640–1680	France	Also known as La Voisin; burned to death following the Affair of the Poisons
Antti Tokoi	d.1682	Swedish Finland	Accused and convicted of witchcraft, blasphemy, disgracing priests, and healing.
Martha van Wetteren	1646–1676	Flanders	Last person to be executed for witchcraft in the Spanish Netherlands.
Ann Glover	d. 1688	Massachusetts Bay Colony	Last person hanged for witchcraft in Boston.
Alice Parker	d. 1692	Massachusetts Bay Colony	Hanged during the Salem witch trials.
Ann Pudeator	d. 1692	Massachusetts Bay Colony	Hanged during the Salem witch trials.
Bridget Bishop	c. 1632–1692	Massachusetts Bay Colony	The first person to be tried and executed during the Salem witch trials.
Elizabeth Howe	1635–1692	Massachusetts Bay Colony	Hanged during the Salem witch trials.
George Burroughs	c. 1650–1692	Massachusetts Bay Colony	Congregational pastor, executed as part of the Salem witch trials.
George Jacobs	1620–1692	Massachusetts Bay Colony	Hanged during the Salem witch trials.
Giles Corey	c. 1611–1692	Massachusetts Bay Colony	Crushed to death for refusing to plead during the Salem witch trials. See peine forte et dure.
John Proctor	c. 1632–1692	Massachusetts Bay Colony	Hanged during the Salem witch trials.
John Willard	c. 1672–1692	Massachusetts Bay Colony	Hanged during the Salem witch trials.
Margaret Scott	d. 1692	Massachusetts Bay Colony	Hanged during the Salem witch trials.
Martha Carrier	d. 1692, August 19	Massachusetts Bay Colony	Hanged during the Salem witch trials; her children had claimed she was a witch while undergoing torture.
Martha Corey	1620s–1692	Massachusetts Bay Colony	Hanged during the Salem witch trials
Mary Eastey	1634–1692	Massachusetts Bay Colony	Hanged during the Salem witch trials
Mary Parker	d. 1692	Massachusetts Bay Colony	Hanged during the Salem witch trials.
Rebecca Nurse	1621–1692	Massachusetts Bay Colony	Hanged during the Salem witch trials
Sarah Good	1655–1692	Massachusetts Bay Colony	One of the first to be convicted in the Salem witch trials.
Samuel Wardwell	1643–1692	Massachusetts Bay Colony	Hanged during the Salem witch trials.
Sarah Wildes	1627–1692	Massachusetts Bay Colony	Hanged during the Salem witch trials.
Susannah Martin	1621–1692	Massachusetts Bay Colony	Hanged during the Salem witch trials.
Wilmot Redd	1600s–1692	Massachusetts Bay Colony	Hanged during the Salem witch trials.
Mima Renard	d. 1692	Portuguese Brazil	Prostitute, was accused by popular belief to bewitch men; burned to death.
Anne Palles	1619–1693	Denmark-Norway	The last person officially executed for witchcraft in Denmark; beheaded.
Viola Cantini	1668–1693	Italy	Burned to death on May 10, 1693, after caught performing vampirism on her dying son and cursing members of the village.
Paisley witches	d. 1697	Scotland	Also known as the Bargarran witches, the last mass execution for witchcraft in western Europe.
Elspeth McEwen	d. 1698	Scotland	Strangled then burned at the stake.
Anna Eriksdotter	1624–1704	Sweden	The last person executed for sorcery in Sweden.
Laurien Magee	1689-1710	Ireland	Burnt at the stake as part of the Islandmagee witch trial.
Janet Horne	d. 1727	Scotland	Last British person to be executed for sorcery; burned to death.
Catherine Repond	1662–1731	Switzerland	Strangled and burned to death.
Helena Curtens	1722–1738	Electoral Palatinate	One of the last people to be executed for witchcraft in Germany.
Bertrand Guilladot	d. 1742	France	Priest who confessed to having made a pact with the devil
Maria Renata Saenger von Mossau	1680–1749	Bavaria	One of the last to be executed for witchcraft in Germany.
Maria Pauer	1730s–1750	Austria	Last person executed for witchcraft in Austria; beheaded.
Ruth Osborne	1680–1751	England	Murdered by an unruly mob during a "trial by ducking".
Ursulina de Jesus	d. 1754	Portuguese Brazil	Accused of removing her husband's virility to avoid having children; burned to death.
María Pujol	d. 1767	Spain	The last person to be executed for witchcraft in Catalonia and any other region of Spain.
Anna Göldi	d. 1782	Switzerland	Beheaded; last person to be executed for witchcraft in Europe
Maria da Conceição	d. 1798	Portuguese Brazil	Accused and convicted of witchcraft to produce medicines and potions to attract men.
Leatherlips	1732–1810	Wyandot people	Native American leader, sentenced to death for witchcraft and executed by tomahawk.
Barbara Zdunk	1769–1811	Prussian Poland	Burned to death.
Ngema Makhemu	d. 2000, October	South Africa	Accused of witchcraft and burned to death by lynch mob, along with housemates Mbhejile Sibiya, Hlengiwe Ntuli, Samukelisiwe Masikane, Khanyisane Ngema, and Siyabonga Masikane.
Ama Hemmah	d. 2010	Ghana	Accused of being a witch; burned to death.
Amina bint Abdulhalim Nassar	d. 2011, December	Saudi Arabia	Public execution by beheading
Muree bin Ali Al Asiri	d. 2012, June	Saudi Arabia	Public execution by beheading
Ahmed Kusane Hassan	d. 2020, September	Somalia	Public execution by firing squad
Sangweni Jostina	d. 2021, April	South Africa	Brutally beaten and burned alive. (3).
Solani Mchunu	18 June 2023	South Africa	Strangled to death.
Unidentified 85 year old woman	12 February 2024	South Africa	Target of an arson attack.
Dugulu Purti (husband) Suku Horo (wife) Daskir Purti (daughter)	12 October 2024	India	Stripped, beaten with sticks, stabbed to death with sharp weapons.
Six unidentified people	2 July 2025	Burundi	6 people killed at Gasarara Hill, including 2 burned alive.

== Images ==
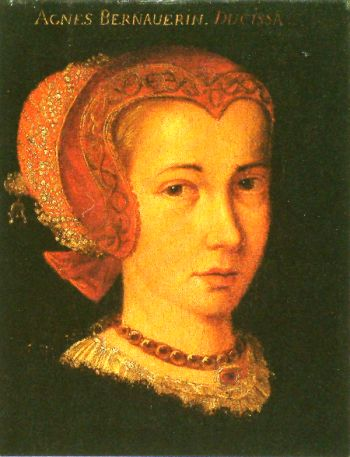
Agnes Bernauer, executed in 1435

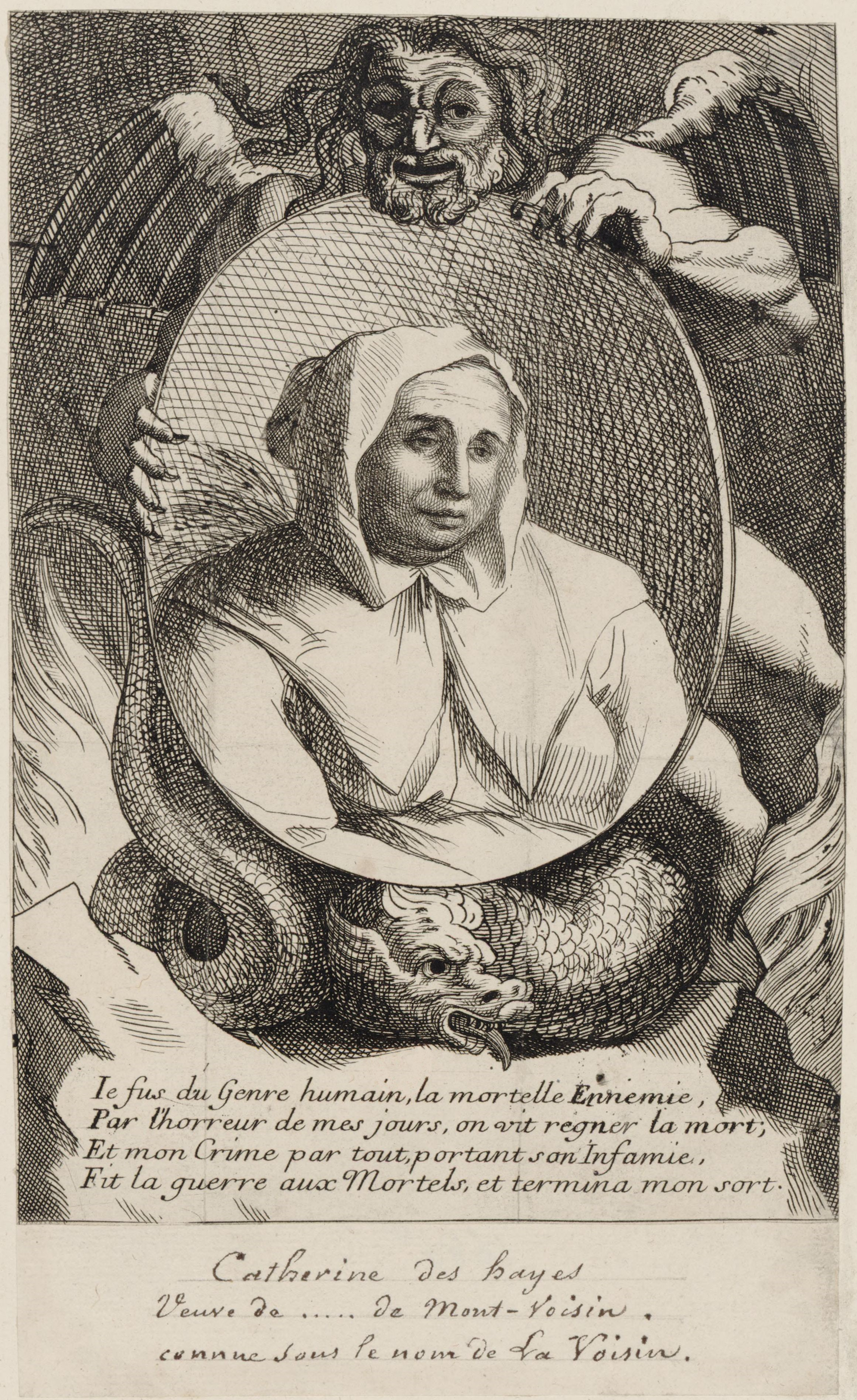
Catherine Deshayes aka La Voisin, executed in 1680

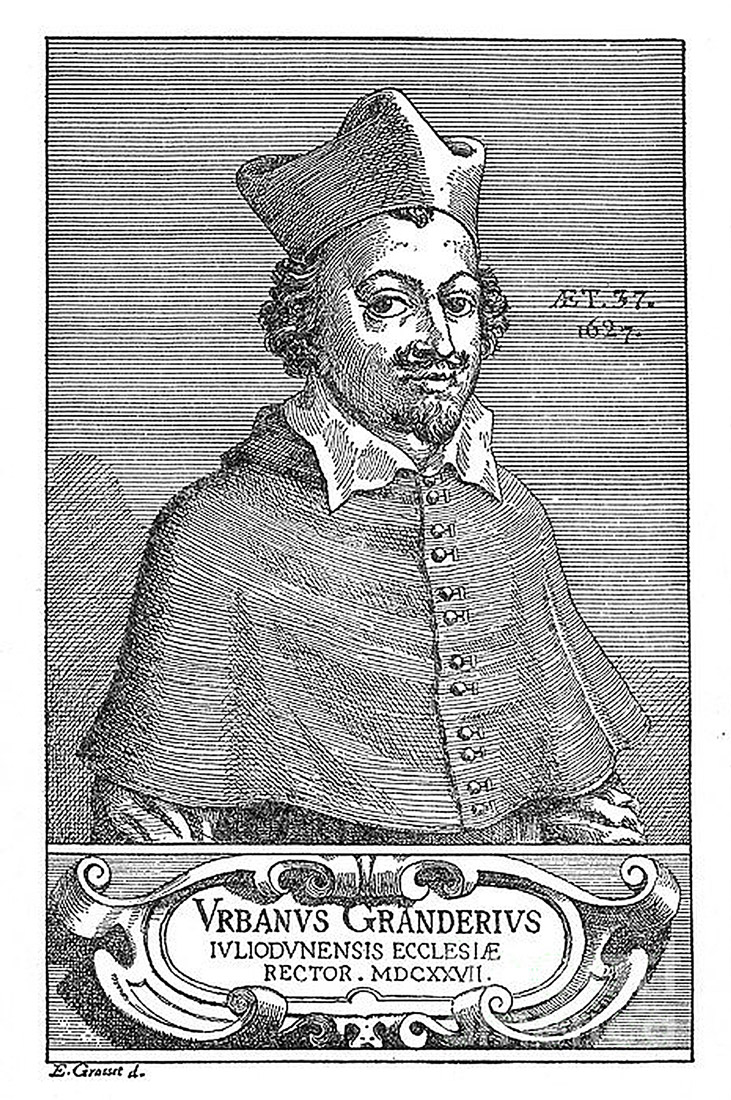
Urbain Grandier, executed in 1634

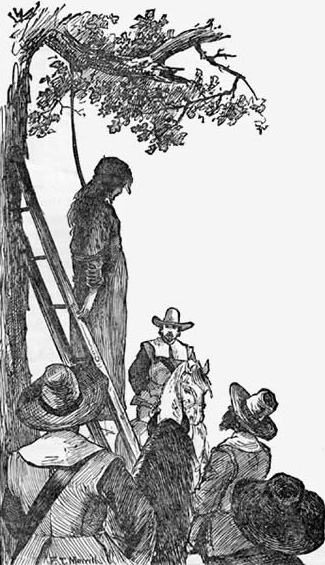
Execution of Ann Hibbins on Boston Common, June 19, 1656. Sketch by F.T. Merril, 1886

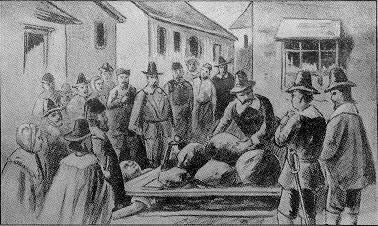
Giles Corey being crushed to death, 1692

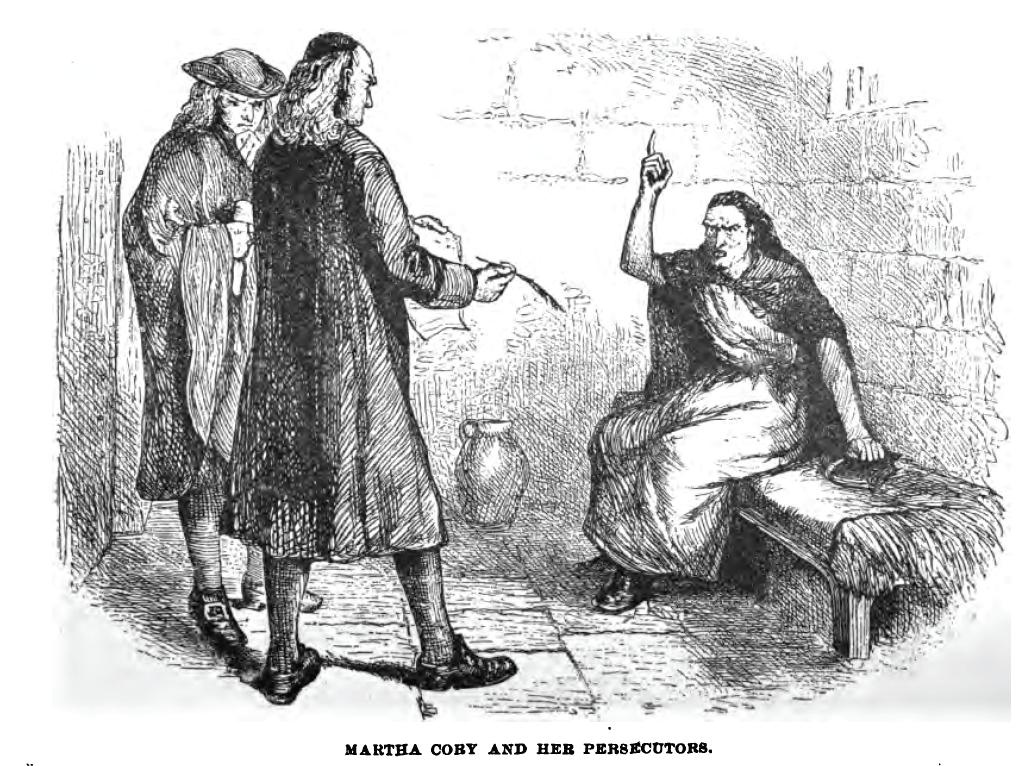
Martha Corey was executed in 1692

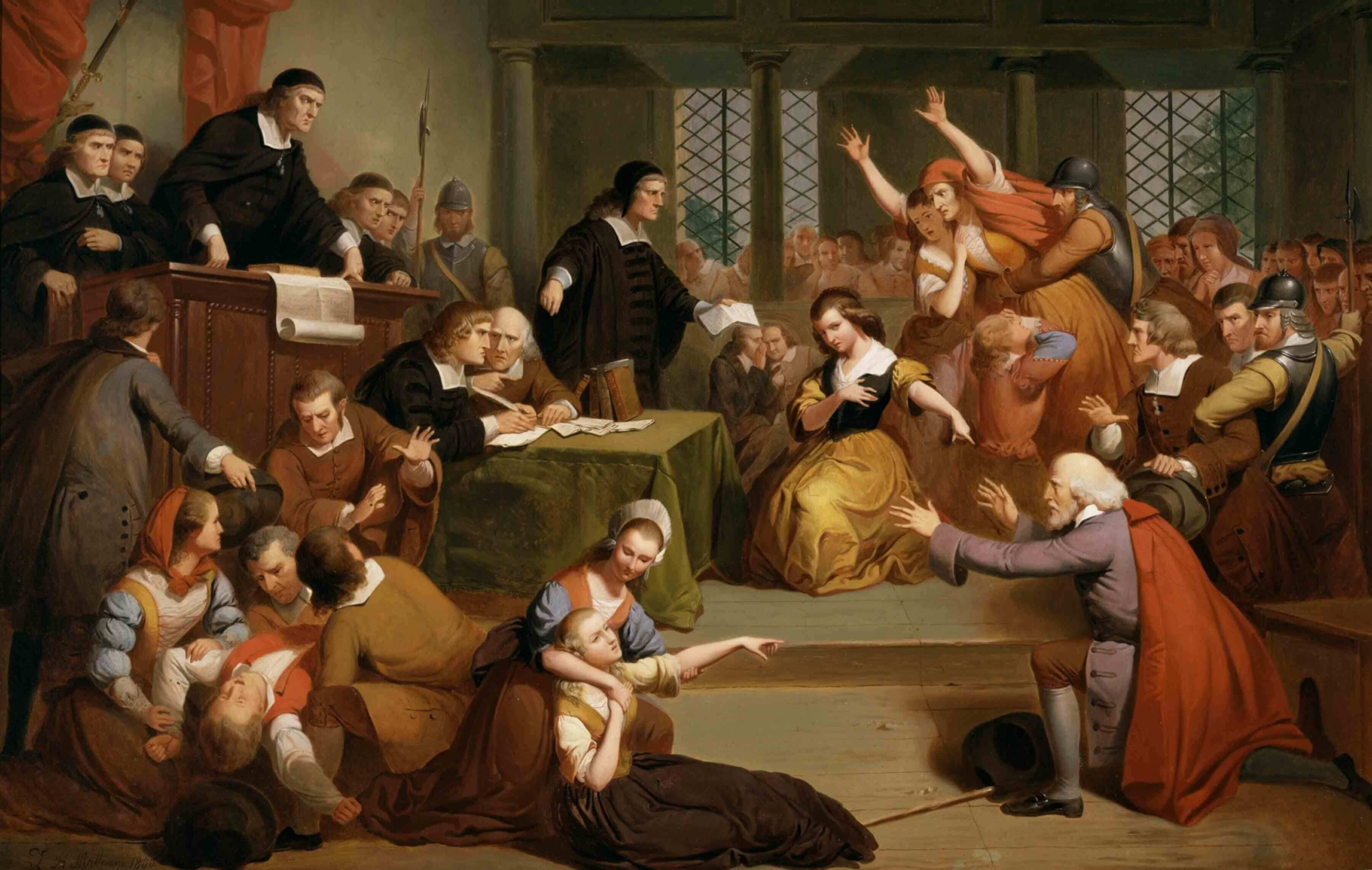
The Trial of George Jacobs who was executed in 1692. Painting by Thompkins Matteson, 1855

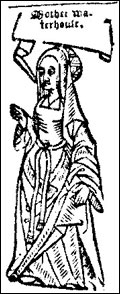
Agnes Waterhouse was executed in Chelmsford, England in 1566

== See also ==
- Laws against witchcraft

== Notes ==
1. According to Kors & Peters, modern scholars place the number of executions for witchcraft at no greater than 50,000. According to Merriman, some estimates are higher. Levack multiplied the number of known European witch trials by the average rate of conviction and execution, to arrive at a figure of around 60,000 deaths. Barstow adjusted Levack's estimate to account for lost records, estimating 100,000 deaths. Many were burned by the stake, decapitated, and tortured in various ways. Hutton argues that Levack's estimate had already been adjusted for these, and revises the figure to approximately 40,000.
