= Balthasar von Dernbach =

Benedictine monk (1570-1606)

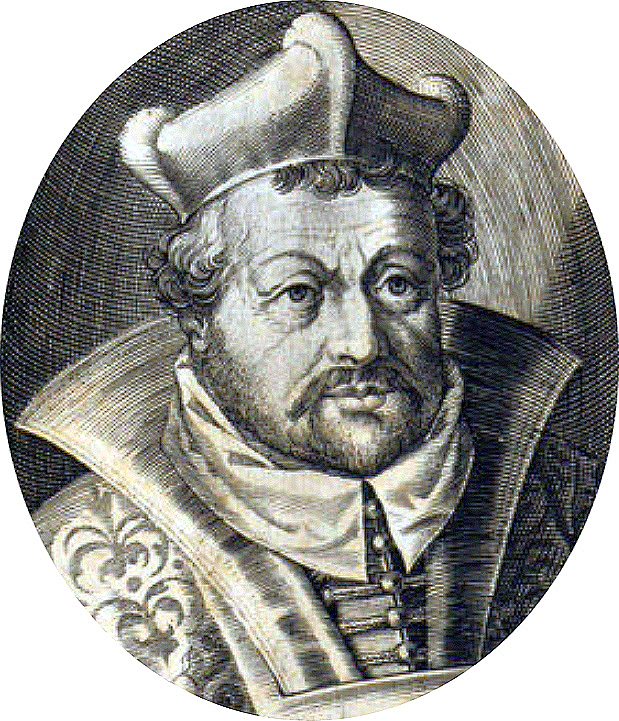
Prince-abbot Balthasar von Dernbach

Balthasar von Dernbach (1548 – 15 March 1606), was a Benedictine monk of Fulda monastery and its Prince-Abbot from 1570 to 1606.

== Family ==
Balthasar was born into a branch (called Graul) of the von Dernbach family, a family of knights traceable to the 13th century in the vicinity of Giessen and Herborn as liegemen of the landgraves of Hesse. Born in 1548 in Wiesenfeld, Hesse, Balthasar was the youngest son of the fifteen children of Peter von Dernbach and his wife, Klara (née Klauer von und zu Wohra). Balthasar was baptized into the Lutheran church, although his father's religious leanings have been described as either "staunchly Lutheran" and the "only Catholic" in Hesse. A liegeman of Philip I, Landgrave of Hesse, Peter von Dernbach fought in the Schmalkaldic War of 1546/47 despite reportedly holding a critical attitude towards Philip's religious policies.

== Fulda monastery ==
When Balthasar's father died in 1560, his mother sent the 12-year-old youth to Fulda monastery, where her brother, Wilhelm Hartmann Klauer von und zu Wohra, was prince-abbot. There, Balthasar was raised a Catholic, In 1566, he was ordained a priest in Würzburg. In 1570, he was elected his uncle's successor as prince-abbot and confirmed in that position by Pope Pius V. As abbot, Balthasar helped his brothers Otto, Melchior, and Wilhelm attain high office. Otto became marshal-provost at Petersberg, Melchior a marshal-bailiff at Brückenau, and Wilhelm became commander of the Teutonic Knights at Kapfenburg und Oettingen. Melchior's son, Peter Philip, entered the service of the Prince-Bishopric of Bamberg and later became Prince-Bishop of Bamberg and Würzburg.

== Counter-Reformation ==
Balthasar immediately adopted a policy of counterreformation. In 1571, he called in the Jesuits to found a school and college. He insisted that the members of the chapter should return to a monastic form of life. Whereas his predecessors had tolerated Protestantism, resulting in most of the citizenry of Fulda and a large portion of the principality's countryside professing Lutheranism, Balthasar ordered his subjects either to return to the Catholic faith or leave his territories.

== Exile and return ==
These measures were resisted by the chapter, the magistrates, and the knights. After Balthasar repeatedly ignored threats of violence, the knights allied themselves to Julius Echter von Mespelbrunn, prince-bishop of neighbouring Würzburg. In 1576, the combined opposition forced Balthasar at Hammelburg to sign a letter of abdication and made Echter von Mespelbrunn administrator on the condition that he would tolerate the knights' religion. Balthasar fled to the Archbishop of Mainz, who gave him Castle Bieberstein as residence.

Balthasar revoked his abdication and sent complaints to Emperor Maximilian II and Pope Gregory XIII to be reinstated. The Pope threatened Echter von Mespelbrunn with excommunication if he refused to relinquish his claim to Fulda, but the latter insisted on the matter being settled by lawsuit, which would last more than a quarter century. During his years of banishment, von Dernbach directed his care and attention to the seminary at Fulda established by Pope Gregory XIII for students of noble birth. Balthasar effected the creation of sixty additional free places for the needy sons of burghers. In 1602, the Aulic Council reinstated Balthasar and sentenced the chapter, the knights and the cities to pay a fine and the expenses of the proceedings. Upon his return, 26 years later, Balthasar continued his policy of counter-reformation and achieved a complete restoration of Catholicism in the city and the principality.

== Witch trials ==
After 1602, he ordered witch trials. These were presided over by Balthasar Nuss, who had attached himself to the abbot during his exile and now was appointed Zentgraf of Hofbiebe and Malefizmeister. These trials resulted in the deaths of approximately 250 people. After Balthasar's death in 1606, Nuss was arrested by the new prince-abbot, Johann Friedrich von Schwalbach, and spent 12 years in prison before being beheaded in 1618. Merga Bien, a woman convicted of witchcraft, was the most famous of the victims in the Fulda witch trials.

== Literature ==
- Wolfgang Breul in: 200 Jahre evangelische Gemeinde in Fulda. = 200 Jahre evangelische Kirchengemeinde in Fulda. Evangelische Gemeinde, Fulda 2003, S. 15–26.
- Heinrich Heppe: Die Restauration des Katholizismus in Fulda, auf dem Eichsfelde und in Würzburg, Elwert, Marburg 1850
- Josef Leinweber: Die Fuldaer Äbte und Bischöfe. Knecht, Frankfurt am Main 1989; ISBN 3-7820-0585-6

Catholic Church titles
Preceded by Wilhelm Hartmann Klauer zu Wohra	Prince-Abbot of Fulda; 1570–1606	Succeeded by Johann Friedrich von Schwalbach
