= Walpurga Hausmännin =

German Witch

Walpurga Hausmännin (died 1587 in Dillingen an der Donau, Bavaria) was a German midwife executed for witchcraft, vampirism, and child murder. The confession she made under torture exemplifies the classical relationship between witch and devil later commonly used in several witch trials.

== Background ==
An elderly widow, Walpurga had worked as a licensed midwife in the city of Dillingen for 19 years when she was arrested and accused of sorcery. During torture, she made a long series of confessions. In 1556, when she, as a newly made widow, had worked in the field of the city, she had made arrangements to meet a male coworker for sex in her cottage later in the evening. But he had not arrived; instead, a demon had come dressed in his clothes. They had sex, and the night after, he returned and promised to save her from poverty.

During her confession, she stated that she had sworn herself to Satan and written it on a contract, and the demon, called Federlin, had then taken her to the real Devil, and confirmed her contract, after which they had drunk wine, eaten roasted babies and had sex (she with Federlin). Afterwards, Federlin had given her an ointment, which she had used to hurt people, children and harvests. Since then, she had often visited the Devil, and her demon lover Federlin often visited her and had sex with her, even in the streets at night and in prison. He left every time she said the Name of Jesus, which is also exemplary for these relations and something she had in common with Johannes Junius.

She confessed to having murdered forty children during her work as a midwife before they were baptized, by the method of applying a special salve or of putting pressure on their foreheads, and to having sucked their blood like a vampire. She confessed to having killed children and animals with an oil, and had eaten the children with other witches and used their hair for sorcery.

Both the local authorities - the church under the bishop in Augsburg and the imperial court - sentenced her to death. Her property was confiscated. She was taken through the city, and stopped five times before they reached the place of execution. At the first stop, they tore her left breast and right arm with irons, the second stop, they tore her right breast; the third, they tore the left arm; the fourth stop, at the place of execution, the left hand. On the place of execution, her right hand, with which she had made her oath as a midwife, was cut off, after which she was burned alive at the stake. After she had been burnt, her ashes were not allowed to remain on the ground, but were scooped up and dumped in a stream.

== See also ==
- Pappenheimer Family
- Merga Bien

== Bibliography ==
- Biodata of Walpurga Hausmannin
- Profile: Walpurga Hausmannin

== Sources ==
- Brian Pavlac: Witch Hunts in the Western World: Persecution and Punishment from the Inquisition through the Salem Trials
- Ashley, Leonard R. N:The Complete Book of Devils and Demons. New York: Barricade Books Inc.(1996)
