= Laws against witchcraft =

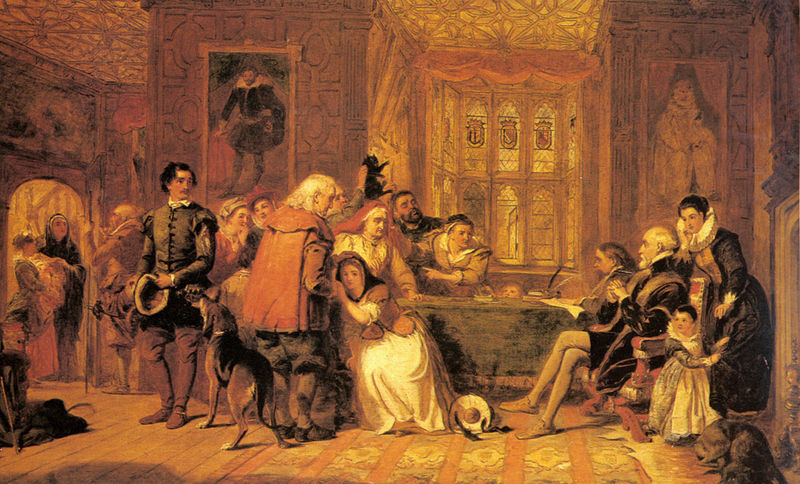
The Witch Trial by William Powell Frith (1848)

Through history multiple countries prohibited witchcraft and practices that are perceived to be related including fortune-telling, faith-healing etc., including with the penalty of death.

== Historical laws ==
=== Ancient times ===
==== Code of Hammurabi ====
Second article of the Code of Hammurabi stated:

If anyone accuses someone else of sorcery, the accused shall jump into a river, and if they drown the accuser shall take possession of the accused's house and their belongings.

==== Code of Ur-Nammu ====
Article 13 stated:

If a man is accused of sorcery [translation disputed], he must undergo ordeal by water; if he is proven innocent, his accuser must pay 3 shekels.

==== Hittite laws ====
Code of the Nesilim had one paragraph prescribing unspecified penalty:

[If] anyone forms clay for [an image] (for magical purposes), it is sorcery and a case for the king's court.

==== Assyrian law ====
If a man or a woman practice sorcery, and they be caught with it in their hands, they shall prosecute them, they shall convict them. The practicer of magic they shall put to death.

==== Old Testament ====
Laws prohibiting various forms of witchcraft and divination can be found in the books of Exodus, Leviticus and Deuteronomy. These include the following (as translated in the Revised JPS, 2023:

- Exodus 22:18 – "You shall not tolerate a sorceress [Biblical Hebrew: מְכַשֵּׁפָ֖ה, romanized: mək̲aššēp̄ā]."
- Leviticus 19:26 – "You shall not eat anything with its blood. You shall not practice divination or soothsaying [תְנַחֲשׁ֖וּ וְלֹ֥א תְעוֹנֵֽנוּ tənaḥăšu wəlo t̲əʿonēnu]."
- Leviticus 20:27 – "A man or a woman who has a ghost or a familiar spirit [א֛וֹב א֥וֹ יִדְּעֹנִ֖י ob̲ o yiddəʿoni] shall be put to death; they shall be pelted with stones—and the bloodguilt is theirs."
- Deuteronomy 18:10-11 – "Let no one be found among you who consigns a son or daughter to the fire, or who is an augur, a soothsayer, a diviner, a sorcerer, one who casts spells, or one who consults ghosts or familiar spirits, or one who inquires of the dead [דֹרֵ֖שׁ אֶל־הַמֵּתִֽים dorēš el-hammēt̲im]."

=== United Kingdom ===
Religious tensions in England during the 16th and 17th centuries resulted in the introduction of serious penalties for witchcraft. Henry VIII's Witchcraft Act 1541 (33 Hen. 8. c. 8) was the first act to define witchcraft as a felony, a crime punishable by death and the forfeiture of goods and chattels.

The Witchcraft Act 1735 (9 Geo. 2 c. 5) marked a complete reversal in attitudes. Penalties for the practice of witchcraft as traditionally constituted, which by that time was considered by many influential figures to be an impossible crime, were replaced by penalties for the pretence of witchcraft. A person who claimed to have the power to call up spirits, or foretell the future, or cast spells, or discover the whereabouts of stolen goods, was to be punished as a vagrant and a con artist, subject to fines and imprisonment. The Act applied to the whole of Great Britain, repealing both the 1563 Scottish act and the 1604 English act.

The Witchcraft Act 1735 remained in force in Britain well into the 20th century, until its eventual repeal with the enactment of the Fraudulent Mediums Act 1951 (14 & 15 Geo. 6. c. 33).

The Fraudulent Mediums Act 1951 was repealed on 26 May 2008 by new Consumer Protection Regulations following an EU directive targeting unfair sales and marketing practices.

=== Russian Empire ===
In the church council of 1551, the Russian Orthodox church asked Czar Ivan the Terrible to persecute Paganism and introduce the death penalty for pagans such as the sorcerers, astrologers and fortune tellers, and allow for the church to banish them and the secular courts to execute them. Ivan the Terrible did not introduce the death penalty for sorcery, but he banned the use of magic and authorized secular courts to prosecute it as a crime. In a Decree of 1648, the Tsar Alexis of Russia introduced the death penalty for all form of Paganism such as sorcery, and a new Decree in 1653 specified that the penalty was to be death by burning.

Tsar Peter the Great kept the death penalty for sorcery in the law of 1716. In 1731, empress Anna of Russia legally redefined sorcery as a form of fraud, but did not remove the death penalty as the punishment for this type of fraud. Empress Catherine the Great made it clear after her accession to the throne that the death penalty should no longer be used against people convicted of the fraud of sorcery, and from 1775 formally transferred the crime to be handled only by a so-called trial of conscience, sovestnye sudy, which dealt with insignificant crimes such as superstition. The last attested witch trials in Russia occurred in the 1860s.

=== Sweden ===
Magic was legalized gradually in Sweden. Witchcraft which was punishable with death was removed from penal code in 1779. Fortune-telling and magical healing was a crime of superstition until 1864, when it was reframed as a crime of fraud which it remained until 1942.

=== Denmark ===
In 1686, the local courts were banned from performing executions without confirmation from the national high court. The final person to be legally executed for sorcery in Denmark was the grenadier Johan Pistorius, in 1722. The laws against witchcraft were only repealed in 1866.

=== Nazi Germany ===
In 1934 Nazis outlawed fortune telling making publication of any almanacs or astrological journals illegal.

=== Australia ===
New South Wales adopted the British The Witchcraft Act 1735 before finally repealing it in 1969. New South Wales repealed laws against fortune telling in 1979.

=== Canada ===
Canada repealed its Witchcraft Act in 2018.

=== New Zealand ===
While still applying the 1735 Witchcraft Act New Zealand passed the Tohunga Suppression Act 1907 banning local faith healers. The Act was repealed by the Maori Welfare Act, 1962. The Witchcraft Act was repealed in 1961 with the passage of Crimes Act.

=== United States ===
States and municipalities that used to have laws against fortune telling include: Michigan (1931 – 1993), Terrebonne Parish, Louisiana (1971 – 2000), Petoskey, Michigan (?–2022), Huntington, West Virginia (?–2024), Savannah, Georgia (1945 – 1974, license now required), Front Royal, Virginia (?–2014), Norfolk, Virginia (1979 – 2024).

== Modern laws ==
Witchcraft-related laws by country: Practice of magic is illegal Using witchcraft against another person is illegal Accusing someone of being a witch is illegal Pretending to be a witch and accusing someone of being a witch is illegal Practice of fortune-telling is illegal Law repealed

As of June 2025, the following countries have provisions in their laws prohibiting witchcraft or using witchcraft against another person: Algeria, Cameroon, Central African Republic, Vanuatu, Solomon Islands, Fiji, Benin, Côte d'Ivoire and Gambia. Pretending to be a witch or accusing someone of being a witch is considered illegal in Botswana, Eswatini, Kenya, Malawi, Namibia, Nigeria, Papua New Guinea, South Africa, Tanzania, Uganda, Zambia, Zimbabwe. Indonesia, Solomon Islands, United Arab Emirates, Bahrain (since 2010), Qatar (since 2015), Libya (House of Representatives, since 2024), Afghanistan and Brunei ban the use of "supernatural powers", "magic", or "black magic". The following countries only prohibit accusing someone of being a witch: Democratic Republic of the Congo, India (state laws), Nepal.

=== Afghanistan ===
Since Taliban came to power they introduced death penalty for "sorcery".

=== Australia ===
Fortune-telling remains a crime in the Northern Territory and South Australia.

=== Saudi Arabia ===
In 2011 Saudi Arabia executed Muree bin Ali Al Asiri for sorcery and witchcraft after he was found in possession of books and talismans.

Also in 2011, Amina bint Abdul Halim bin Salem Nasser was executed by beheading for the crimes of 'witchcraft and sorcerery'.

=== Cameroon ===
Article 251 of the Cameroon Penal Code provides a penalty from two to 10 years for using witchcraft against another person. When use of witchcraft results in a person's death, the penalty is life in prison.

=== Central African Republic ===
According to the 2009 penal code witchcraft is a criminal offense in the Central African Republic punishable by five to 10 years in prison and a fine ranging from 100,000 CFA to 1,000,000 CFA ($200 to $2,000). Until 2009 witchcraft was punishable by death. Nearly 60% of women held in the Bimbo women’s prison in Bangui between January 2020 and June 2021 were charged with witchcraft offenses. The average age of accused person is 55.

=== India ===
In 2001 the state of Jharkhand passed the Witch Hunting Practices Act which prohibited accusing someone of being a witch. Other states with similar laws include Bihar, Odisha, Chhattisgarh, Assam, Rajasthan, Maharashtra and Karnataka.

=== New Zealand ===
Section 16 of New Zealand's Summary Offences Act 1981 provides a one thousand dollar penalty for anyone who sets out to "deceive or pretend" for financial recompense that they possess telepathy or clairvoyance or acts as a medium for money through use of "fraudulent devices." However, it is not a criminal offence if it is solely intended for purposes of entertainment.

=== Nigeria ===
The Criminal Code Act of Nigeria bans fortune-telling as a form of witchcraft. Any person who "undertakes to tell fortunes" may be found guilty of a misdemeanor and imprisoned up to one year.

=== Pakistan ===
In 2025 a law was proposed in Pakistan banning black magic. In January 2026 the law was passed by the senate.

=== Tajikistan ===
Since 2008 fortune telling has been illegal in Tajikistan.

=== South Africa ===
The Witchcraft Suppression Bill was introduced in Parliament in January 1957 by Charles Robberts Swart, the Minister of Justice. It was intended to consolidate the existing laws on witchcraft and to increase the penalties applied. The act was very similar to the Cape Colony's Witchcraft Suppression Act of 1895, which had remained in force in the Cape Province until 1957. In 1970 the act was amended to add one offence and to replace fines denominated in pounds with fines denominated in rand.

The following three crimes attract a fine of up to R200,000 or imprisonment for up to five years or both.

- Employing or soliciting any witch doctor, witch-finder or any other person to name or indicate any person as a wizard.
- Professing a knowledge of witchcraft, or the use of charms, and advising any person how to bewitch, injure or damage any person or thing, or supplying any person with any pretended means of witchcraft.
- On the advice of any witch doctor, witch-finder or other person or on the ground of any pretended knowledge of witchcraft, using or causing to be put into operation any means or process which, in accordance with such advice or the accused's own belief, is calculated to injure or damage any person or thing.

=== Tanzania ===
The Witchcraft Act of 2002 prohibits witchcraft with a penalty of at least five years or at least seven years in case of intent to harm another person.

=== United States ===
In the states of North Carolina, Oklahoma, Pennsylvania, and Wisconsin, all forms of fortune-telling are illegal.

==== Maryland ====
Fortune-telling and palm reading are illegal in Baltimore. Those convicted are guilty of a misdemeanor and may be fined $500 or imprisoned for up to a year.

Montgomery County, Maryland's ban on fortune-telling was struck down by the Appellate Court of Maryland. The court ruled that fortune-telling was protected free speech under the First Amendment of the US Constitution. The case was brought by a Romani man, with the help of the ACLU.

==== New York ====
Under New York state law, "a person is guilty of Fortune Telling when, for a fee or compensation which he or she directly or indirectly solicits or receives, that person claims or pretends to tell fortunes..."

== See also ==
- List of people executed for witchcraft
- Witch hunt
- Legality of fortune-telling
