= Legality of fortune-telling =

Witchcraft-related laws by country: Practice of magic is illegal Using witchcraft against another person is illegal Accusing someone of being a witch is illegal Pretending to be a witch and accusing someone of being a witch is illegal Practice of fortune-telling is illegal Law repealed

Laws regulating fortune-telling vary by jurisdiction. Some countries and sub-national divisions ban fortune-telling as a form of fraud. Laws banning fortune-telling have often been criticized as infringing upon the freedom of religion and speech or as being racially discriminatory against Romani people, due to the traditional importance of fortune-telling within Romani culture.

== Australia ==
In Australia, most states and territories have repealed laws against fortune-telling that were inherited from English law. Fortune-telling remains a crime in the Northern Territory and South Australia.

== Canada ==
Federal law in Canada formerly criminalized fortune-telling under its law, banning "Pretending to practise witchcraft, etc." The law formerly stated that anyone practicing fortune-telling "is guilty of an offence punishable on summary conviction." The law was repealed in 2018.

== New Zealand ==
Section 16 of New Zealand's Summary Offences Act 1981 provides a one thousand dollar penalty for anyone who sets out to "deceive or pretend" for financial recompense that they possess telepathy or clairvoyance or acts as a medium for money through use of "fraudulent devices." However, it is not a criminal offence if it is solely intended for purposes of entertainment.

== Nigeria ==
The Criminal Code Act of Nigeria bans fortune-telling as a form of witchcraft. Any person who "undertakes to tell fortunes" may be found guilty of a misdemeanor and imprisoned up to one year.

== United States ==
=== California ===
In 1985, the California Supreme Court struck down a law against fortune-telling.

In San Francisco, fortune-telling is regulated as to "thoroughly investigate fraud and deception,” and protect those deemed vulnerable to fraud. To legally practice and monetize fortune-telling, one must have a valid permit issued to them by the San Francisco Police Department. The permit is $775, and is valid for one year.

The permit is subject to suspension or revocation under grounds of fraud, theft, burglary or deceit. If a person violates the regulations, and is convicted of an infraction, a fine between $100 and $500 is issued to the fortune-teller. If convicted of a misdemeanor, the person will be issued a fee between $200 and $800, and/or imprisonment in County Jail for no more than 6 months. Further, if the accused has a previous violation, they will be convicted of a misdemeanor and issued a fine between $300 and $900, and or for each violation, at least 6 months in County Jail. A third conviction results in a fine of $400 to $1,000 and/or the imprisonment of up to 6 months.

=== Maryland ===
Fortune-telling and palm reading are illegal in Baltimore. Those convicted are guilty of a misdemeanor and may be fined $500 or imprisoned for up to a year.

Montgomery County, Maryland's ban on fortune-telling was struck down by the Appellate Court of Maryland. The court ruled that fortune-telling was protected free speech under the First Amendment of the US Constitution. The case was brought by a Romani man, with the help of the ACLU.

=== New York ===
Under New York state law, "a person is guilty of Fortune Telling when, for a fee or compensation which he or she directly or indirectly solicits or receives, that person claims or pretends to tell fortunes..."

=== Pennsylvania ===
The practice of professional fortune-telling has been a misdemeanor under Pennsylvania law since 1861. In 2025, state representative Greg Scott introduced a bill which would repeal the law.

=== Virginia ===
In 2024, the city of Norfolk, Virginia repealed their law banning "the practice of palmistry, palm reading, phrenology or clairvoyance, for monetary or other compensation". The law had been in place for 45 years.

== See also ==
- Fortune telling fraud
- Laws against witchcraft
