= Catherine Peyretone =

Catherine Peyretone was a French woman, born in 1475 and sentenced to death for witchcraft. She was burnt at the stake in 1519.

== Biography ==
Catherine Pereytone is born in 1475 and lived in the town of Montpezat, currently situated in Ardèche, previously called Vivarais. She was the mother of three children.

=== Trial ===
On September 24th 1519, an Inquisition trial started against Catherine Peyretone, who was accused of witchcraft. The trial is recounted in details in Jean-Baptiste Dalamas' book, Les sorcières du Vivarais devant les inquisiteurs de la foi, dated from 1865. The court of inquisition is presided by the Reverend Père Louis Briny and Reverend Père Louis Chambonis. Catherine Pereytone is accused to have renounced God and the Virgin Mary to give herself, "body and soul", to a devil called Barrabam.

The court reproached her to no longer confessing her sins to a priest since meeting the devil; to no longer have received the body of Christ; to fake praying; to have invoked the devil Barrabam to heal people or animals; to have eaten children's flesh and even to have destroyed fruits and crops. During the trial, several witnesses are called and accused her of having committed acts of witchcraft.

Her case was an early one, as the European witch hunt did not fully take place before the second half of the 16th century. It was somewhat uncommon for the Inquisition to execute people for witchcraft, as they normally focused in heresy, and witch trials were often handled by secular authorities.

=== Arrest ===
Catherine Peyretone is arrested on September 25, 1519 and is taken away to the Montpezat Castle where she is detained in a dungeon. The next day, she is interrogated by Reverend Louis Briny and Antoine Tenet, châtelain, and Simon Valentin, notary. During the interrogation, Catherine Peyretone mentioned that she met the devil in the form of a hare about twenty years ago. The devil would have suggested that she renounce God and become her master to make her a rich woman in order to take revenge on her enemies. She is said to have accepted that proposal. She declared having committed all the crimes attributed to her by the Inquisition court. She is then taken to the outer bailey of the castle, where she confessed publicly once again to having committed those crimes.
