= Heinrich Heppe =

German Calvinist theologian and church historian

Heinrich Ludwig Julius Heppe (30 March 1820, Kassel, Hessen-Kassel – 25 July 1879, Marburg) was a German Calvinist theologian and church historian.

In 1844 he earned his doctorate from the University of Marburg, where he was a student of Orientalist Hermann Hupfeld (1796–1866). From 1845 he served as a pastor at St. Martin Church in Kassel. In 1850 he became an associate professor of theology at Marburg, where he attained full professorship in 1864.

Heppe specialized in the field of dogmatics, and excelled in the study of Hessian church history. At Marburg, he was a prime antagonist to the strict Confessional Lutheranism that was espoused by professor August Friedrich Christian Vilmar (1800–1868).

== Written works ==
- Dissertatio inauguralis de loco Evang. Luc. XVI. 1–9. Univ., Phil. Diss.--Marburg, 1844., Marburgi 1844.
- De coena domini. Dissertatio inauguralis theologica., Marburgi Cattorum 1845.
- Thatsachen aus der kurhessischen Kirchengeschichte, oder einige Worte über die unlängst erschienene Schrift des Herrn Pfarrer Vilmar zu Rotenburg, „die Kurhessische Kirche“ betitelt. Krieger, Kassel 1844.
- Geschichte der hessischen Generalsynoden von 1568-1582. 1. Auflage. Fischer, Kassel 1847.
- Historische Untersuchungen über den Kasseler Katechismus v. J. 1539 nach seiner Entstehung und kirchlichen Bedeutung. Luckhardt, Kassel 1847.
- Die Einführung der Verbeßerungspunkte in Hessen von 1604–1610 und die Entstehung der hessischen Kirchenordnung von 1657 als Beitrag zur Geschichte der deutsch-reformirten Kirche. Krieger; Döll und Schäffer, Kassel 1849.
- Beiträge zur Geschichte und Statistik des hessischen Schulwesens im 17. Jahrhundert. Bohné, Kassel 1850.
- Das rechtliche Verhältnis der Universität zu Marburg zur evangelischen Kirche Hessens. Selbstverl., Marburg 1850.
- Die Restauration des Katholizismus in Fulda, auf dem Eichsfelde und in Würzburg. Elwert, Marburg 1850.
- Geschichte des deutschen Protestantismus in den Jahren 1555–1581. Elwert, Marburg 1852–1859.
- Sendschreiben an die hochwürdigen Herren Dr. Thomasius, Dr. Hofmann und Dr. Schmid, den Bekenntnißstand der reformirten Kirche in Kurhessen betreffend. Ferber, Gießen 1855.
- Die confessionelle Entwicklung der hessischen Kirche oder Das gute Recht der reformirten Kirche in Kurhessen. Völcker, Frankfurt a. M. 1853.
- Reliquiae interpretationis evangeliorum Germanicae. Elwert, Marburg 1853.
- Die confessionelle Entwicklung der altprotestantischen Kirche Deutschlands, die altprotestantische Union und die gegenwärtige confessionale Lage und Aufgabe des deutschen Protestantismus. Elwert, Marburg 1854.
- Denkschrift über die confessionellen Wirren in der evangelischen Kirche Kurhessens. Fischer, Cassel 1854.
- Die Kirchengewalt der Kurfürsten von Hessen. Aus der hessischen Kirchenordnung vom 21. October 1566 erwiesen; zur Widerlegung der unlängst erschienenen Schrift: "Die Superintendenten in der ersten Kammer der Landstände in Kurhessen. Kassel 1856" Leske, Darmstadt 1856.
- Einige Worte zur Beurtheilung der von dem Herrn Pfarrer Ruckert zu Kassel veröffentlichten Schrift: Beiträge zur Geschichte der am 20. Oktober 1852 zu Ziegenhain gehaltenen Diöcesansynode. Leske, Darmstadt 1856.
- Der Text der Bergischen Concordienformel, verglichen mit dem Text der schwäbischen Concordie, der schwäbisch-sächsischen Concordie und der Torgauer Buches. Koch, Marburg 1857.
- Dogmatik des deutschen Protestantismus im sechzehnten Jahrhundert. Perthes, Gotha 1857.
- Geschichte der lutherischen Concordienformel und Concordie. Elwert’sche Universitäts-Buchhandlung, Marburg 1857.
- Geschichte des deutschen Volksschulwesens. Bd. 1–5, Gotha 1858–1860 (Nachdruck Hildesheim; New York : Olms, 1971).
- Der kirchliche Verkehr Englands mit dem evangelischen Deutschland im 16. Jahrhundert. Ein Beitrag zur Geschichte des evangelischen Bundes. Koch; William & Norgate, London 1859.
- Halte, was Du hast, damit Niemand Deine Krone nehme! Ein Mahnruf der Kirchenältesten der evangelisch-reformirten Brüder-Gemeinde zu Kassel an ihre Mitältesten in der reformirten Kirche; nebst einem gutachtlichen Responsum. 2. Auflage. Luckhardt, Kassel 1859.
- Ursprung und Geschichte der Bezeichnungen „reformierte“ und „lutherische“ Kirche. Gotha 1859.
- Schriften zur reformirten Theologie. Friderichs, Elberfeld 1860.
- Das Schulwesen des Mittelalters und dessen Reform im sechszehnten Jahrhundert. Mit einem Abdruck von Bugenhagens Schulordnung der Stadt Lübeck. Elwert, Marburg 1860 (Nachdruck Paderborn : Europäischer Geschichtsverlag, 2011).
- Philipp Melanchthon, der Lehrer Deutschlands. Ein Lebensbild dem deutschen Volke dargestellt. Koch, Marburg 1860.
- Die Dogmatik der evangelisch-reformierten Kirche. Friderichs, Elberfeld 1861 (Neuausgabe, durchgesehen und hrsg. von Ernst Bizer, Neukirchen : Neukirchener Verlag, 1958).
- Theodor Beza. Leben und ausgewählte Schriften. Friderichs, Elberfeld 1861.
- Entstehung, Kämpfe und Untergang evangelischer Gemeinden in Deutschland urkundlich dargestellt. H. I: Hammelburg und Fulda Niedner, Wiesbaden 1862 (auch unter dem Titel: Das evangelische Hammelburg und dessen Untergang durch das Papsthum urkundlich dargestellt)
- Die Bedeutung des Heidelberger Katechismus in der Geschichte des Reiches Gottes auf Erden. Krieger, Cassel 1863.
- Zwei Predigten über das evangelische Diaconissenamt. Verl. des Evang. Diaconissenhauses, Treysa bei Ziegenhain 1865.
- Denkschrift über den Untergang des kurhessischen Staats. Ehrhardt; Pfeil, Marburg 1866.
- Zur Geschichte der Evangelischen Kirche Rheinlands und Westphalens. Bd. 1: Geschichte der evangelischen Kirche von Cleve-Mark und der Provinz Westphalen. Bädeker, Iserlohn 1867 (Digitalisat)
- Die Presbyteriale Synodalverfassung der evangelischen Kirche in Norddeutschland. Nach ihrer historischen Entwicklung und evangelisch-kirchlichen Bedeutung beleuchtet. Bädeker, Iserlohn 1868.
- Die Verfassung der evangelischen Kirche im ehemaligen Kurhessen in ihrer historischen Entwicklung. Ehrhardt, Marburg 1869.
- Zur Geschichte der Evangelischen Kirche Rheinlands und Westphalens. Bd. 2: Geschichte der Evangelischen Gemeinden der Grafschaft Mark und der benachbarten Gemeinden von Dortmund, Soest, Lippstadt, Essen etc. Bädeker, Iserlohn 1870 (Digitalisat)
- Katholicismus u. Protestantismus im Hinblick auf die Vaticanischen Concilbeschlüsse betrachtet. Bremen 1871.
- Das Schulaufsichtsrecht des Staates. Eine Forderung der geschichtl. Entwicklung des deutschen Volksschulwesens. Marburg 1872.
- Geschichte der theologischen Facultät zu Marburg. Marburg 1873.
- Geschichte der quietistischen Mystik in der katholischen Kirche. Hertz, Berlin 1875 (Nachdruck Hildesheim; New York : Olms, 1978).
- Kirchengeschichte beider Hessen. Sipmann, Marburg 1876.
- Der Konvent evangelischer Reichsstände zu Naumburg im Mai 1554 und die Bedeutung desselben für den deutschen Protestantismus. Friedrich, Marburg 1877.
- Denkschrift. Die amtliche Bedeutung der Doctorwürde in der Theologischen Facultät zu Marburg betreffend. Marburg 1877.
- Geschichte des Pietismus und der Mystik in der reformirten Kirche, namentlich der Niederlande. Brill, Leiden 1879 (Neuausgabe 2012).
- Christliche Ethik. Hrsg. v. Albert Kuhnert. Elberfeld 1882.
- System der Pädagogik. Hrsg. v. H. Wiegand. Manz & Lange, Hannover-Linden 1892.
