= Grissel Jaffray =

Accused of witchcraft

- Born: 1600s Aberdeen, Aberdeenshire, Scotland
- Died: 1669; Dundee, Angus, Scotland
- Known for: Executed for witchcraft
- Spouse: James Butchart

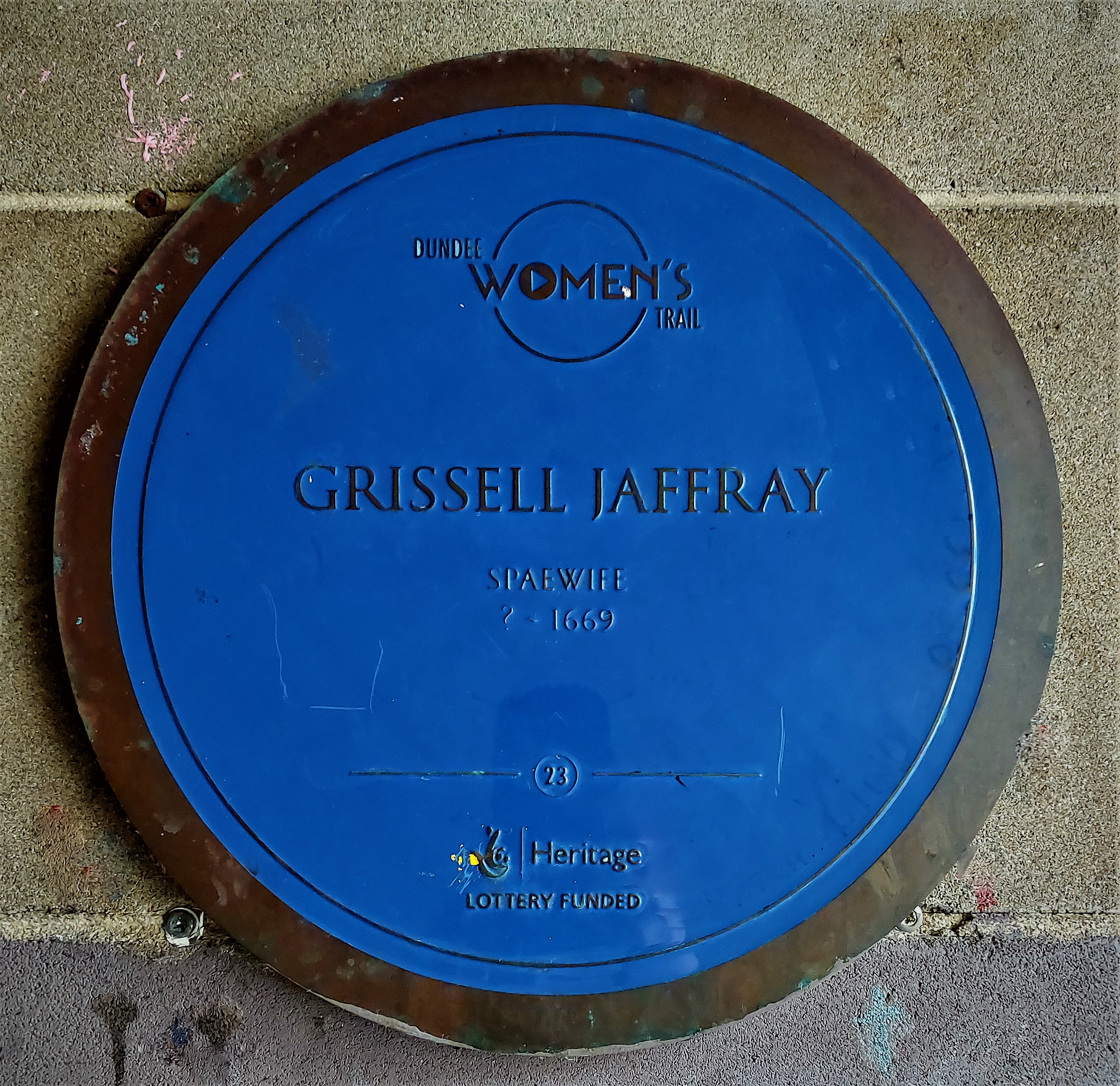
Blue plaque commemorating Grissel Jaffray as part of the Dundee Women's Trail

Grissel Jaffray (? in Aberdeen – 1669 in Dundee) was a Scottish woman burned at the stake having been accused of witchcraft. Jaffray was one of an estimated 4000 to 6000 people who were tried during the Scottish Witch Trials of this period. She was the last person burned for witchcraft in Dundee and is commemorated in the city with a plaque and a mosaic marking the place of her execution.

== Life ==
Jaffray was born in Aberdeen and then moved to Dundee. Little is known about her life, however it is known that Jaffray married James Butchart, a Dundee Burgess, in 1615. It is suspected she was part of the influential Jaffrays of Aberdeen, where Alexander Jaffray was Provost in 1651.

== Accusations and death ==
Jaffray was accused of being a spaewife. Her husband was also charged. The records relating to the accusations have been lost, however the names of the three responsible are known. All three of the accusers were leading ministers in the Dundee Presbytery at the time: Harry Scrymgeour of St Mary's, John Guthrie of South Church and William Rait of Third Charge (now St Paul's).

Jaffray was interrogated and during her torture she accused several others of being witches. She was sent to trial by Dundee Privy Council on 11 November 1669. She was found guilty. Before being burned, Jaffray was strangled. Her husband escaped execution and he finished his life in a poorhouse.

== Legacy ==
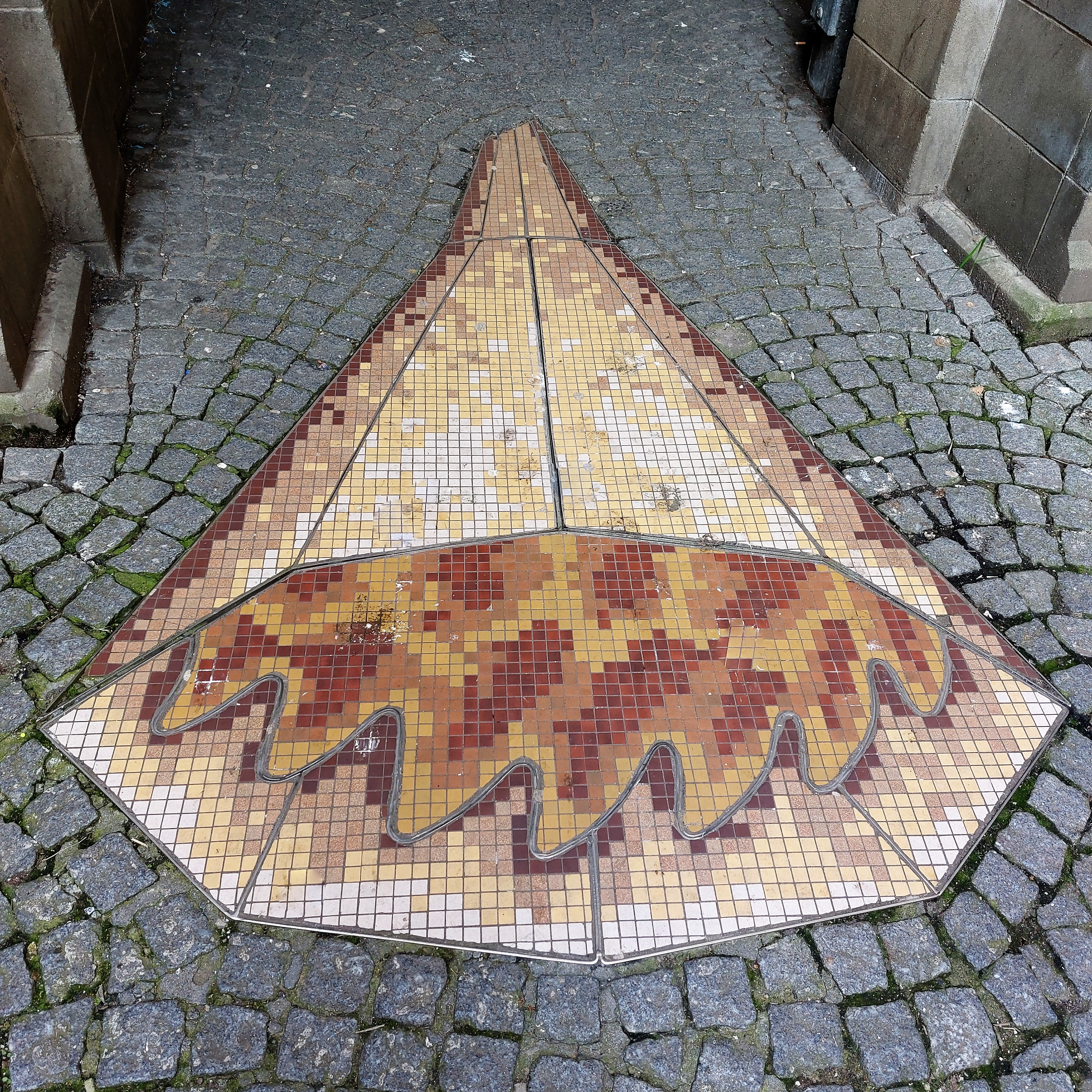
One end of the mosaic commemorating Grissel Jaffray on Peter Street, Dundee. This part represents fire.

A marker in the Howff graveyard in Dundee has come to be known as the 'witches stone' where Jaffray is supposedly buried. However it is unlikely that an alleged witch would be buried on consecrated ground. Local legend has it that leaving her an offering can bring good luck, and the marker can frequently be found with coins, ribbons and other simple offerings placed upon it. The marker is likely to be the conveners stone, the place where the nine trades of Dundee used to meet to conduct business.

Jaffray's name is featured on a plaque that was installed on Peter Street as part of the Dundee Women's' Trail. There is also a mosaic on the ground of two torches, one filled with fire and the other with water, that allegedly marks the spot of her death.

Her life has inspired a book of fiction titled I Am Grissel Jaffray by Claire-Marie Watson, which won the Dundee 6000 award.

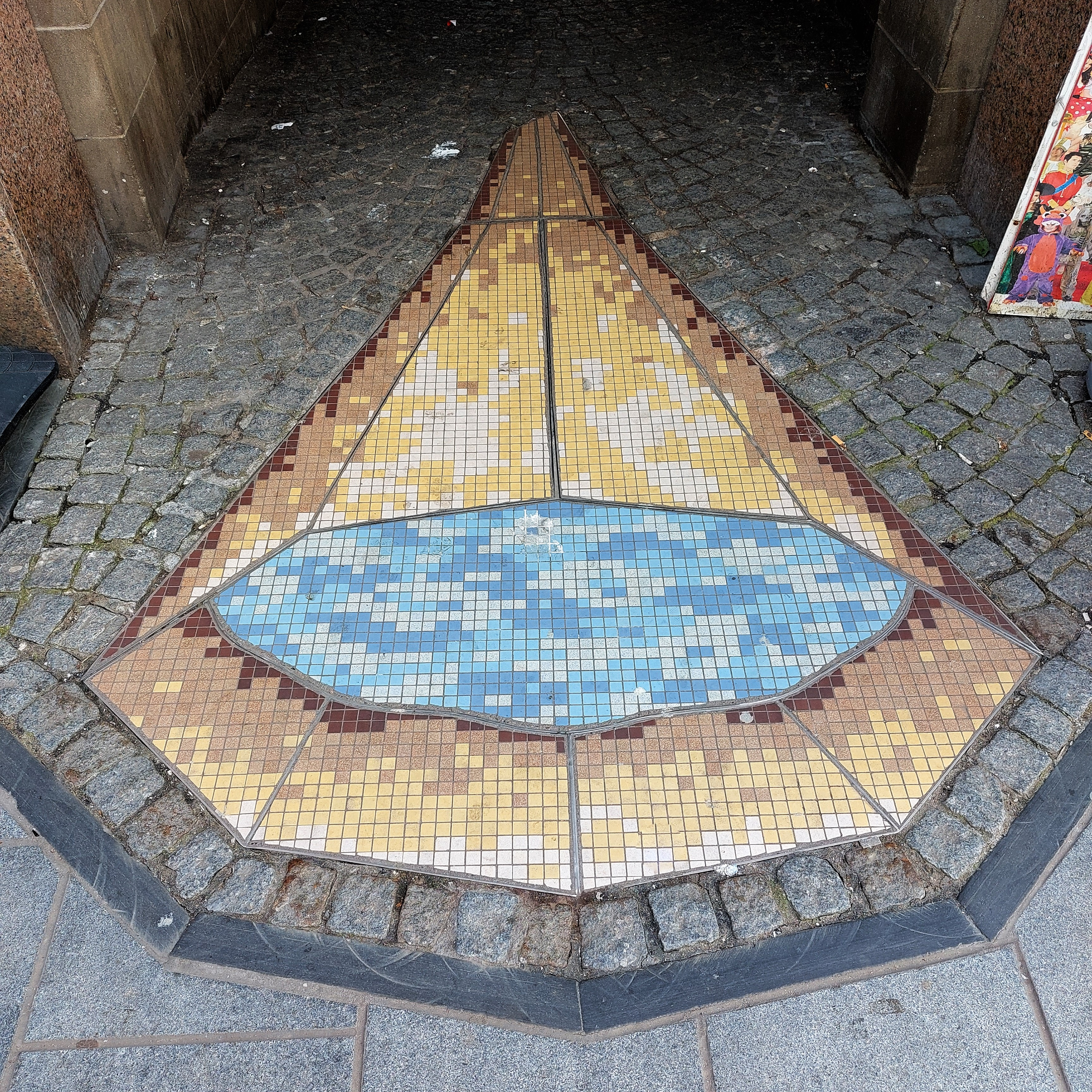
One end of the mosaic commemorating Grissel Jaffray in Peter Street, Dundee. This part represents water.
