= Martha van Wetteren =

Flemish woman executed for witchcraft

Martha van Wetteren (1646, Landegem – 23 October 1684, Belsele, Flanders) was a Flemish woman who was executed for witchcraft. She was the last person to be executed for witchcraft in the Spanish Netherlands.

Martha van Wetteren was a widow, known to professionally perform sorcery for money. Several witnesses gave testimony during her trial, stating that she had made accurate predictions about the future and to have assisted them in love potions and similar tasks. She was judged guilty as charged and sentenced to execution by burning. Her execution was postponed because of her pregnancy, but performed after she had given birth.
