= Elleine Smith =

English woman executed for witchcraft (died 1579)

- Died: April 1579; Chelmsford
- Cause of death: Executed by hanging
- Mother: Alice Chaundeler

Elleine Smith (unknown – 1579) was an English woman executed for witchcraft, and known from one of four surviving pamphlets detailing the so-called Essex Witches. The others mentioned were Elizabeth Frauncis, Margery Staunton and Alice Nokes.

== Life and death ==
Elleine Smith was living in Maldon, Essex, when she was accused, tried, and sentenced to death for witchcraft in 1579. She had at least two children, a son and a daughter.

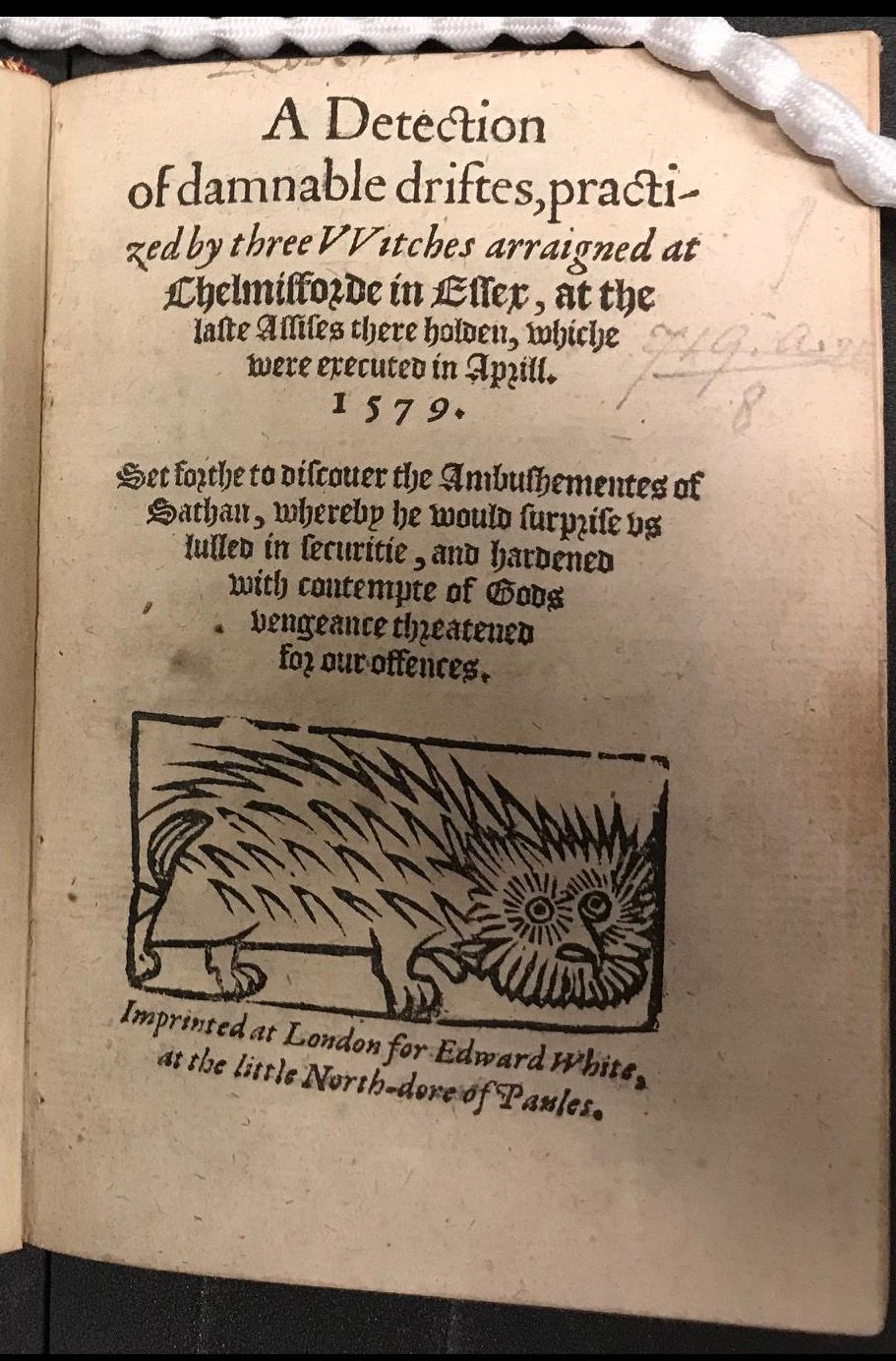
A Detection of Damnable Driftes from the collection of British Library

Smith, whose mother, Alice Chaundeler, had also been executed for supposed 'murder by witchcraft', was accused of killing a child, and suspected of causing the death of her stepfather, who she had recently argued with. She was also said to have attacked a neighbour with a toad spirit. Among Smith's accusers and not unusually was her own son. He claimed that Smith 'kept three spirits': 'Great Dick in a wicker bottle, Little Dick in a leathern bottle, and Willet in a wool-pack.' One of the incidents over which she was accused, was bewitching her neighbour, John Estwood, for refusing alms to her son. In retaliation, it was alleged, she caused Estwood to have 'very greate paine in his bodie'.

The case of Elleine Smith is described in A Detection of Damnable Driftes, Practized by Three Witches Arrainged at Chelmifforde [Chelmsford] in Essex, at the Late Assizes There Holden, Which Were Executed in Aprill, 1579, held by the British Library. An introduction to the anonymously authored pamphlet warns readers of the dangers of Satan, and advocates prayer as a means of protection.

Smith was hanged in Chelmsford in April 1579.
