= Elizabeth Frauncis =

English woman accused of witchcraft three times (c. 1529 - c. 1579)

- Born: 1529; Hatfield Peverel
- Died: 1579 (aged 49–50); Chelmsford
- Cause of death: Execution by hanging
- Occupation: Spinner
- Years active: 1566–1579
- Known for: Woman tried for witchcraft in Tudor England three times; attracted the first witch trial pamphlet and popularised the concept of a witch's familiar
- Criminal charges: Witchcraft (1566, 1573, and 1579)
- Criminal penalty: One-year imprisonment and pillorying (1566, 1573); Capital punishment (1579)
- Spouse: Christopher Frauncis
- Children: At least 1

Elizabeth Frauncis (also recorded as Francis, Francys, Frances, or Fraunces; c. 1529 – 1579) was an English woman who was tried for witchcraft three times, ending with her execution.

Frauncis' initial trial was the first to attract a witch trial pamphlet, which recounted the events of witchcraft cases for general readers, and the first to popularise the concept of a witch's familiar during the witch trials in England.

== Biography ==
Elizabeth Frauncis was raised in Hatfield Peverel. She had a grandmother named Eve, also of Hatfield. Her profession was spinning wool, though she lived in relative poverty, and resorted to begging from neighbours on occasion.

At some point before her first trial, she married Christopher Frauncis, a yeoman, with whom she had a daughter. She would later claim she was initially more interested in a man named Andrew Byles, known locally to be of "some wealth."

== First trial: 1566 ==
In July 1566, Frauncis was tried for witchcraft by the assizes of Chelmsford alongside a daughter and mother pair, Joan and Agnes Waterhouse. Frauncis, who had come under suspicion first, for subsequently accused her neighbours, the Waterhouses, of being her accomplices. Later, Frauncis would describe Agnes as her sister, though it is unclear whether Frauncis meant they were siblings, sisters-in-law, or merely 'sister witches.'

The women were charged under the 1562 Act against Conjurations, Enchantments and Witchcrafts, introduced by the second Parliament of Queen Elizabeth I to criminalise acts seen as venerating the Devil. The act was less punitive than laws which came later. The 1562 act provided that a first-time offender who had not killed another person would receive a year's imprisonment and time in a pillory, and only reoffenders would risk execution.

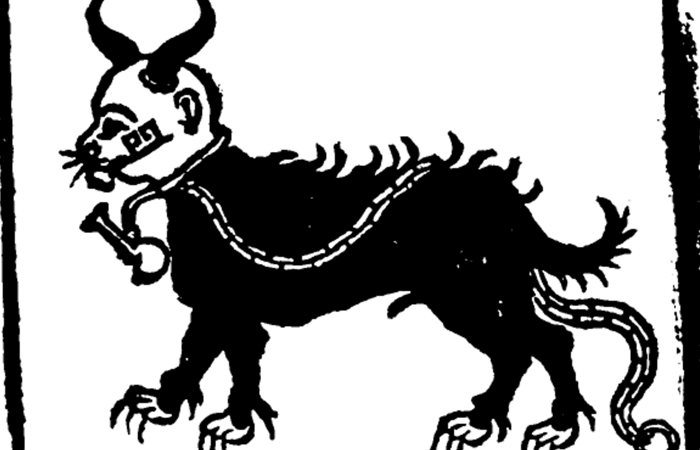
Woodcut print of Sathan, Frauncis' alleged familiar (1566 pamphlet).

Frauncis freely confessed to learning witchcraft from her grandmother, Eve, who gave her a familiar in the form of a wish-granting cat named Sathan when Frauncis was twelve. When Frauncis' attempt to secure a wealthy husband, Andrew Byles, ended with Byles impregnating and leaving her, she enlisted Sathan to kill both Byles and her unborn child. She later married Christopher, but when their relationship proved unhappy and verbally abusive, she asked Sathan to injure Christopher and kill the child they had together.

Having tired of the cat, she entrusted it to co-accused Agnes Waterhouse, who allegedly utilised its services for nine years before the trial began. Agnes also confessed to sorcery, though she likely did so to save her daughter Joan's life.

Proceedings were attended by several prominent members of the royal court, including John Fortescue, Chancellor of the Exchequer and Gilbert Gerard, Attorney General. Historian Wallace Notestein posits that their attendance suggests the trial was of some importance to the state. Indeed, the trial would prove to be one of the first under the 1562 legislation to result in an execution. Agnes Waterhouse was executed by hanging at Chelmsford's gallows on 29 July 1566; Joan was acquitted.

=== First English witch trial pamphlet ===
The 1566 trial of Elizabeth Frauncis and Agnes Waterhouse is recognised to be the first entry into a literary body of pamphlets reporting on witch trials, or, sensationalist texts published cheaply for general audiences. Indeed, much of what is known about the trial derives from a pamphlet published in London a month after the case concluded. As historian Notestein warns, witch trial pamphlets were often exaggerated; it was also not uncommon for these publications to contain invented details.

Court records from the time provide that Frauncis was found guilty on one charge, that of paralysing a child named William Auger. This was not one of the crimes recorded in the pamphlet, nor one of the most serious among Frauncis' self-described offences. It is possible that the prosecution dismissed her testimony, as no records suggest the court attempted to verify the existence of an Andrew Byles and whether he had died as Frauncis described.

Frauncis was sentenced to a year in prison and time in the pillory. Commentators including Rossell Robins and Rosemay Guiley believe that the absence of Frauncis' supposed interactions with Auger were omitted from the pamphlet, despite their apparent greater importance to the court, because its writer deemed them insufficiently salacious.

=== Analysis of Frauncis' motivations ===
Academic Marianne Hester and magician Walter B. Gibson suggest that Frauncis' detailed testimony implies she truly believed she was capable of sorcery. Hester contrasts Frauncis' grandiose claims with the later trials of the St Osyth witches, wherein one accused, Elizabeth Bennett, attempted to provide a rational alternative theory of her alleged magical crime.

It is also possible Frauncis was charged due to local gossip. Folklorist Winifred Finlay theorises that her arrest may have been the result of speculation about her husband Christopher's condition, as he was implied to have a limp. According to both Notestein and Silvia Federici, Frauncis' poverty and subsequent socially undesirable reputation also influenced her first and later arrests. Her begging was likely a nuisance to her more affluent neighbours. According to academic Deborah Willis, the choice of poetry that opens the 1566 trial pamphlets paints Fraunces as a "malevolently solitary figure," and her apparent lack of concern with leading a conventional family life would have been frowned upon by her neighbours.

Frauncis' choice to admit to witchcraft while accusing other women may have therefore been a strategic attempt to share the blame and reduce her own sentence. As a possible self-preservation tactic, this was one Frauncis employed in the face of later accusations.

== Second trial: 1573 ==
Frauncis (appearing under the name Elizabeth Francys) was charged in August 1572 with a second offence of alleged witchcraft. While her surname was recorded with a different spelling during these proceedings to her 1566 trial, all contemporary records describe the accused Elizabeth as committing her offence in Hatfield Peverel, while married to a man named Christopher.

On this occasion, Frauncis was accused of bewitching Mary Cocke, another local of Hatfield Peverel who had "languished for 10 days" following an enchantment by Frauncis. Although Cocke recovered, she had feared for her life while ill. The first indictment against Frauncis was initially poorly drafted and needed to be rewritten, pushing Frauncis' trial to March 1573.

She was tried alongside another accused witch, Agnes Francys, wife of William Francys, who may have been Elizabeth Frauncis' sister-in-law. Frauncis gave evidence against Agnes Francys; both were found guilty.

=== Sentencing ===
Despite this being Frauncis' second conviction under the 1562 act, she received the same sentence as a first-time offender: a year's imprisonment, and pillorying. Authors Willow Winsham and Marion Gibson believe that the administrative errors surrounding the indictment's first draft meant Frauncis was sentenced as a first-time offender, as the redraft did not mention her first conviction. Historian Peter Maxwell-Stuart observes that the Chelmsford assizes were unusually busy with witch trials in 1572 and 1573, and its juries may have grown reluctant to deliver the harshest penalties. However, Maxwell-Stuart also notes that of the five witches tried in the court's session March 1573 session, Frauncis was the only defendant to escape the gallows.

== Third trial: 1579 ==
In 1579, Frauncis stood trial for a crime allegedly committed in June of the previous year. The proceedings, largely recorded in another pamphlet, saw Frauncis stand trial at the same time as Elleine Smith.

Frauncis was accused of conspiring with evil spirits in order to kill her neighbour, Alice Poole, after Poole denied Frauncis' request to borrow some yeast during Lent. A demonic entity in the form of a white dog tormented Poole, who allegedly fell ill and died in November, with Frauncis being the last person to speak to her before she became bedridden.

While admitting her guilt, Frauncis again attempted to give evidence against other women. She denounced two widows in Hatfield Peverel as fellow witches, providing the names Mother Osborne and Elizabeth Lord. Court records do not suggest that either woman was investigated following Frauncis' claims.

Frauncis was found guilty for a third and final time, and executed by hanging.

== In media ==
- Frauncis' first trial, and her role in the trial of the Waterhouses, was featured in the Sky History documentary series Witches of Essex (2025), presented by historian Alice Roberts and broadcaster Rylan Clark.

== See also ==
- Agnes Waterhouse – Frauncis' co-accused in 1566
- Elleine Smith – accused at the same time as Frauncis in 1573
