= Janet Macmurdoch =

- Died: 18 May 1671
- Criminal charges: Maleficium

Janet Macmurdoch (also recorded as Janet McMurdoche, McMuldroch, McMuldritche in the old records) was a Scottish woman tried and executed for witchcraft in Dumfries in 1671. She was accused of causing harm through witchcraft, a type of allegation known as maleficium, during a period of active witchcraft persecution in southwest Scotland.

== Accusations, trial and execution ==
Little is known about Macmurdoch's early life, as surviving records focus mainly on her trial. The accusations against Macmurdoch centred on claims that after arguments or disputes with neighbours, misfortunes followed people became ill, and animals died. These accusations were typical of witchcraft cases in her region, where "maleficium" (harm by magic) often blended with community suspicion and gossip.

Macmurdoch was tried at the same time as another woman, Elspeth Thomson. According to the trial records (case T/LA/1162), they were both found guilty. The trial did not record any formal confessions, torture, or tests, which means the decision was mostly based on what witnesses said.

A surviving document from May 1671 shows that Janet "McMuldroch" and Elspeth Thomson were both sentenced to death in Dumfries. The order said they were to be taken to the place of execution between 2 and 4 in the afternoon on 18 May 1671. It also says they were to be "wirried" (strangled) and then burned at the stake, which was a common way to execute people convicted of witchcraft in Scotland at that time.

== Historical context and significance ==
The trial and execution of McMuldroch happened in southwest Scotland, around Dumfries and Galloway, where people were still very afraid of witches.

Back then, in the late 1600s and early 1700s, people often blamed bad luck, sick animals, or arguments with neighbours on witchcraft. Many people, especially women, were accused and punished because of these fears.

Janet McMuldroch's case shows how easily fights, rumors, and fear in a community could lead to deadly accusations, even when there was no real proof or confession. It also gives historians a picture of how witch trials worked in rural Scotland: arguments, gossip, or bad luck were often enough to get someone convicted. Because of her trial, McMuldroch is remembered as one of many women from that time and place who were accused and punished for witchcraft, making her story part of the bigger history of fear and persecution in early-modern Scotland.

== See also ==
- Witch trials in early modern Scotland
