= Ursulina de Jesus =

Ursulina de Jesus (died 1754), was an alleged Brazilian witch who was executed by burning.

== Life ==
She was married to Sebastiano de Jesus in São Paulo. Her husband had a position of some importance in the city.

She was accused of witchcraft by her husband, who claimed that she had prevented him from having children by making him sterile with the use of magic. At the time, he was having an affair, and his mistress, Cesaria, also confirmed his testimony in court.

She was sentenced guilty of heresy by having used witchcraft. She was executed by burning in public.

Her husband remarried, and did not conceive children with his second wife.

== Sources ==
- Luiz Henrique Lima. Professor Roxanne Rimstead. ANG 553 – Women Writers. 2 April 2009. Lima 1. The Witches in Brazil
