= Narbona Dacal =

- Born: Cenarbe, Kingdom of Aragon
- Died: 12 February 1498; Zaragoza, Kingdom of Aragon
- Other names: Narbona D'Arcal, Narbonne Cenarbe, María de Artal
- Occupation: Healer
- Known for: Execution by the Inquisition
- Spouse: Juan de Portañya

Narbona Dacal, aka Narbona D'Arcal (? in Cenarbe – 12 February 1498, in Zaragoza) was an Aragonese healer in the 15th century who was condemned and executed by the Inquisition in 1498 after accusations of practicing witchcraft.

== Biography ==
Dacal belonged to a family that practiced healing in her rural community using medicinal plants and substances. She had two brothers, Juan and María, and was married to Juan de Portañya, although she was abandoned by him and thereafter lived alone and supported herself as a healer. At the time, the highest concentration of witchcraft persecutions occurred in the rural areas of the Pyrenees near Aragon where she lived, as well as in the Aragon capital of Zaragoza, in Cinco Villas and in the Moncayo mountains.

=== Accusations ===
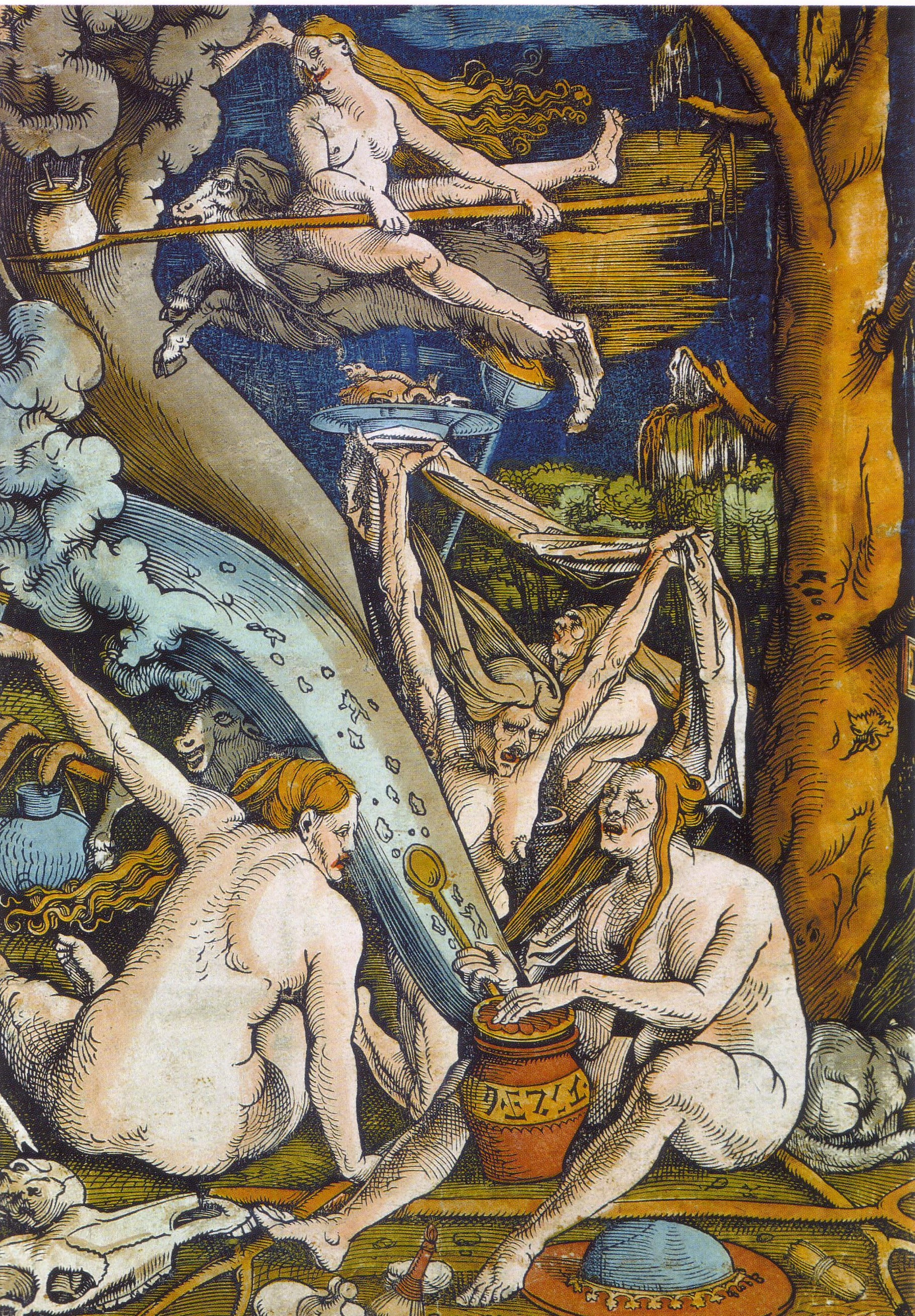
Witches by Hans Baldung (woodcut), 1508

In 1498, a grandmother believed that her granddaughter had overcome a serious illness thanks to her prayers to Saint Cebrián. Shortly after the grandmother's death, another grandchild fell ill and her family lamented that the grandmother could no longer pray for the sick child. Dacal scoffed at these religious beliefs and instead recommended that the family heal the patient using plants instead of prayer.

At the time, according to Herrero, "Saint Cebrián is represented as a bishop before a penitent magician." In this depiction, Cebrián "in the name of goodness, protects those affected by hexes and enchantments, and snatches Lucifer's magical book, full of healing formulas, and over time has become a symbol of healers."

Dacal's mockery was one fact that Cenarbe residents cited to accuse Dacal of witchcraft, also saying they had been bewitched by her and that she had caused women of the town to have miscarriages. Others claimed that Dacal's ministrations forced them to bark like dogs in the church. Some affirmed that Dacal's healings prevented them from seeing the white wafer-like host of the Blessed Sacrament in church at Sunday mass, seeing instead a black spot when the host was raised over the altar by the parish priest.

As happened with another Spanish woman of the time known as Guirandana de Lay, who was called the leader of the coven of Villanúa, the charges brought by the neighbors led to accusations of witchcraft. Collectively these women became known as the Witches of Villanúa, the term used to include many women accused of witchcraft in the Aragonese town of Villanúa in the 15th century.

=== Arrest and execution ===
The Inquisition's Holy Office, located in the Aljafería Palace in Aragon's capital city of Zaragoza, Spain, had Dacal arrested with other women accused of witchcraft and brought to the city. There, allegations were leveled at her by her neighbors. One accused her of giving poisonous grapes to his wife, who "died shortly after very suffering and with great passions in her womb." Another said Dacal and a company of other witches killed his daughter. Yet another testified to the death of a neighbor and said that Dacal had also bewitched the accuser so she could not have children.

On 12 February 1498, Dacal was convicted and burned at the stake in the Aljafería Palace. Her brothers, Juan and María, who were also accused of witchcraft, managed to escape.

== See also ==
- Cenarbe

== External sources ==
- García Herrero, María del Carmen. Women in Zaragoza in the 15th century, Volume 1. University Presses of Zaragoza. 2006. (in Spanish)
- Process against Narbona, wife of Juan de Portanya and neighbor of Cenarbe, accused of witchcraft. (in Spanish)
- Blásquez, Juan. Eros and Thanatos. Witchcraft, witchcraft and superstition in Spain. Arcane. p. 366. (in Spanish)
