= Guirandana de Lay =

Spanish woman executed for witchcraft

- Died: 1461; Spain
- Occupation: Healer
- Known for: Accused witch burned at the stake
- Mother: Vicienta de Lay

Guirandana de Lay (died 1461), was a Spanish healer. She was accused of leading a coven of witches near Villanúa, Spain. De Lay considered herself a healer but was accused of poisoning children and spouses, among other evils, and sentenced to burn at the stake by a seven-man court in Jaca, Spain.

== Biography ==
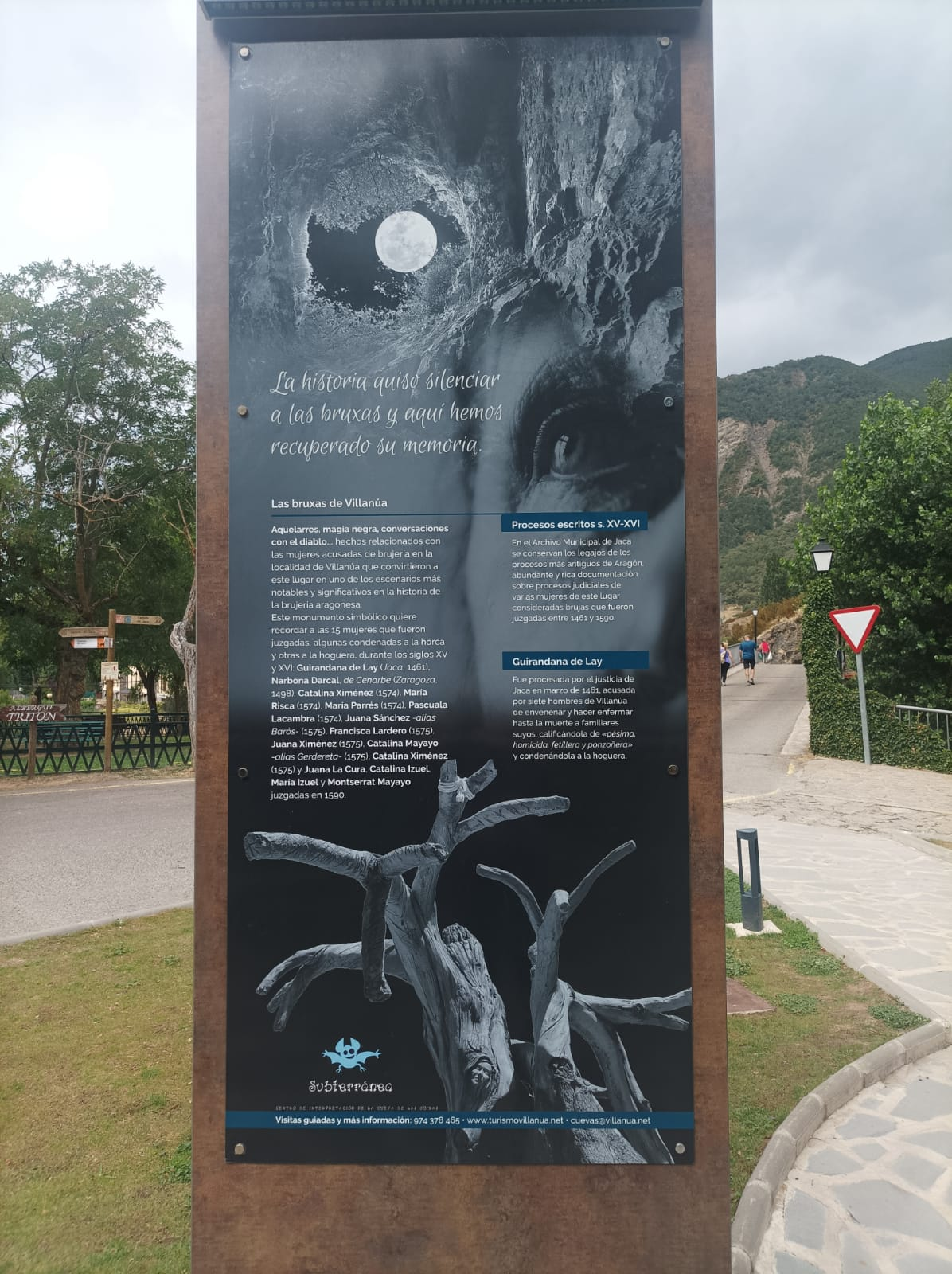
commemorative panel

De Lay's residence was officially recorded as Villanúa in northern Spain, but because of the structure of her name (in English, Guirandana of Lay), she is thought to have moved to Spain from the town of Lay-Lamidou near Pau, in the Viscounty of Béarn, located on the other (northern) side of the Pyrenees mountains. Her mother, Vicienta de Lay is also thought to have moved to northern Spain from southern France, so both women would have been labeled foreigners.

=== Single women in Aragon ===
At that time in the highlands near Aragon, Spain, women like Guirandana, who were single and supporting themselves by engaging in occupations such as herbalism, midwifery, pandering or performing some health work, were more likely to be accused of witchcraft. Traditionally, in Spain, a witch was defined as "an older woman, of low status, who is believed capable, or so she is considered, of causing magical aggression."

In Aragon, the term witch first appears in the official document Ordinations and Paramientos of Barbastro of 1396, but it does not specify which women or men were included in that definition, although many were eventually accused.

=== Prosecution ===
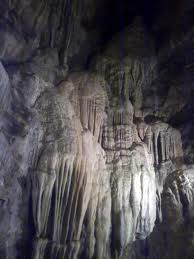
The cathedral room in the caves of Las Güixas near Villanúa, Spain.

De Lay, was thought to be the leader of a coven of witches known as the Witches of Villanúa who gathered in secretive places thought to have mystical attributes such as the caves of Las Güixas. Thirty years later, suspected witches Gracia Del Valle and Narbona Dacal (both executed in 1498), were thought to be members of the same coven.

The accusatory process against de Lay began on 12 March 1461 in the city of Jaca, where the attorney presented several accusations that indicated she had committed crimes. The next day, on 13 March 1461, de Lay was taken prisoner and transferred to Jaca for trial by a court of seven men. The prosecutor presented the criminal charges against her, including poisonings and witchcraft. Guirandana's mother, Vicienta de Lay, was also accused. At the trial's conclusion, the judge found Guirandana guilty and ruled that she was to be burned at the stake.

The documented criminal proceedings mention that de Lay's assets were to be confiscated and sold to pay the court costs, but they do not explicitly record the date and place of de Lay's execution. Scholars have concluded that her sentence was carried out in Jaca in late March 1461.
