= Polissena of San Macario =

Alleged Italian witch (died 1571)

Polissena of San Macario (died 1571) was an alleged Italian witch. She had epilepsy and was burned alive at the stake in Lucca.

The fact that Polisenna suffered from epilepsy was well known. At one occasion, she had suffered a seizure and fallen backwards upon a bed, where she had been "laying like a dead". She had been treated with smelling salt and vinegar, which had been done before to awaken her, and when it had no effect, a bit of fabric had been burnt under her nose. Polissena: "...then opened her eyes and started to make noise by crying very loudly and turned her eyes inside and out, so that all fled from her and left her alone, as she was thought to be a witch...". The morning after, she had asked them not to disturb her when she had a seizure, "...as you will do me more harm than good", and added that it was the epilepsy which had caused her to fall.

She had then been reported for sorcery and arrested for witchcraft. Under torture, she claimed she had replaced her aunt as a witch one year after her death, when she had been called by a voice, smeared herself with oil "...and when I had been turned into a cat and went down the stairs and through the gate, while I left my body behind..." The same description was given by another woman accused in the same witch trial, Margherita di San Rocco: " This wandering I did, I did not do myself, but with my spirit, as I left my body at home", and she added, that if the body was to fall with the face to the ground, they would not be able to come back to it before dawn, but die, and live inside the shape of the cat.

This is reminiscent of the phenomenon called astral projection, which was a serious matter for the church, which taught that body and soul were united until death, which made it heresy; it was the same thing practiced by the benandanti, also often accused for witch craft.

Both Polissena di San Macario and Margherita di San Rocco were judged guilty of sorcery and sentenced to death by burning at the stake.
