= Fulda witch trials =

Persecution of alleged witches in Fulda, Germany

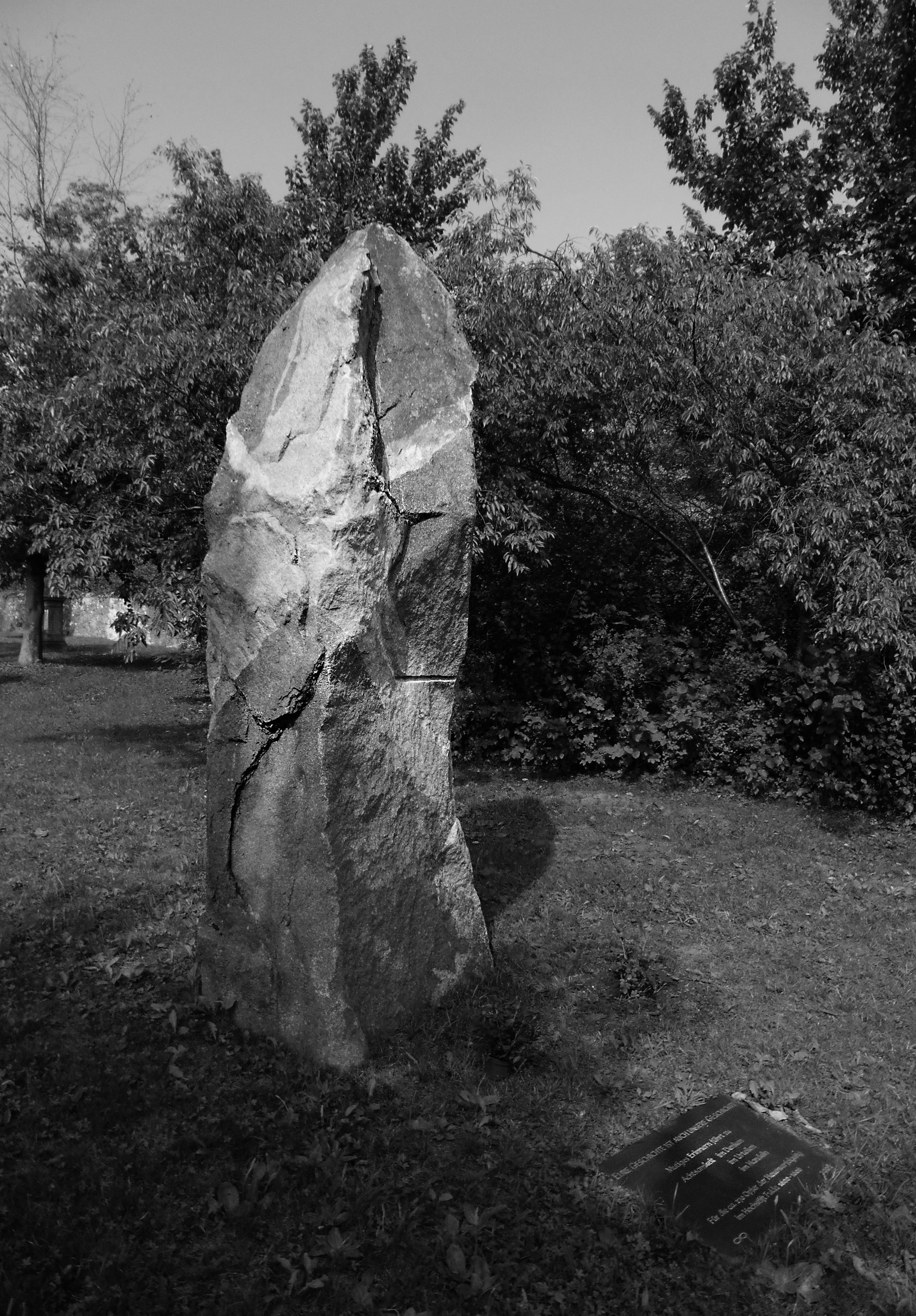
Witch trial memorial in Fulda

The Witch trials of Fulda in Germany from 1603 to 1606 resulted in the death of about 250 people. They were one of the four largest witch trials in Germany, along with the witch trials in Trier, Würzburg, and Bamberg. The persecutions were ordered by the Prince-abbot, a follower of the Counter-Reformation. Crypto-Protestants were executed, usually by immolation on charges of witchcraft.

== History ==
The witch trials were ordered by Prince-Abbot Balthasar von Dernbach (who became a Catholic after his father's death while being raised by maternal relatives, primarily his uncle, Wilhelm Hartmann Klauer von und zu Wohra, Catholic Prince-abbot of Fulda) who had been exiled in 1576 by the local community which was overwhelmingly Lutheran, following his Counter-Reformation policies but was returned to power in 1602 by the Aulic Council. All Protestants had to convert or leave his lands. After more than a quarter-century, he resumed the Counter-Reformation, and announced an investigation of suspected witches and other undesirables. The persecutions were presided over by Balthasar Nuss, who had attached himself to the abbot during the latter's exile and afterward was appointed Zentgraf of Hofbieber and Malefizmeister.

Gerrit Walther, author of Abt Balthasars Mission: Politische Mentalitäten, Gegenreformation und eine Adelsverschwoerung im Hochstift Fulda argues that the organizers of this witchhunt were from the new ruling class allied with the abbot, the victims largely from families of the old Fulda Protestant elite who had been forced to convert to avoid expulsion.

Investigations began in March 1603. Shortly thereafter, the arrests begun in the city. One of the first and the most well-known victim was Merga Bien, whose case even concerned the Imperial Chamber Court. Dernbach was a follower of the Jesuit-dominated Counter-Reformation, and Nuss arrested Crypto-Protestants on charges of witchcraft alongside others. The exact number of victims is not known, but were at least over 200. Accusers of Nuss said he had accused 239 people, while he admitted to 205. The witch hunts ceased soon after the Prince-abbot died on 15 March 1605. in 1606, Nuss was imprisoned and accused of having enriched himself. Nuss remained in custody for 13 years; after the university of Ingolstadt ruled to that effect, Nuss was beheaded in 1618.

== Reception ==
On 15. November 2008, a memorial for the victims of the witch trials was established in Fulda.

== Sources ==
- Heinrich Heppe, Die Restauration des Katholizismus in Fulda, auf dem Eichsfelde und in Würzburg. 1850
- Karl Eder, Die Kirche im Zeitalter des konfessionellen Absolutismus (1555–1648), 1949, 69. 295 f.
- Ingrid Möller-Münch, …ach Gott, so wil ich es gethan haben. Das Leben der Merga Bien. Beitrag zur Hexenverfolgung im Hochstift Fulda (1603 - 1606). Fulda 2008
