= Agnes Waterhouse =

English woman executed for witchcraft

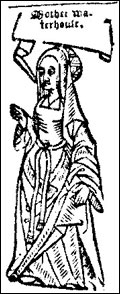
Agnes Waterhouse was accused of bewitching to death William Fynne and was hanged at Chelmsford in England on 29 July 1566

Agnes Waterhouse (c. 1503 – 29 July 1566), also known as Mother Waterhouse, was one of the first women executed for witchcraft in England.

In 1566, she was accused of witchcraft along with two other women: Elizabeth Frauncis and Joan Waterhouse. All three women were from the same village, Hatfield Peverel. She confessed to having been a witch and that her familiar was a cat (later turned into a toad) by the name of Sathan (which is just an obsolete variant for satan), which originally belonged to Elizabeth Francis. Agnes was put on trial in Chelmsford, Essex, England, in 1566 for using witchcraft to cause illness to William Fynne, who died on 1 November 1565. She was also charged with using sorcery to kill livestock, cause illness, as well as bring about the death of her husband. Her eighteen-year-old daughter Joan Waterhouse was also accused (but found not guilty) of the same crime. Joan Waterhouse's testimony ultimately helped to convict the two other women. Agnes was hanged, and was one of the first women executed under the Witchcraft Act 1562 in England, the first being Elizabeth Lowys of Great Waltham, Essex.

== Trial ==
Information from the trial of Agnes Waterhouse is recorded in a pamphlet from 1566 titled, "The examination and confession of certaine Wytches at Chensforde in the Countie of Essex before the Quenes Maiesties Judges the XXVI daye of July anno 1566." The pamphlet was written by John Phillips, and though incomplete, outlines the testimonies of the three women accused of being witches. During the first examination Reverend Thomas Cole and Sir John Fortescue were present. Sir Gilbert Gerard, the queen's attorney, and John Southcote, justice of the queen's bench, were present for the second examination. The presence of all these men suggests that the case was considered to be of unusual significance.

During the trial, Elizabeth Francis was examined first. She confessed to possessing the familiar, a white spotted cat named Satan (or Sathan). Elizabeth Francis received the cat from her grandmother, Mother Eve of Hatfield Peverell, who taught her witchcraft when she was twelve years old. Elizabeth Francis kept the cat for fifteen or sixteen years, before eventually giving it to Agnes Waterhouse. According to Elizabeth Francis, the cat spoke to her in a strange hollow voice and would do anything for her in exchange for a drop of blood. She confessed to stealing sheep, and killing several people including a wealthy man, Andrew Byles, who would not marry her after she became pregnant with his child. Francis also said the cat instructed her on what herbs to drink to terminate the pregnancy. Later, after Francis married, she was unhappy and willed the cat to kill her six-month-old daughter and make her husband lame. The confessions that Elizabeth Francis made expanded the scope of her crimes considerably. Elizabeth Francis was the first to be accused, and is the one who accused Agnes Waterhouse. She was given a lighter sentence, but was hanged after a second conviction thirteen years later. A later pamphlet from a 1579 trial shows that Elizabeth Francis and Agnes Waterhouse were sisters.

Elizabeth Francis gave the cat, Satan, to Agnes Waterhouse in exchange for a cake. She reportedly taught her how to perform witchcraft as she was instructed before by her grandmother, Mother Eve, telling her that "she must call him Satan and give him of her blood and milk as before." Agnes Waterhouse confessed to first having the cat kill one of her own pigs in order to "see what he could do", before, after arguments with her neighbours, having their cows and geese killed. She kept the cat in a pot lined with wool, but wanted to repurpose the wool, so she supposedly turned the familiar into a toad. Other sources recount that the cat had turned himself into a toad. Agnes denied that she had ever succeeded in killing anyone by witchcraft, but was found guilty.

Next, Joan Waterhouse testified that she once tried to "exercise" the cat while her mother was away. Joan Waterhouse had been refused a piece of bread and cheese by a neighbour's child, Agnes Brown, and had invoked the toad's help. She told how the toad promised to assist her if she would surrender her soul, which she did, and then the toad supposedly haunted Agnes Brown in the form of a dog with horns. Joan Waterhouse did not claim to have used the supernatural services of the cat to any large degree, but by testifying to its existence, helped convict the other two women.

The chief evidence against Agnes Waterhouse came from twelve-year-old neighbour, Agnes Brown. In her testimony, Agnes Brown described the demon as a black dog with a face like an ape, a short tail, a chain and a silver whistle around his neck, and a pair of horns on his head. She said that in their first encounter he asked her for some butter, which she refused him, so the dog - who had a key to the milkhouse door - opened the door and got some butter. The child testified that the dog later returned for the last time with a knife and threatened to kill her, saying "that he would thrust his knife to my heart but he would make me to die." The most incriminating piece of evidence was Agnes Brown's account of asking the dog who his "dame" was, to which he wagged his head towards Agnes Waterhouse's home.

== Final confessions and execution ==
On 29 July 1566 - two days after the trial finished - Agnes Waterhouse was executed. At this time she repented and asked for forgiveness from God. She also confessed to her attempt to send the cat to hurt and damage the goods of her neighbour, the tailor named Wardol. However, this was regarded as having been unsuccessful because the Wardol was so strong in faith. When questioned about her church habits, Agnes Waterhouse said that she prayed often, but always in Latin because the cat forbid her from praying in English.

== Legacy ==
The Chelmsford trial was typical of English witchcraft in the absurdity of the charges and the emphasis upon the familiar. This trial resulted in the first punishments and executions for witchcraft in England, and also inspired the first of many pamphlets on both the subject of witchcraft and particular trials that constitute an important source for witchcraft beliefs.

A sketch of "Mother Waterhouse" is in a chapbook describing the trial in the Lambeth Palace Library.

Agnes Waterhouse is a featured figure on Judy Chicago's installation piece The Dinner Party, being represented as one of the 999 names on the Heritage Floor.
