= Pappenheimer witch trial =

16th-century family tried and executed for witchcraft

The Pappenheimer Case centered around a family who were tried and executed for witchcraft in 1600 in Munich, Bavaria, Germany. The family were executed, along with accomplices they were forced to name under torture, after a show trial as scapegoats for a number of unsolved crimes committed years back in a display of extreme torture intended to deter the public from crime. The witch trial resulted in the death of twelve people: four of the Pappenheimer family and two of their accused accomplices in the first trial, followed by the remaining member (Hansel, aged 10) of the family and five other named accomplices in the second trial. The trial was one of the most well-publicized witch trials in German history.

== Background ==
The Pappenheimer family consisted of Paulus and Anna Gämperl and their three sons: the adult sons Michel (sometimes called Jacob) and Gummprecht Gämperl, and their youngest son, 10 or 12 year old Hansel (sometimes called Hoel) Gämperl. While their last name is individually given as Gämperl or Pämb, the family as a whole are often referred to, and became known in history as, the Pappenheimer family. They belonged to the lower class in society, and were vagrant beggars from Swabia. They supported themselves as traveling emptiers of privies and by digging graves, which at this time belonged to the very lowest of professions.

== Arrest ==
At this time, the government in Bavaria conducted a campaign against vagrants and criminals. There had been many crimes committed by vagrants, whom the government had been unable to arrest. An arrested thief pointed out the two adult sons of the family, Michel and Gumpprecht, as his accomplices in the murder of pregnant women, and denounced the whole family as robbers and murderers prior to his execution. The local officials of the Danubian provinces of Bavaria were informed to look out for the family.

In February 1600, the family was arrested and imprisoned in Altmannstein under the custody of prefect Alexander von Haslang zu Haslangsreut, Grosshausen und Reid. They were arrested in the middle of the night, taken from their beds and taken to jail. Initially, only the adults of the family were arrested and the ten-year-old Hansel was left with their landlord, who shortly after brought him to his parents in jail, not knowing what else to do with him.

== Interrogation and trial ==
On the order of Maximilian I, the Elector of Bavaria, they were taken from Altmannstein to the Bavarian capital of Munich, where they were imprisoned in Munich's Falcon Tower. A leading official in the trial was the duke's councillor Johann Sigismund Wagnereckh, who had long made unsuccessful attempts to promote witch trials in Bavaria, but with the exception of some trials in 1589–90, witch trials had been uncommon in Bavaria because of the general opposition to such trials among the Bavarian elite. Wagnereckh conducted several interrogations of the family by use of severe torture. A main concern of Wagnereckh was the charge that the Pappenheimers had murdered children to grind their hands to a powder they could eat, which would give them magical powers and help them commit murders and robberies.

It appears that the Duke's government wished to make an example of the family in a period of many vagrant crimes, which the government had been unable to solve. Witchcraft was a crime which could include many other crimes, which made it useful as a general charge in a show trial toward scapegoats. The Pappenheimers appear to have been subjected to a show trial and meant to be made an example of, and "As many as possible of the unsolved crimes of the past few years were to be put down to the account of the accused."

Hansel was tortured first because, as a child, he was expected to break first. The family were tortured by the strappado, rope burns, and torch burnings while Hansel, as a child, was beaten with a cane.

Initially, they denied the charges, but they were exposed to torture so fierce and so prolonged that all but Hansel confessed to anything of which they were accused. They confessed to having sexual intercourse with the Devil and to making a pact with him, promising to aid him in exchange for money and possessions. They made the pact by giving the Devil hair from the left side of their head, their armpit, and their private parts as well as a piece of nail from the big toe of their left foot and "powder of children's hands." The Devil then scratched them on their left side, drawing blood, "which he collected in a little box; took out a sheet of paper, which he placed on his knee; and put a pen into" their hand for them to sign. As they were illiterate, he guided their hands as they wrote. "Then he wrapped up in the paper all the things that" they "had given him, and took them with him".

The torture made the family confess to a great number of crimes, encompassing almost every unsolved major and minor crime of the last decade. The family appear to have been purposely subjected to a show trial and meant to be made an example of, and "As many as possible of the unsolved crimes of the past few years were to be put down to the account of the accused." This included a confession that they had murdered pregnant women to secure the hands of their unborn children for use in witchcraft.

"Of Paulus Gämperl it was said that he had 'crippled and slain one hundred young children and ten old people by dint of vile sorcery.' The crowd also heard how 'he had entered the cellars of innkeepers and other folk, shamelessly devouring such victuals and drink as he might lay his hands on.' He had further confessed to having 'committed ten robberies from churches, violently slain forty-four persons by his hand alone, set fire to homes or barns eight times, broken into houses by night fourteen times, pillaging and robbing the tenants, robbed wayfarers on the highway five times, and committed four other thefts'" (Kunze 399).

"In like manner, his wife ... Anna Gämperl, being sixty years of age, has assailed one hundred infants and nineteen old people with her spells, crippling them and killing them in godless fashion; she has entered cellars on eight occasions, has committed one murder by her own hand, set fire twice to the homes of others, has caused four gales and hailstorms, and has poisoned meadows and afflicted cattle so often that she herself cannot tell the number" (Kunze 399).

"The elder of her two sons, called Gumpprecht,...has caused the death of thirty children and adults by means of sorcery: has entered cellars on twelve occasions, burgled and robbed nine churches, committed twenty-four murders, set fire to nine homes, broken in by night and robbed fold six times. He has four times committed highway robbery, poisoned and ruined fields and cattle without number, and caused strife between God-fearing spouses on four occasions" (Kunze 400).

"The other, her son Jacob, aged twenty-one years, has slain sixty-five infants and five adults by sorcery, has ten times entered cellars, has committed five thefts from churches, has put to death and murdered thirty-three persons by his own hand, set five fires, broken in five times by night, committed four other thefts, caused ten gales and hailstorms, poisoned fields and beasts twenty-six times".

They were also tortured to name accomplices, and implicated over four hundred other people, including people who did not appear to exist. In the Summer of 1600, two more men were arrested as their accomplices: the farmer Ulrich Schülz and the tailor Georg Schmülz.

== Executions ==
=== First execution ===
The four adults of the family, the parents and their two eldest sons, were all sentenced to death, along with the two men who had been charged with them. Paulus Gämperl was considered the leader of the group.

Hansel Gämperl, being ten or twelve years old, was not sentenced to death, but Wagnereckh ordered that he should be made to attend his family's execution and watch them die, as this was regarded to provide a salutary effect on him. The sheriff took Hansel to the execution on his horse and allowed him to mix with the spectators under watch and under the order to note how he behaved and what he said.

All six were ripped, six times, with red hot tongs. Anna Gämperl's breasts were cut from her body, a highly unusual punishment, and the severed breasts were rubbed around Anna's mouth, and the mouths of her sons. Following this, the six condemned were transported by cart to the place of execution. According to the sheriff, the child Hansel, watching the two carts, said:

"Look, look! What a grand wedding for my father and mother! They've got so many men-at-arms--the duke doesn't have as many himself!"

The carts temporarily stopped by a cross by the Neuhaus gate where they were, according to custom, led in chains to say a prayer. The condemned were led to the cross, and on their way back to the carts, given wine by two municipal officials before proceeding to the place of execution.

At the place of execution, the five males had their arms broken on the wheel. According to the sheriff's notes, Hansel cried 'Look how they're thumping my father's arms!'. The father Paulus Gämperl was executed by impalement, a sharp stake being inserted into his anus and through his intestines — a punishment normally no longer used at this point in time. Finally, they were executed by burning. Normally in Bavaria, the execution by burning was performed by first strangling the condemned, but the law made provision for burning people alive if it was deemed necessary as a deterrent. According to the sheriff's notes, Hansel, on the sheriff's horse, burst into heart-rending cries: 'My mother is squirming!' he cried in despair."

=== Second execution ===
The first execution was followed by the arrest, interrogation and trial of the people named by the Pappenheimers as their accomplices under torture. Six additional people: two men and three women (a mother and her daughters) were condemned to be burned for witchcraft after having been tortured to confess and name accomplices. The remaining condemned was the ten year old Hansel Gämperl (re-baptized and renamed Cyprian following the executions of his parents and brothers). After having examined the report made by the sheriff of Hansel's behaviour and comments during the execution, Hansel was also sentenced to death despite his age. On 26 November 1600, the executions of Hansel Gämperl and the five other condemned took place in Munich.

== The end ==
Hansel Gämperl and the other recently executed had named accomplices under torture, and Johann Sigismund Wagnereckh wished to continue the witch hunt by arresting those named. However, some Bavarian lawyers and officials questioned if it was legally justified to subject anyone to torture after a denunciation made under torture. Furthermore, the newly-denounced were of higher social position, with the knowledge, contacts and ability to defend themselves. The Duke then ordered a stop to the witch hunt referring to irregularities in the legal procedure. However, no one was punished, and Wagnereckh continued to have a successful career in the government bureaucracy.

== Aftermath and legacy ==
The Pappenheimer Case became infamous in contemporary Europe; it was widely publicized throughout Germany, and was discussed in the academic witchcraft debate among demonologists such as Martin del Rio.

Johann Sigismund Wagnereckh continued to promote the use of witch trials in Bavaria but opposition ensured they remained relatively uncommon. With the exception of a witch trial with 39 victims in Wemding (1629–30), the cases in Bavaria were few. Veronica Zerritsch became the last witchcraft execution in Bavaria in 1756.

== Accounts ==
The historian Joseph Hormayr, Baron zu Hortenburg provides a detailed excerpt from an old chronicle depicting these events in the 1844 edition of Taschenbuch für die vaterländische Geschichte, pages 331–332.

In Münich 29. July 1600, six persons were executed in the following manner: The vagabond and beggar Paul Gämperl was impaled, his wife had her breasts cut off, and both herself and two of her sons had those breasts smeared onto their mouths. In addition, two other men and associates were executed, and all six were pinched with glowing pincers. Their arms were broken on the wheel, and they were afterwards burnt alive. They had confessed to being devoted to the Devil, and with his help, in particular by making a devilish, magic salve, to have contributed to the deaths of at least 400 children and more than 50 old people by having applied that salve. Paul Gämperl was condemned for being directly responsible for 44 murders; in total, the six were condemned for 74 murders.

In addition, they had been charged with many acts of robbery, theft and nightly burglaries, where they had plundered houses and killed the people in the houses. They had also, according to the charges, put on fire diverse hamlets and marketplaces, principally in order to get away with goods in the ensuing confusion. Also, they had conjured up bad weather, killed cows in the field, robbed churches and sold to the Jews the holy wafers.

On 27 November 1600, the next group were executed. This was a mother and her two daughters, as well as two other men. The last to be executed was the 12-year-old son of Paul Gämperl, who in the intervening time had been baptized and given the name Cyprian. However, that did not help him, he was first strangled, and then his corpse was burned. The other five were burnt alive. Cyprian was condemned for having performed 8 murders on his own. The members of the whole group had, under torture, admitted to having contributed to the deaths of over 400 children, having killed, by means of sorcery, 39 individuals, and admitted 62 murders besides.

Some divergences, such as Anna Gämperl having died prior to being burnt, rather than burning alive in the Hormayr account, in the chronicle used by Hormayr can be seen relative to an English account of the trial already in 1601 (translated from a Dutch copy of the German original), A Strange Report of Sixe most notorious Witches

== Further reading and sources ==
- Horn, Michael (2009). "Das Leben und gewaltsame Ende der Landstreicherfamilie Pämb, genannt die Pappenheimer". Historische Serienmörder (in German). Vol. 2. Arnstadt: Kirchschlager Verlag. ISBN 978-3-934277-25-0.
- Muir, Edward (2005) [1997]. Ritual in Early Modern Europe. New Approaches to European History, No. 33. Cambridge: Cambridge University Press. pp. 118–119. ISBN 978-0-521-84153-5.
- Burton, Dan E.; Grandy, David A. (2004). Magic, Mystery, and Science: The Occult in Western Civilization. Bloomington, IN: Indiana University Press. p. 177. ISBN 978-0-253-21656-4.
- Hughes, Sarah Shaver; Hughes, Brady (1997). Women in World History: Volume 2, Readings from 1500 to the Present. Vol. 2. Armonk: M.E. Sharpe. p. 76. ISBN 978-1-56324-313-4.
- Kunze, Michael (1987). Highroad to the Stake: A Tale of Witchcraft. Translated by Yuill, William E. Chicago: University of Chicago Press. ISBN 978-0-226-46211-0.
- A History of Magic and Witchcraft: Sabbats, Satan & Superstitions in the West
