= Merga Bien =

Fulda, Germany witch trials victim

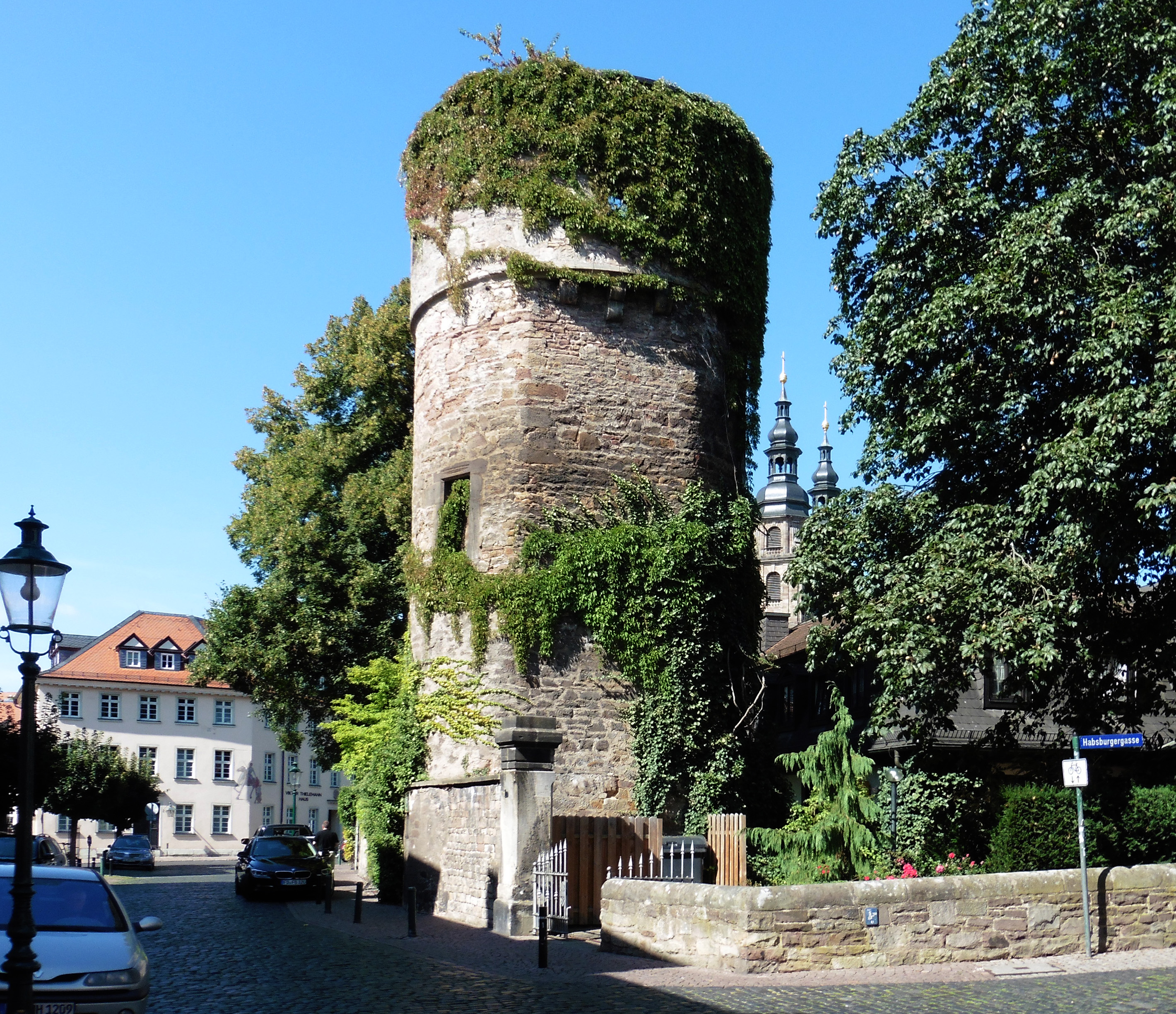
Tower used as prison during the witch trials in Fulda

Merga Bien (late 1560s – 1603) was a German woman convicted of witchcraft and perhaps the most famous of the victims in the Fulda witch trials in 1603–05.

== Life ==
Bien was born in the city of Fulda. She was married three times and was the heiress of her first two husbands, which later played an important part in accusations. In 1588, she married Blasius Bien and moved from the city, but, fatefully, returned after a conflict with her husband's employers.

At the time, prince abbot Balthasar von Dernbach, who had returned to power in 1602 after a long exile, ordered an investigation of witchcraft in the city. Over two hundred people were executed for witchcraft in witch trials that lasted until his death in 1605. In March 1603, the investigations resulted in the first wave of arrests in the city. On 19 June, Merga was arrested and put in jail. Her husband protested before the Reichskammergericht in Speyer and pointed out that she was pregnant. In jail, she was forced to confess to the murder of her second husband and her children with him and one member of the family of her husband's employers, and that she had taken part in a sabbath of Satan. Her pregnancy was considered an aggravating circumstance; she and her husband had no children although they had been married for fourteen years. She was forced to confess that her current pregnancy was the result of intercourse with the Devil. Bien was convicted of witchcraft and burnt alive at the stake in Fulda in late 1603.
