= Montpezat-sous-Bauzon =

- Commune
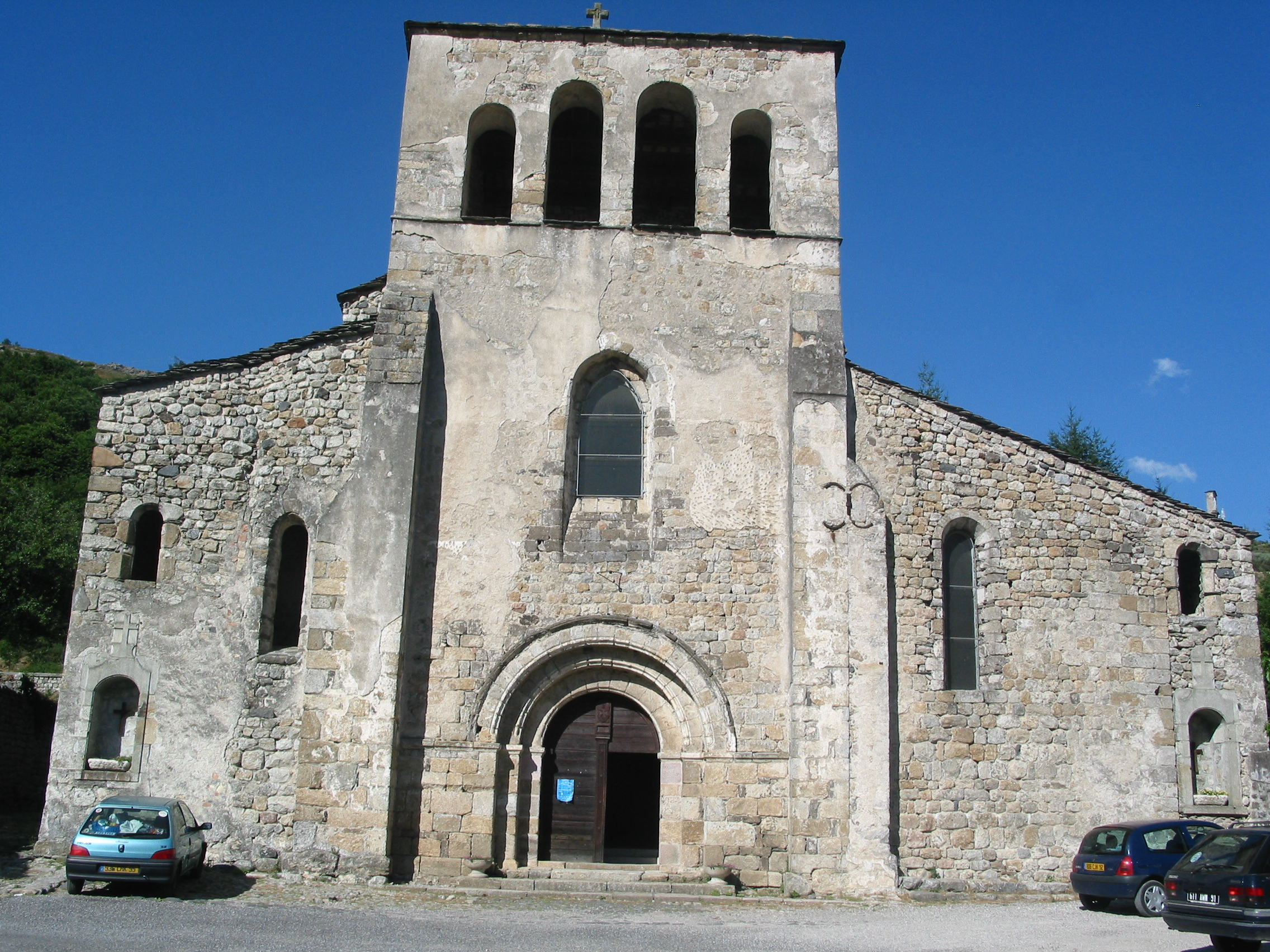
- The church of Our Lady of Prévenchère, in Montpezat-sous-Bauzon

- Coat of arms
- Location of Montpezat-sous-Bauzon
- Location within France Location within Auvergne-Rhône-Alpes
- Coordinates: 44°42′47″N 4°12′26″E
- Country: France
- Region: Auvergne-Rhône-Alpes
- Department: Ardèche
- Arrondissement: Largentière
- Canton: Haute-Ardèche
- Intercommunality: Ardèche des Sources et Volcans

Government
  - Mayor (2020–2026): Marie-France Fabreges
- Area^{1}: 27.23 km^{2} (10.51 sq mi)
- Elevation: 550 m (1,800 ft)
- Highest elevation: 1,464 m (4,803 ft)
- Lowest elevation: 430 m (1,410 ft)
- Population (2023): 770
  - Density: 28/km^{2} (73/sq mi)
- Time zone: UTC+01:00 (CET)
  - Summer (DST): UTC+02:00 (CEST)
- INSEE/Postal code: 07161 /07560
- ^{1} French Land Register data, which excludes lakes, ponds, glaciers > 1 km^{2} (0.386 sq mi or 247 acres) and river estuaries.

Montpezat-sous-Bauzon (French pronunciation: [mɔ̃pəza su bozɔ̃]; Occitan: Montpesat) is a commune in the Ardèche department in southern France.

== Population ==
Historical population
| Year | Pop. | ±% p.a. |
|---|---|---|
| 1968 | 693 | — |
| 1975 | 676 | −0.35% |
| 1982 | 649 | −0.58% |
| 1990 | 698 | +0.91% |
| 1999 | 634 | −1.06% |
| 2007 | 764 | +2.36% |
| 2012 | 864 | +2.49% |
| 2017 | 797 | −1.60% |
| 2023 | 770 | −0.57% |
Source: INSEE

== See also ==
- Communes of the Ardèche department
