= Witch hunt =

Search for witchcraft or subversive activity

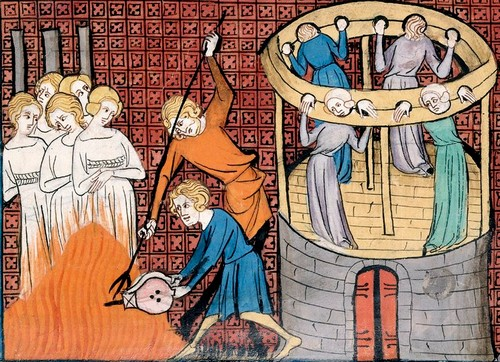
Burning witches, with others held in stocks, 14th century

A witch hunt, or a witch purge, is a search for people who have been labeled witches or a search for evidence of witchcraft. Practicing evil spells or incantations was proscribed and punishable in early human civilizations in the Middle East. An intensive period of witch-hunts occurring in Early Modern Europe and to a smaller extent Colonial America, took place from about 1450 to 1750, spanning the upheavals of the Protestant Reformation, Counter Reformation, and the Thirty Years' War, resulting in an estimated 35,000 to 60,000 executions. (Note: The Encyclopedia Britannica sets a limit of "no more than 40,000 to 60,000." The high end of that range originates with Brian P. Levack's first edition of The Witch-Hunt in Early Modern Europe, which he revised down to 45,000 in the third edition. William Monter estimates 35,000 deaths; Malcolm Gaskill and Richard Golden both estimate 40,000–50,000. Anne Lewellyn Barstow adjusted Levack's first estimate to account for lost records, estimating 100,000 deaths. Ronald Hutton argues that Levack's estimate had already been adjusted for these, and revises the figure to approximately 40,000. James Sharpe concurs: "The current consensus is that 40,000 people were executed as witches in the period of the witch persecutions, between about 1450 and 1750.") The last executions of people convicted as witches in Europe took place in the 18th century. In other regions, like Africa and Asia, contemporary witch-hunts have been reported from sub-Saharan Africa and Papua New Guinea, and official legislation against witchcraft is still found in Saudi Arabia, Cameroon and South Africa today.

In contemporary English, "witch-hunt" metaphorically means an investigation that is usually conducted with much publicity, supposedly to uncover subversive activity, disloyalty, and so on, but with the real purpose of harming opponents. It can also involve elements of moral panic, as well as mass hysteria.

== Anthropological causes ==
The wide distribution of the practice of witch hunts in geographically and culturally separated societies (Europe, Africa, New Guinea) since the 1960s has triggered interest in the anthropological background of this behaviour. The belief in magic and divination, and attempts to use magic to influence personal well-being (to increase life, win love, etc.) are universal across human cultures.

Belief in witchcraft has been shown to have similarities in societies throughout the world. It presents a framework to explain the occurrence of otherwise random misfortunes such as sickness or death, and the witch sorcerer provides an image of evil. Reports on indigenous practices in the Americas, Asia and Africa collected during the early modern Age of Exploration have been taken to suggest that not just the belief in witchcraft but also the periodic outbreak of witch-hunts are a human cultural universal.

One study finds that witchcraft beliefs are associated with antisocial attitudes: lower levels of trust, charitable giving and group participation. Another study finds that income shocks (caused by extreme rainfall) lead to a large increase in the murder of "witches" in Tanzania.

Silvia Federici posits this expanding violence against women as stemming from dispossession of land and female autonomy. A clear separation from mystical mythologies. She names it as both as a historical phenomenon, as well as one that continues today as capitalism and privatization spreads into the global south.

== History ==
=== Ancient Near East ===
Punishment for malevolent magic is addressed in the earliest law codes, which were preserved in both ancient Egypt and Babylonia, where it played a conspicuous cultural role. The Code of Hammurabi (18th century BC short chronology) prescribes that:

If a man has put a spell upon another man and it is not yet justified, he upon whom the spell is laid shall go to the holy river; into the holy river shall he plunge. If the holy river overcomes him and he is drowned, the man who put the spell upon him shall take possession of his house. If the holy river declares him innocent and he remains unharmed the man who laid the spell shall be put to death. He that plunged into the river shall take possession of the house of him who laid the spell upon him.

The Hebrew Bible condemns sorcery. Deuteronomy 18:10–12 states: "No one shall be found among you who makes a son or daughter pass through fire, who practices divination, or is a soothsayer, or an augur, or a sorcerer, or one that casts spells, or who consults ghosts or spirits, or who seeks oracles from the dead. For whoever does these things is abhorrent to the Lord"; and Exodus 22:18 prescribes: "thou shalt not suffer a witch to live". Tales like that of 1 Samuel 28, reporting how Saul "hath cut off those that have familiar spirits, and the wizards, out of the land", suggest that in practice sorcery could at least lead to exile, and the Hebrew verb הכרית, translated in the King James Version as "cut off", can also be translated as "kill wholesale" or "exterminate".

In the Judaean Second Temple period, Rabbi Simeon ben Shetach in the 1st century BC is reported to have sentenced to death eighty women who had been charged with witchcraft on a single day in Ascalon. Later the women's relatives took revenge by bringing false witnesses against Simeon's son and causing him to be executed in turn.

=== Ancient Greco-Roman world ===
No laws concerning magic survive from Classical Athens. However, cases concerning the harmful effects of pharmaka – an ambiguous term that might mean "poison", "medicine", or "magical drug" – do survive, especially those where the drug caused injury or death. Antiphon's speech "Against the Stepmother for Poisoning" tells of the case of a woman accused of plotting to murder her husband with a pharmakon; a slave had previously been executed for the crime, but the son of the victim claimed that the death had been arranged by his stepmother. The most detailed account of a trial for witchcraft in Classical Greece is the story of Theoris of Lemnos, who was executed along with her children some time before 338 BC, supposedly for casting incantations and using harmful drugs.

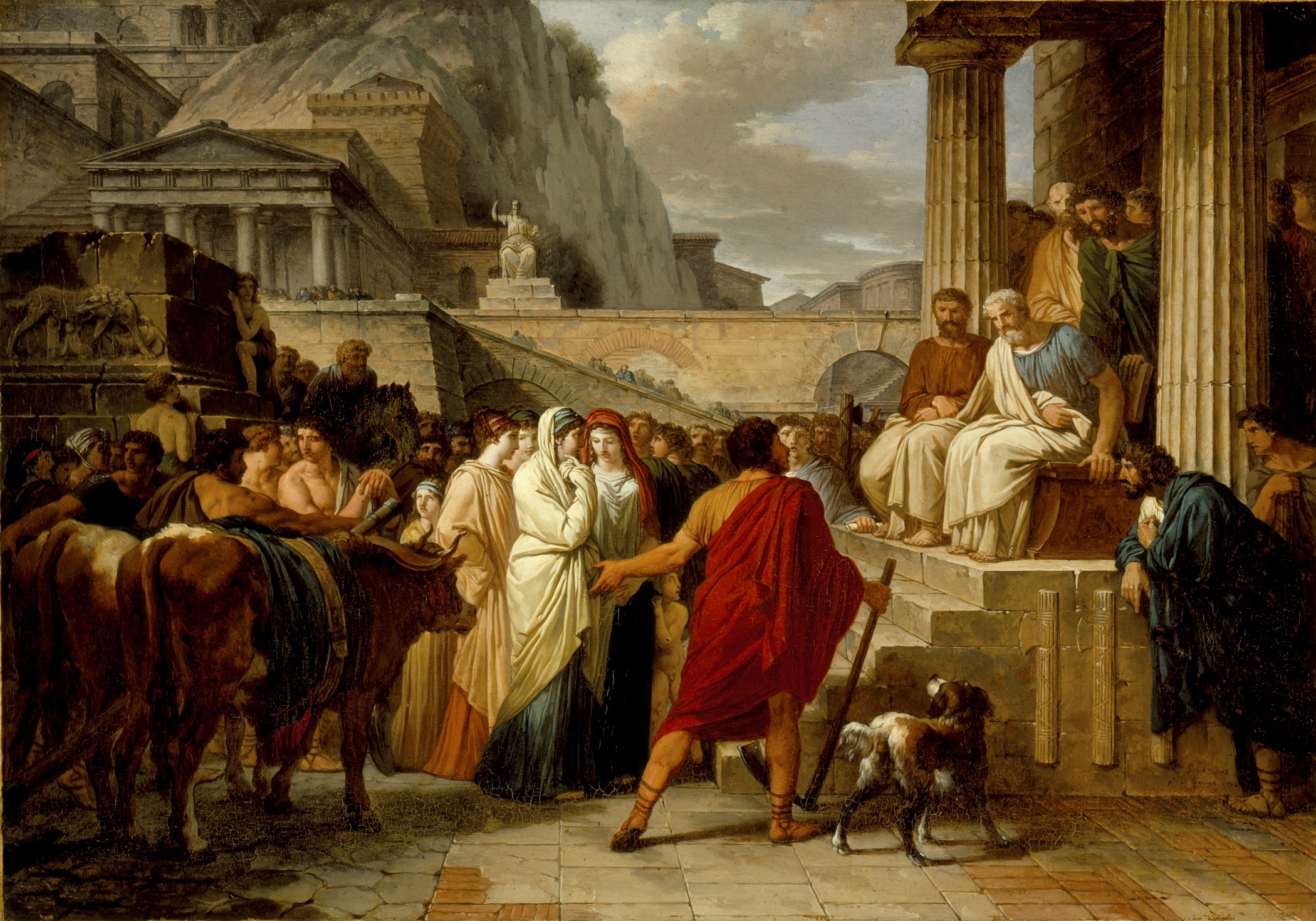
Caius Furius Cressinus Accused of Sorcery, Jean-Pierre Saint-Ours, 1792

During the pagan era of ancient Rome, there were laws against harmful magic. According to Pliny, the 5th century BC laws of the Twelve Tables laid down penalties for uttering harmful incantations and for stealing the fruitfulness of someone else's crops by magic. The only recorded trial involving this law was that of Gaius Furius Cresimus.

The Classical Latin word veneficium meant both poisoning and causing harm by magic (such as magic potions), although ancient people would not have distinguished between the two. In 331 BC, a deadly epidemic hit Rome and at least 170 women were executed for causing it by veneficium. In 184–180 BC, another epidemic hit Italy, and about 5,000 people were brought to trial and executed for veneficium. If the reports are accurate, writes Hutton, "then the Republican Romans hunted witches on a scale unknown anywhere else in the ancient world".

Under the Lex Cornelia de sicariis et veneficis of 81 BC, killing by veneficium carried the death penalty. This law banned the trading and possession of harmful drugs and poisons, possession of magical books and other occult paraphernalia. Emperor Augustus strengthened laws to curb these practices, for instance in 31 BC, by burning over 2,000 magical books in Rome, except for certain portions of the hallowed Sibylline Books. While Tiberius Claudius was emperor, 85 women and 45 men accused of sorcery were executed. By the 3rd century AD, the Lex Cornelia had begun to be used more broadly against other kinds of magic deemed harmful. This included potions and expanded to the creation, possession and use of magical books. The punishment for this crime varied amongst the classes. Poor magicians would receive the death penalty for their crime while rich magicians would have their relations and land taken away. Any magician who sold their practices was burned at the stake.

Persecution of witches continued in the Roman Empire until the late 4th century AD and abated only after the introduction of Christianity as the Roman state religion in the 390s.

=== Middle Ages ===
==== Christianisation in the Early Middle Ages ====
The German author Wilhelm Gottlieb Soldan argued in History of the Witchcraft Trials that the philosopher and mathematician Hypatia, murdered by a mob in 415 AD for threatening the influence of Cyril of Alexandria, may have been, in effect, the first famous "witch" to be punished by Christian authorities. Cyril's alleged role in her murder, however, was already controversial among contemporary sources, and the surviving primary account by Socrates Scholasticus makes no mention of religious motivations.

The 6th century AD Getica of Jordanes records a persecution and expulsion of witches among the Goths in a mythical account of the origin of the Huns. The ancient fabled King Filimer is said to have

found among his people certain witches, whom he called in his native tongue Haliurunnae. Suspecting these women, he expelled them from the midst of his race and compelled them to wander in solitary exile afar from his army. There the unclean spirits, who beheld them as they wandered through the wilderness, bestowed their embraces upon them and begat this savage race, which dwelt at first in the swamps, a stunted, foul and puny tribe, scarcely human, and having no language save one which bore but slight resemblance to human speech.

The Councils of Elvira (306 AD), Ancyra (314 AD), and Trullo (692 AD) imposed certain ecclesiastical penances for devil-worship. This mild approach represented the view of the Church for many centuries. The general desire of the Catholic Church's clergy to check fanaticism about witchcraft and necromancy is shown in the decrees of the Council of Paderborn, which, in 785 AD, explicitly outlawed condemning people as witches and condemned to death anyone who burnt a witch. The Lombard code of 643 AD states:

Let nobody presume to kill a foreign serving maid or female servant as a witch, for it is not possible, nor ought to be believed by Christian minds.

This conforms to the teachings of the Canon Episcopi of circa 900 AD (alleged to date from 314 AD), which, stated that witchcraft did not exist and that to teach that it was a reality was, itself, false and heterodox teaching. Other examples include an Irish synod in 800 AD, and a sermon by Agobard of Lyon (810 AD). (Note: A crown witness of 'Carolingian skepticism', Archbishop Agobard of Lyon (769–840 AD), reports witch panics during the reign of Charlemagne. In his sermon on hailstorms he reports frequent lynchings of supposed weather magicians (tempestarii), as well as of sorcerers, who were made responsible for a terrible livestock mortality in 810 AD. According to Agobard, the common people in their fury over crop failure had developed the extravagant idea that foreigners were secretly coming with airships to strip their fields of crops, and transmit it to Magonia. These anxieties resulted in severe aggression, and on one occasion around 816 AD, Agobard could hardly prevent a crowd from killing three foreign men and women, perceived as Magonian people. As their supposed homeland's name suggests, the crop failure was associated with magic. The bishop emphasized that thunderstorms were caused exclusively by natural or divine agencies.)

King Kálmán (Coloman) of Hungary, in Decree 57 of his First Legislative Book (published in 1100), banned witch-hunting because he said, "witches do not exist". The "Decretum" of Burchard, Bishop of Worms (about 1020), and especially its 19th book, often known separately as the "Corrector", is another work of great importance. Burchard was writing against the superstitious belief in magical potions, for instance, that may produce impotence or abortion. These were also condemned by several Church Fathers. But he altogether rejected the possibility of many of the alleged powers with which witches were popularly credited. Such, for example, were nocturnal riding through the air, the changing of a person's disposition from love to hate, the control of thunder, rain, and sunshine, the transformation of a man into an animal, the intercourse of incubi and succubi with human beings, and other such superstitions. Not only the attempt to practice such things, but the very belief in their possibility, is treated by Burchard as false and superstitious.

Pope Gregory VII, in 1080, wrote to King Harald III of Denmark forbidding witches to be put to death upon being suspected of having caused storms or failure of crops or pestilence. There were many such efforts to prevent unjust treatment of innocent people. (Note: See, for example, the Weihenstephan case discussed by Weiland in the Zeitschrift für Kirchengeschichte, IX, 592. "In 1080 Harold of Denmark (r. 1076–80) was admonished not to hold old women and Christian priests responsible for storms and diseases, or to slaughter them in the cruelest manner. Like Agobard before him, Pope Gregory VII (r. 1073–85) declared in his letter to the Danish king that these catastrophes were caused by God alone, that they were God's punishment for human sins, and that the killing of the innocent would only increase His fury.") On many occasions, ecclesiastics who spoke with authority did their best to disabuse the people of their superstitious belief in witchcraft. A comparable situation in Russia is suggested in a sermon by Serapion of Vladimir (written in 1274~1275), where the popular superstition of witches causing crop failures is denounced. (Note: "Witches were executed at Novgorod in 1227, and after a severe famine in the years 1271–1274 Bishop Serapion of Vladimir asked in a sermon: 'you believe in witchcraft and burn innocent people and bring down murder upon earth and the city ... Out of what books or writings do you learn that famine in earth is brought about by witchcraft?'")

Condemnations of witchcraft are nevertheless found in the writings of Augustine of Hippo and early theologians, who made little distinction between witchcraft and the practices of pagan religions. Many believed witchcraft did not exist in a philosophical sense: Witchcraft was based on illusions and powers of evil, which Augustine likened to darkness, a non-entity representing the absence of light. Augustine and his adherents like Saint Thomas Aquinas nevertheless promulgated elaborate demonologies, including the belief that humans could enter pacts with demons, which became the basis of future witch hunts. Ironically, many clerics of the Middle Ages openly or covertly practiced goetia, believing that as Christ granted his disciples power to command demons, to summon and control demons was not, therefore, a sin.

Whatever the position of individual clerics, witch-hunting seems to have persisted as a cultural phenomenon. Throughout the early medieval period, notable rulers prohibited both witchcraft and pagan religions, often on pain of death. Under Charlemagne, for example, Christians who practiced witchcraft were enslaved by the Church, while those who worshiped the Devil (Germanic gods) were killed outright. Witch-hunting also appears in period literature. According to Snorri Sturluson, King Olaf Trygvasson furthered the Christian conversion of Norway by luring pagan magicians to his hall under false pretenses, barring the doors and burning them alive. Some who escaped were later captured and drowned.

Early secular laws against witchcraft include those promulgated by King Athelstan (924–939):

And we have ordained respecting witch-crafts, and lybacs [read lyblac "sorcery"], and morthdaeds ["murder, mortal sin"]: if any one should be thereby killed, and he could not deny it, that he be liable in his life. But if he will deny it, and at threefold ordeal shall be guilty; that he be 120 days in prison: and after that let kindred take him out, and give to the king 120 shillings, and pay the wer to his kindred, and enter into borh for him, that he evermore desist from the like.

In some prosecutions for witchcraft, torture (permitted by the Roman civil law) apparently took place. However, Pope Nicholas I (866 AD), prohibited the use of torture altogether, and a similar decree may be found in the Pseudo-Isidorian Decretals.

==== Later Middle Ages ====
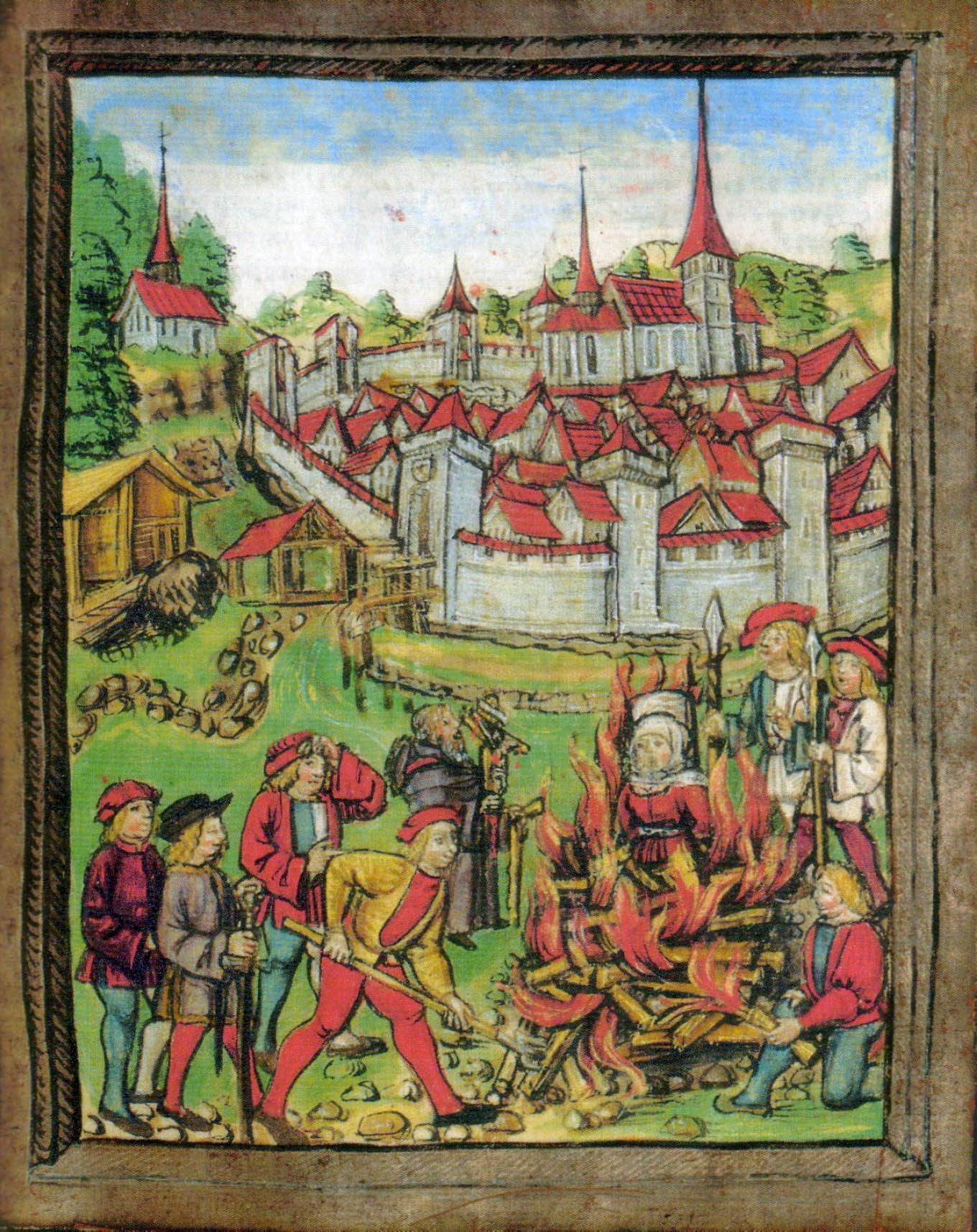
The burning of a woman in Willisau, Switzerland, 1447

The manuals of the Roman Catholic Inquisition remained highly skeptical of witch accusations, although there was sometimes an overlap between accusations of heresy and of witchcraft, particularly when, in the 13th century, the newly formed Inquisition was commissioned to deal with the Cathars of Southern France, whose teachings were charged with including witchcraft and magic. Although it has been proposed that the witch-hunt developed in Europe from the early 14th century, after the Cathars and the Knights Templar were suppressed, this hypothesis has been rejected independently by virtually all academic historians (Cohn 1975; Kieckhefer 1976).

In 1258, Pope Alexander IV declared that Inquisition would not deal with cases of witchcraft unless they were related to heresy. (Note: "There would be no witch persecutions of the sort he envisaged. The Gregorian Inquisition had been established to deal with the religious matter of heresy, not the secular issue of witchcraft. Pope Alexander IV spelled this out clearly in a 1258 canon which forbade inquisitions into sorcery unless there was also manifest heresy. And this view was even confirmed and acknowledged by the infamous inquisitor Bernard Gui (immortalised by Umberto Eco in The Name of the Rose), who wrote in his influential inquisitors' manual that, by itself, sorcery did not come within the Inquisition's jurisdiction. In sum, the Church did not want the Inquisition sucked into witch trials, which were for the secular courts.") Although Pope John XXII had later authorized the Inquisition to prosecute sorcerers in 1320, inquisitorial courts rarely dealt with witchcraft save incidentally when investigating heterodoxy.

In the case of the Madonna Oriente, the Inquisition of Milan was not sure what to do with two women who, in 1384, confessed to have participated in the society around Signora Oriente or Diana. Through their confessions, both of them conveyed the traditional folk beliefs of white magic. The women were accused again in 1390, and condemned by the inquisitor. They were eventually executed by the secular arm.

In a notorious case in 1425, Hermann II, Count of Celje accused his daughter-in-law Veronika of Desenice of witchcraft – and, though she was acquitted by the court, he had her murdered by drowning. The accusations of witchcraft are, in this case, considered to have been a pretext for Hermann to get rid of an "unsuitable match," Veronika being born into the lower nobility and thus "unworthy" of his son.

A Catholic figure who preached against witchcraft was popular Franciscan preacher Bernardino of Siena (1380–1444). Bernardino's sermons reveal both a phenomenon of superstitious practices and an over-reaction against them by the common people. However, it is clear that Bernardino had in mind not merely the use of spells and enchantments and such like fooleries but much more serious crimes, chiefly murder and infanticide. This is clear from his much-quoted sermon of 1427, in which he says:

One of them told and confessed, without any pressure, that she had killed thirty children by bleeding them ... [and] she confessed more, saying she had killed her own son ... Answer me: does it really seem to you that someone who has killed twenty or thirty little children in such a way has done so well that when finally they are accused before the Signoria you should go to their aid and beg mercy for them?

Perhaps the most notorious witch trial in history was the trial of Joan of Arc. Although the trial was politically motivated, and the verdict later overturned, the position of Joan as a woman and an accused witch became significant factors in her execution. Joan's punishment of being burned alive (victims were usually strangled before burning) was reserved solely for witches and heretics, the implication being that a burned body could not be resurrected on Judgment Day.

==== Transition to the early modern witch-hunts ====
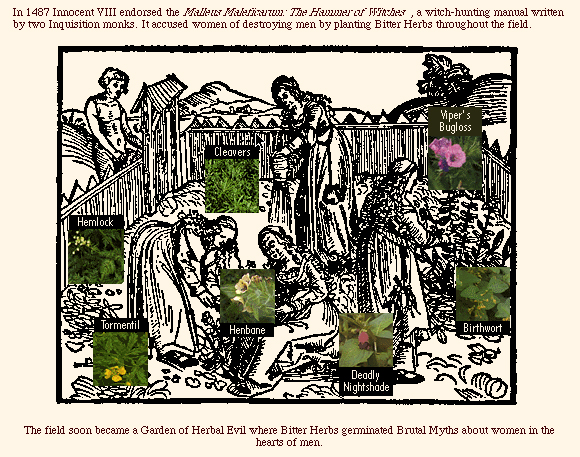
The Malleus Maleficarum (the 'Hammer of Witches'), published in 1487, accused women of destroying men by planting bitter herbs throughout the field.

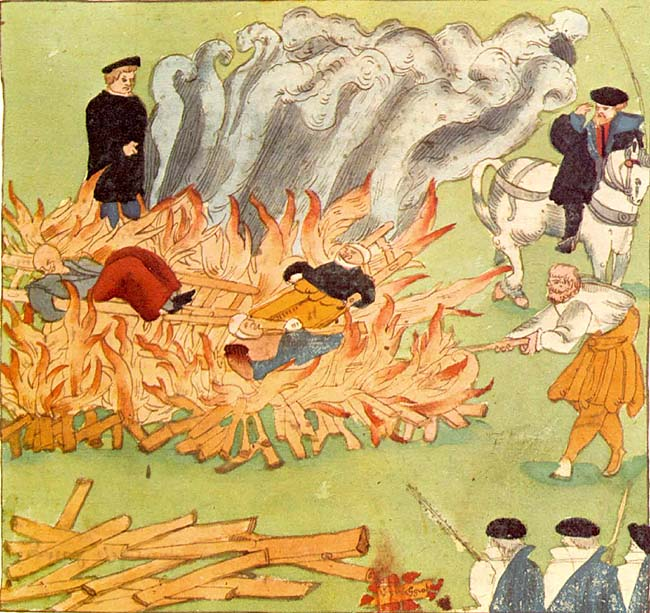
Burning of three witches in Baden, Switzerland (1585), by Johann Jakob Wick

The resurgence of witch-hunts at the end of the medieval period, taking place with at least partial support or at least tolerance on the part of the Church, was accompanied with a number of developments in Christian doctrine, for example, the recognition of the existence of witchcraft as a form of Satanic influence and its classification as a heresy. As Renaissance occultism gained traction among the educated classes, the belief in witchcraft, which in the medieval period had been part of the folk religion of the uneducated rural population at best, was incorporated into an increasingly comprehensive theology of Satan as the ultimate source of all maleficium. (Note: Early Christian theologians attributed to the Devil responsibility for persecution, heresy, witchcraft, sin, natural disasters, human calamities, and whatever else went wrong. One tragic consequence of this was a tendency to demonize people accused of wrongs. At the instance of ecclesiastical leaders, the state burned heretics and witches, burning symbolizing the fate deserved by the demonic. Popular fears, stirred to fever pitch in the 14th and 15th centuries, sustained frenzied efforts to wipe out heretics, witches, and unbelievers, especially Jews.) (Note: Trevor-Roper has said that it was necessary for belief in the Kingdom of Satan to die before the witch theory could be discredited.) These doctrinal shifts were completed in the mid-15th century, specifically in the wake of the Council of Basel and centered on the Duchy of Savoy in the western Alps, (Note: We are reasonably confident today that the 'classical' doctrine of witchcraft crystallized during the middle third of the 15th century, shortly after the Council of Basel, primarily within a western Alpine zone centred around the duchy of Savoy (Ostorero et al. 1999).) leading to an early series of witch trials by both secular and ecclesiastical courts in the second half of the 15th century. (Note: By the end of the 15th century, scattered trials for witchcraft by both secular and ecclesiastical courts occurred in many places from the Pyrenees, where the Spanish Inquisition had become involved, to the North Sea.)

In 1484, Pope Innocent VIII issued Summis desiderantes affectibus, a Papal bull authorizing the "correcting, imprisoning, punishing and chastising" of devil-worshippers who have "slain infants", among other crimes. He did so at the request of inquisitor Heinrich Kramer, who had been refused permission by the local bishops in Germany to investigate. However, historians such as Ludwig von Pastor insist that the bull neither allowed anything new, nor was necessarily binding on Catholic consciences. (Note: "The Bull contains no dogmatic decision of any sort on witchcraft. It assumes the possibility of demoniacal influences on human beings which the Church has always maintained, but claims no dogmatic authority for its pronouncement on the particular cases with which it was dealing at the moment. The form of the document, which refers only to certain occurrences which had been brought to the knowledge of the Pope, sh[o]ws that it was not intended to bind any one to believe in the things mentioned in it. The question whether the Pope himself believed in them has nothing to do with the subject. His judgment on this point has no greater importance than attaches to a Papal decree in any other undogmatic question, e.g., on a dispute about a benefice. The Bull introduced no new element into the current beliefs about witchcraft. It is absurd to accuse it of being the cause of the cruel treatment of witches, when we see in the Sachsenspiegel that burning alive was already the legal punishment for a witch. All that Innocent VIII. did was to confirm the jurisdiction of the inquisitors over these cases. The Bull simply empowered them to try all matters concerning witchcraft, without exception, before their own tribunals, by Canon-law; a process which was totally different from that of the later trials. Possibly the Bull, in so far as it admonished the inquisitors to be on the alert in regard to witchcraft may have given an impetus to the prosecution of such cases; but it affords no justification for the accusation that it introduced a new crime, or was in any way responsible for the iniquitous horrors of the witch-harrying of later times.") Three years later in 1487, Kramer published the notorious Malleus Maleficarum (lit., 'Hammer against the Evildoers') which, because of the newly invented printing presses, enjoyed a wide readership. The book was condemned by top theologians of the Inquisition at the Faculty of Cologne for recommending illegal procedures and for being inconsistent with Catholic teaching. Despite this, it was reprinted in 14 editions by 1520 and became unduly influential in the secular courts.

In Europe, the witch-hunt craze was negligible in Spain, Poland, and Eastern Europe; conversely, it was intense in Germany, Switzerland, and France.

=== Early Modern Europe and Colonial America ===
The witch trials in Early Modern Europe came in waves and then subsided. There were trials in the 15th and early 16th centuries, but then the witch scare went into decline, before becoming a major issue again and peaking in the 17th century, particularly during the Thirty Years' War. What had previously been a belief that some people possessed supernatural abilities (which were sometimes used to protect the people), now became a sign of a pact between the people with supernatural abilities and the devil. To justify the killings, some Christians of the time and their proxy secular institutions deemed witchcraft as being associated to wild Satanic ritual parties in which there was naked dancing and cannibalistic infanticide. It was also seen as heresy for going against the first of the Ten Commandments ("You shall have no other gods before me") or as violating majesty, in this case referring to the divine majesty, not the worldly. Further scripture was also frequently cited, especially the Exodus decree that "thou shalt not suffer a witch to live" (Exodus 22:18), which many supported.

Witch-hunts were seen across early modern Europe, but the most significant area of witch-hunting in modern Europe is often considered to be central and southern Germany. Germany was a late starter in terms of the numbers of trials, compared to other regions of Europe. Witch-hunts first appeared in large numbers in southern France and Switzerland during the 14th and 15th centuries. The peak years of witch-hunts in southwest Germany were from 1561 to 1670. In the Catalan Pyrenees during the Kingdom of Aragon, in 1424 the Code of Ordinances of the Àneu Valleys were enacted and is the first legal text in Europe that specifically addresses the persecution of witchcraft and provides insight into medieval legislation related to the phenomenon of witchcraft. The first major persecution in Europe, when witches were caught, tried, convicted, and burned in the imperial lordship of Wiesensteig in southwestern Germany, is recorded in 1563 in a pamphlet called "True and Horrifying Deeds of 63 Witches". Witchcraft persecution spread to all areas of Europe. Learned European ideas about witchcraft and demonological ideas, strongly influenced the hunt for witches in the North. These witch-hunts were at least partly driven by economic factors since a significant relationship between economic pressure and witch hunting activity can be found for regions such as Bavaria and Scotland.

In Denmark, the burning of witches increased following the reformation of 1536. Christian IV of Denmark, in particular, encouraged this practice, and hundreds of people were convicted of witchcraft and burnt. In the district of Finnmark, northern Norway, severe witchcraft trials took place during the period 1600–1692. A memorial of international format, Steilneset Memorial, has been built to commemorate the victims of the Finnmark witchcraft trials. In England, the Witchcraft Act 1541 regulated the penalties for witchcraft. In the North Berwick witch trials in Scotland, over 70 people were accused of witchcraft on account of bad weather when James VI of Scotland, who shared the Danish king's interest in witch trials, sailed to Denmark in 1590 to meet his betrothed Anne of Denmark. According to a widely circulated pamphlet, "Newes from Scotland," James VI personally presided over the torture and execution of Doctor Fian. Indeed, James published a witch-hunting manual, Daemonologie, which contains the famous dictum: "Experience daily proves how loath they are to confess without torture." Later, the Pendle witch trials of 1612 joined the ranks of the most famous witch trials in English history.

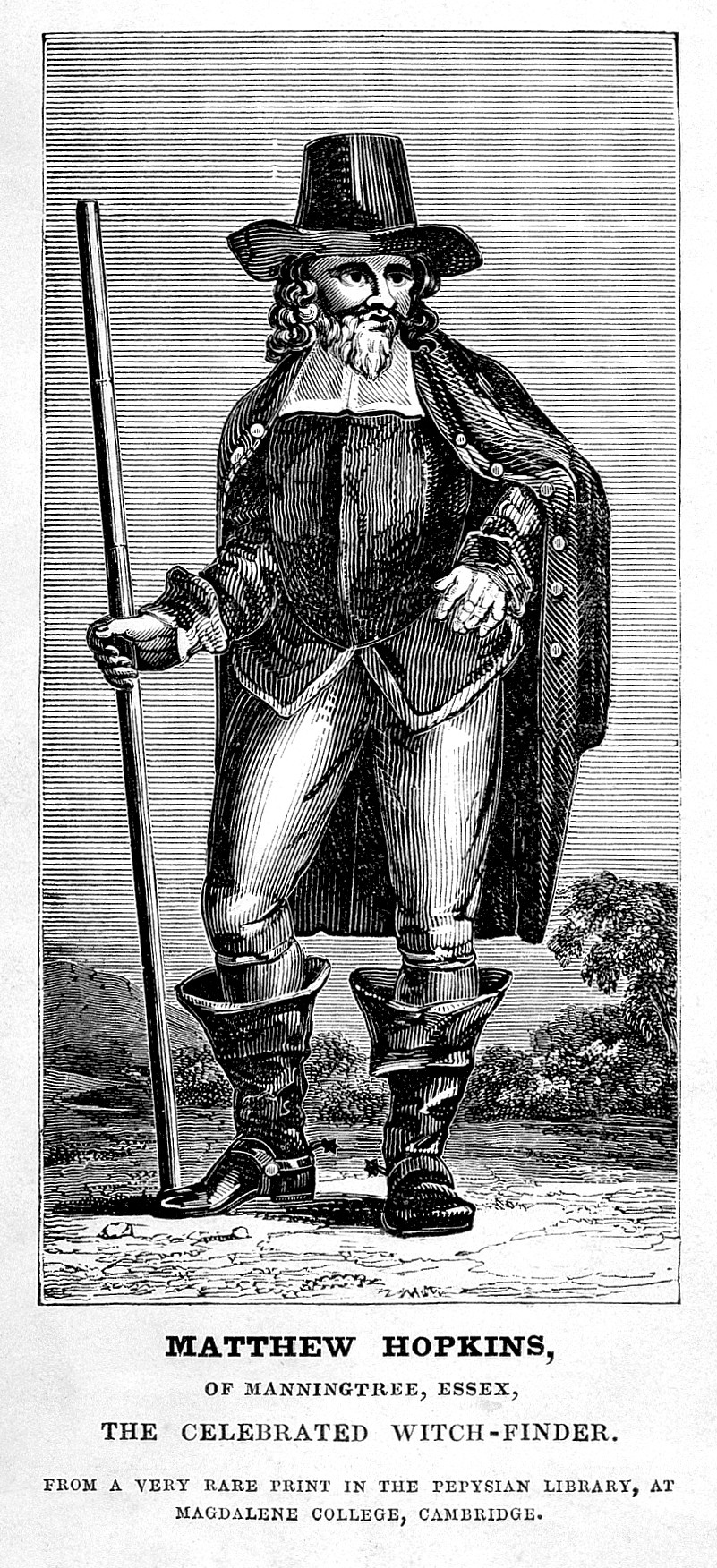
A portrait of Matthew Hopkins, the self-styled Witchfinder General, who was mainly active in East Anglia

In England, witch-hunting would reach its apex in 1644 to 1647 due to the efforts of Puritan Matthew Hopkins. Although operating without an official Parliament commission, Hopkins (calling himself Witchfinder General) and his accomplices charged hefty fees to towns during the English Civil War. Hopkins' witch-hunting spree was brief but significant: several hundred convictions and deaths are attributed to his work. Hopkins wrote a book on his methods, describing his fortuitous beginnings as a witch-hunter, the methods used to extract confessions, and the tests he employed to test the accused: stripping them naked to find the Witches' mark, the "swimming" test, and pricking the skin. The swimming test, which included throwing a witch, who was strapped to a chair, into a bucket of water to see if she floated, was discontinued in 1645 due to a legal challenge. The 1647 book, The Discovery of Witches, soon became an influential legal text. The book was used in the American colonies as early as May 1647, when Margaret Jones was executed for witchcraft in Massachusetts, the first of 17 people executed for witchcraft in the Colonies from 1647 to 1663.

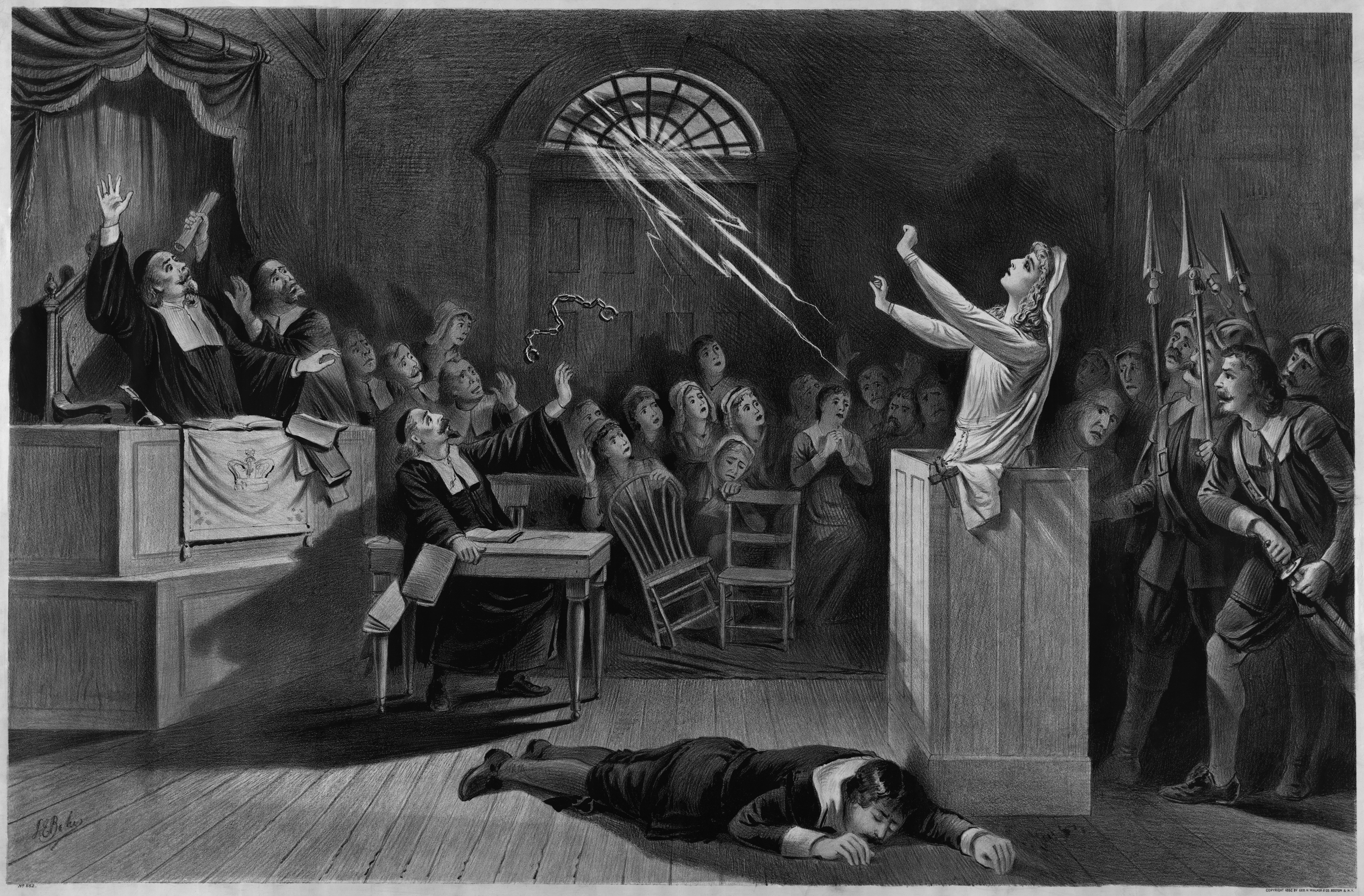
1892 lithograph depicting the Salem witch trials of 1692–1693

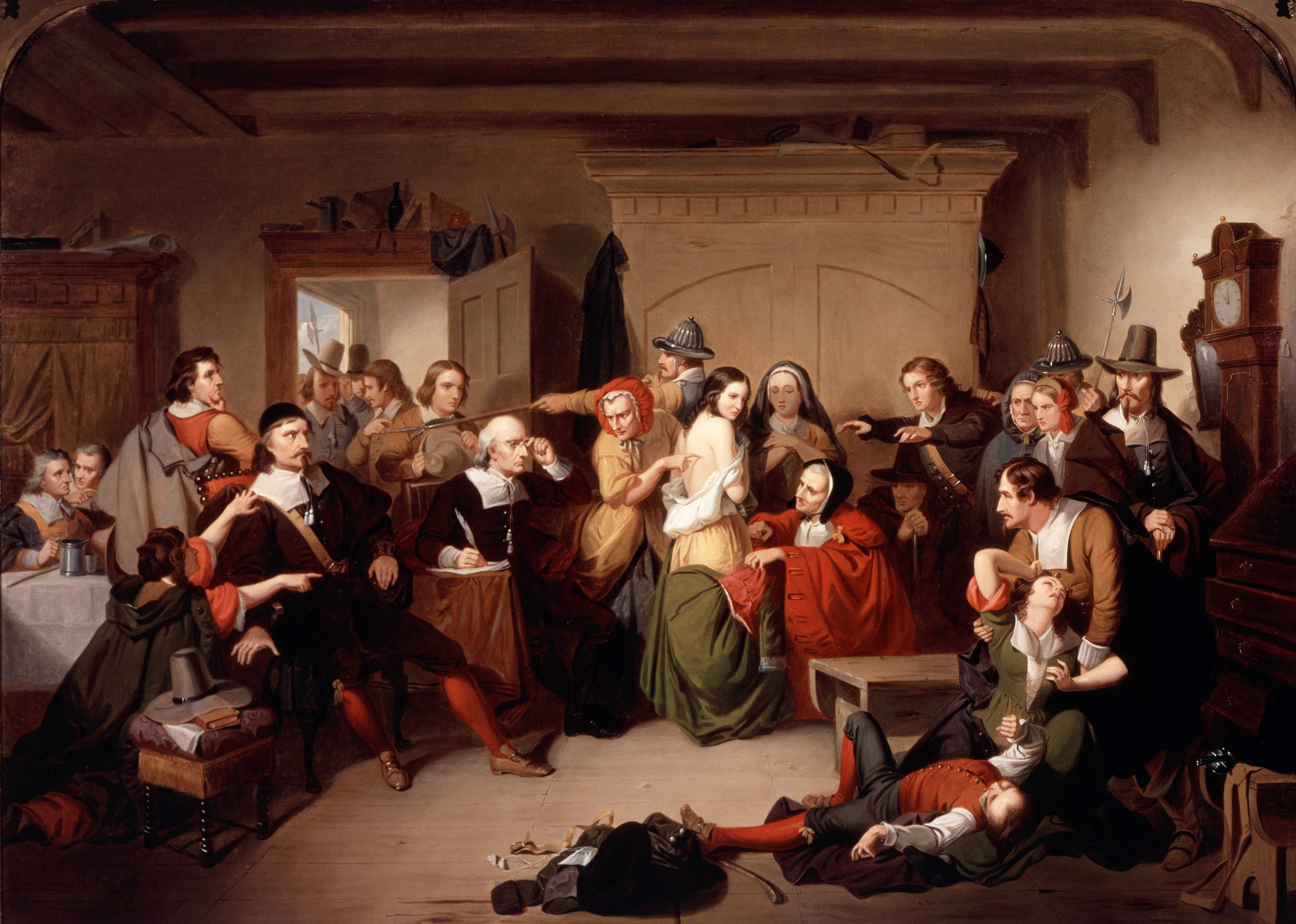
Examination of a Witch in the 17th century (1853), by T. H. Matteson

Witch-hunts began to occur in North America while Hopkins was hunting witches in England. In 1645, forty-six years before the notorious Salem witch trials, Springfield, Massachusetts experienced America's first accusations of witchcraft when husband and wife Hugh and Mary Parsons accused each other of witchcraft. In America's first witch trial, Hugh was found innocent, while Mary was acquitted of witchcraft but she was still sentenced to be hanged as punishment for the death of her child. She died in prison. About eighty people throughout the Puritan-controlled Massachusetts Bay Colony were accused of practicing witchcraft; thirteen women and two men were executed in a witch-hunt that occurred throughout New England and lasted from 1645 to 1663. The Salem witch trials followed in 1692–1693 with 19 victims convicted and given the death penalty.

Current scholarly estimates of the number of people who were executed for witchcraft vary from about 35,000 to 60,000. The total number of witch trials in Europe which are known to have ended in executions is around 12,000. Prominent contemporaneous critics of witch-hunts included Gianfrancesco Ponzinibio (fl. 1520), Johannes Wier (1515–1588), Reginald Scot (1538–1599), Cornelius Loos (1546–1595), Anton Praetorius (1560–1613), Alonso Salazar y Frías (1564–1636), Friedrich Spee (1591–1635), and Balthasar Bekker (1634–1698). Among the largest and most notable of these trials were the Trier witch trials (1581–1593), the Fulda witch trials (1603–1606), the Würzburg witch trial (1626–1631) and the Bamberg witch trials (1626–1631).

In addition to known witch trials, witch hunts were often conducted by vigilantes, who may or may not have executed their victims. In Scotland, for example, cattle murrains were blamed on witches, usually peasant women, who were then punished. A popular method called "scoring above the breath" meant slashing across a woman's forehead in order to remove the power of her magic. This was seen as a kind of emergency procedure which could be performed in absence of judicial authorities.

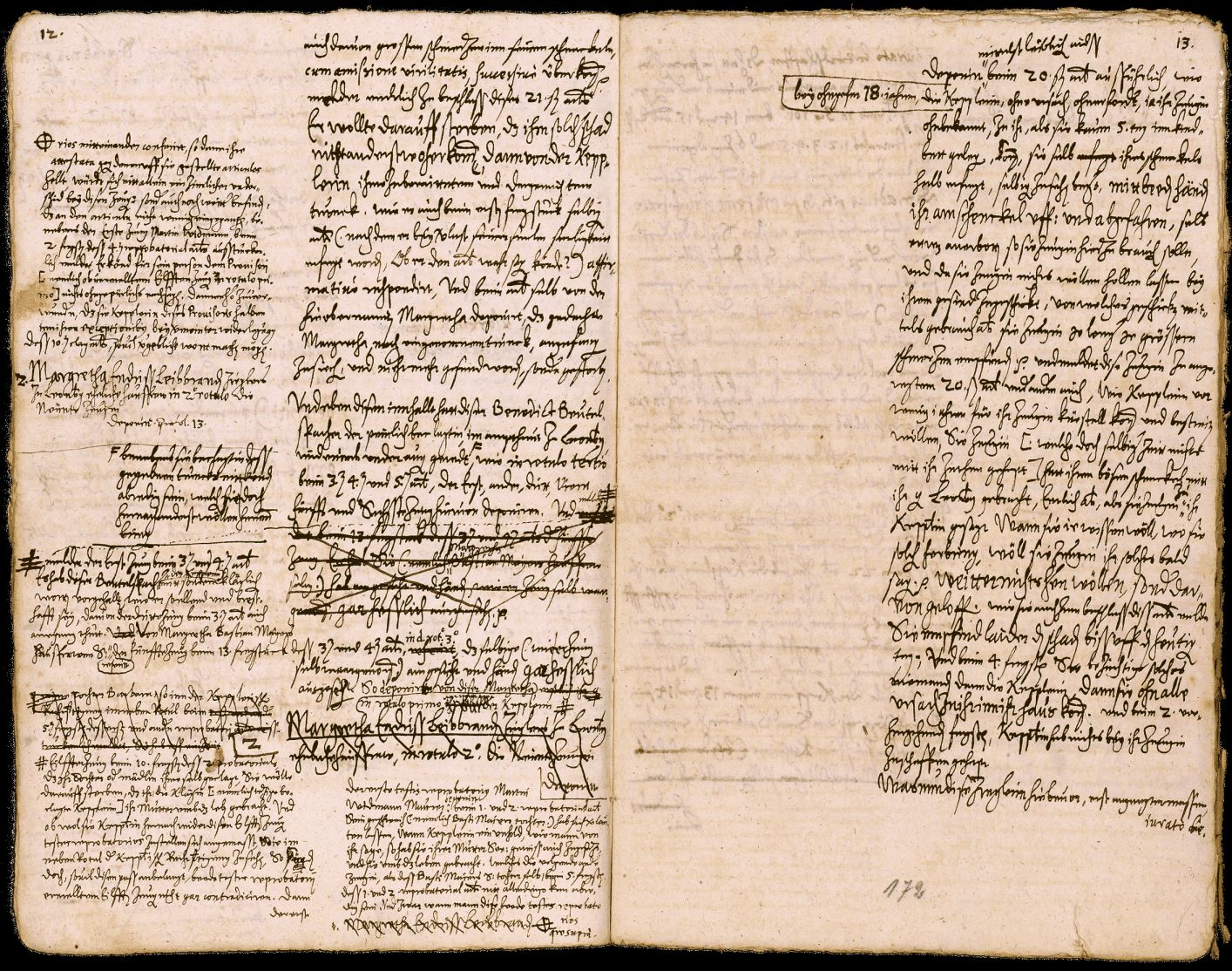
Witness testimony from the witch trial against Katharina Kepler, 14 July 1621

Another important element of the persecution of witches were denunciations. "In England, most of the accusers and those making written complaints against witches were women." Informers did not have to be revealed to the accused, which was important for the success of the witch trials. In practice, appeals were made to other witnesses to the crimes, so that the first informer was followed by others. In the event of a conviction, the informer sometimes received a third of the accused's assets, but at least 2 guilders. A well-known and well-documented example is the case of Katharina Kepler, the mother of the astronomer Johannes Kepler, for being in a pact with the devil and using witchcraft. In 1615, she was called a witch by a female neighbor in the duchy of Württemberg following a dispute with her of having given her a bitter drink that had made her ill. She was held captive for over a year and threatened with torture, but was finally acquitted thanks to her son's efforts.

==== Execution statistics ====
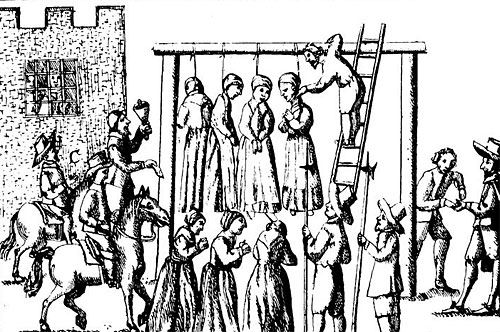
An image of suspected witches being hanged in England, published in 1655 during Puritan rule

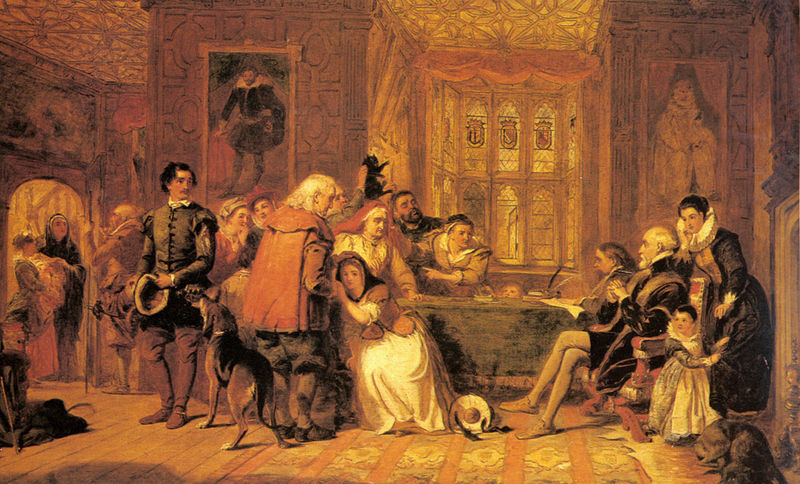
The Witch Trial by William Powell Frith (1848)

Modern scholarly estimates place the total number of executions for witchcraft in the 300-year period of European witch-hunts in the five digits, mostly at roughly between 35,000 and 60,000 (see table below for details), The majority of those accused were from the lower economic classes in European society, although in rarer cases high-ranking individuals were accused as well. On the basis of this evidence, Scarre and Callow asserted that the "typical witch was the wife or widow of an agricultural labourer or small tenant farmer, and she was well known for a quarrelsome and aggressive nature."

According to Julian Goodare, in Europe overall, 80% of those who were persecuted as witches were women, although there were countries and regions like Estonia, Normandy and Iceland, that targeted men more. In Iceland 92% of the accused were men, in Estonia 60%, and in Moscow two-thirds of those accused were male. In Finland, a total of more than 100 death row inmates were roughly equal in both men and women, but all Ålanders sentenced to witchcraft were only women.

At one point during the Würzburg trials of 1629, children made up 60% of those accused, although this had declined to 17% by the end of the year. Rapley (1998) claims that "75 to 80 percent" of a total of "40,000 to 50,000" victims were women. The claim that "millions of witches" (often: "nine million witches") were killed in Europe is spurious, even though it is occasionally found in popular literature, and it is ultimately due to a 1791 pamphlet by Gottfried Christian Voigt.

Prosecution of witchcraft in regions of Europe 1450–1750
Region	Trials (approx)	Executions (approx)
British Isles	5,000	1,500–2,000
Holy Roman Empire (Germany, Netherlands, Switzerland, Lorraine, Austria, Czechia)	50,000	25,000–30,000
France	3,000	1,000
Scandinavia	5,000	1,700–2,000
Central & Eastern Europe (Poland-Lithuania, Hungary, Russia)	7,000	2,000
Southern Europe (Spain, Portugal, Italy)	10,000	1,000
Total	80,000	35,000

=== End of European witch-hunts in the 18th century ===
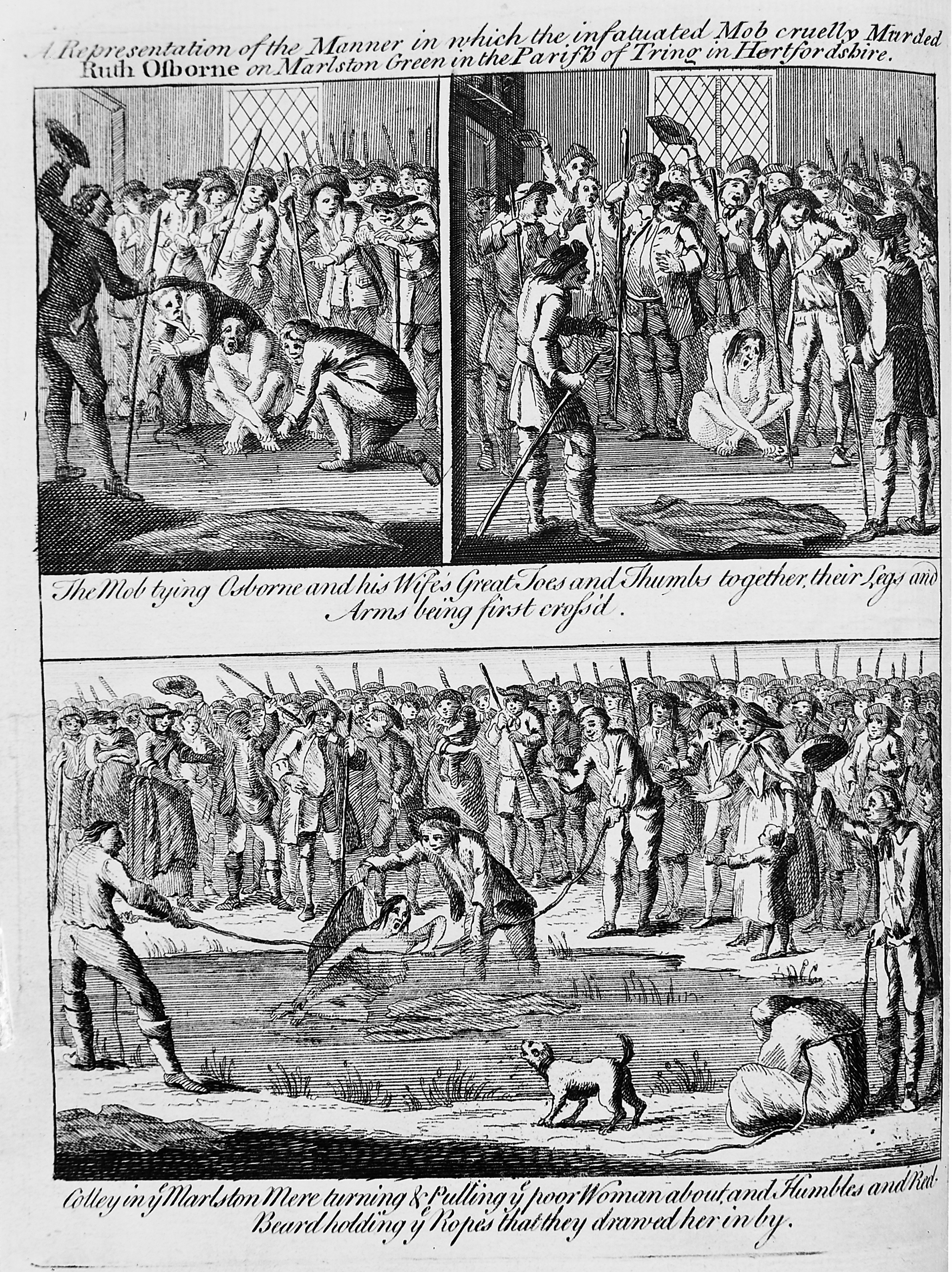
The drowning of an alleged witch, with Thomas Colley as the incitor.

In England and Scotland between 1542 and 1735, a series of Witchcraft Acts enshrined into law the punishment (often with death, sometimes with incarceration) of individuals practising or claiming to practice witchcraft and magic. The last executions for witchcraft in England had taken place in 1682, when Temperance Lloyd, Mary Trembles, and Susanna Edwards were executed at Exeter. In 1711, Joseph Addison published an article in the highly respected The Spectator journal (No. 117) criticizing the irrationality and social injustice in treating elderly and feeble women (dubbed "Moll White") as witches. Jane Wenham was among the last subjects of a typical witch trial in England in 1712, but was pardoned after her conviction and set free. Janet Horne was executed for witchcraft in Scotland in 1727. The final act, the Witchcraft Act 1735, led to prosecution for fraud rather than witchcraft since it was no longer believed that the individuals had actual supernatural powers or traffic with Satan. The 1735 act continued to be used until the 1940s to prosecute individuals such as spiritualists and gypsies. The act was finally repealed in 1951.

The last execution of a witch in the Dutch Republic was probably in 1613. In Denmark, this took place in 1693 with the execution of Anna Palles and in Norway the last witch execution was of Johanne Nilsdatter in 1695, and in Sweden Anna Eriksdotter in 1704. In other parts of Europe, the practice died down later. In France the last person to be executed for witchcraft was Louis Debaraz in 1745.

In Croatia the last person condemned for witchcraft to the death penalty was Magda Logomer in 1758. She was acquitted by Maria Theresa in 1758, putting an end to the witch trials in Croatia.

In Germany the last death sentence was that of Anna Schwegelin in Kempten in 1775 (although not carried out).

The last known official witch-trial was the Doruchów witch trial in Poland in 1783. The result of the trial is questioned by Prof. Janusz Tazbir in his book. No reliable sources had been found confirming any executions after the trial. In 1793, two unnamed women were executed in proceedings of dubious legitimacy in Poznań, Poland.

Anna Göldi was executed in Glarus, Switzerland in 1782 and Barbara Zdunk in Prussia in 1811. Both women have been identified as the last women executed for witchcraft in Europe, but in both cases, the official verdict did not mention witchcraft, as this had ceased to be recognized as a criminal offense.

=== India ===
There is no documented evidence of witch-hunting in India before 1792. The earliest evidence of witch-hunts in India can be found in the Santhal Witch Trials in 1792. In the Singhbhum District of the Chota Nagpur Division in Company-ruled India, not only were those accused of being witches murdered, but also those related to the accused to ensure that they would not avenge the deaths (Roy Choudhary 1958: 88). The Chhotanagpur region was majorly populated by an adivasi population called the Santhals. The existence of witches was a belief central to the Santhals. Witches were feared and were supposed to be engaged in anti-social activities. They were also supposed to have the power to kill people by feeding on their entrails, and causing fevers in cattle among other evils. Therefore, according to the adivasi population the cure to their disease and sickness was the elimination of these witches who were seen as the cause.

The practice of witch-hunt among Santhals was more brutal than that in Europe. Unlike Europe, where witches were strangulated before being burnt, the santhals forced them "..to eat human excreta and drink blood before throwing them into the flames."

The East India Company (EIC) banned the persecution of witches in Gujarat, Rajputana and Chota Nagpur Division in the 1840s–1850s. Despite the ban, very few cases were reported as witch-hunting was not seen as a crime. The Santhals believed that the ban in fact allowed the activities of witches to flourish. Thus, the effect of the ban was contrary to what the EIC had intended. During 1857–58, there was a surge in witch-hunting; coinciding during the period of the Indian Rebellion of 1857, which has led some scholars to see the resurgence of the activity as a form of resistance to Company rule.

== Modern cases ==
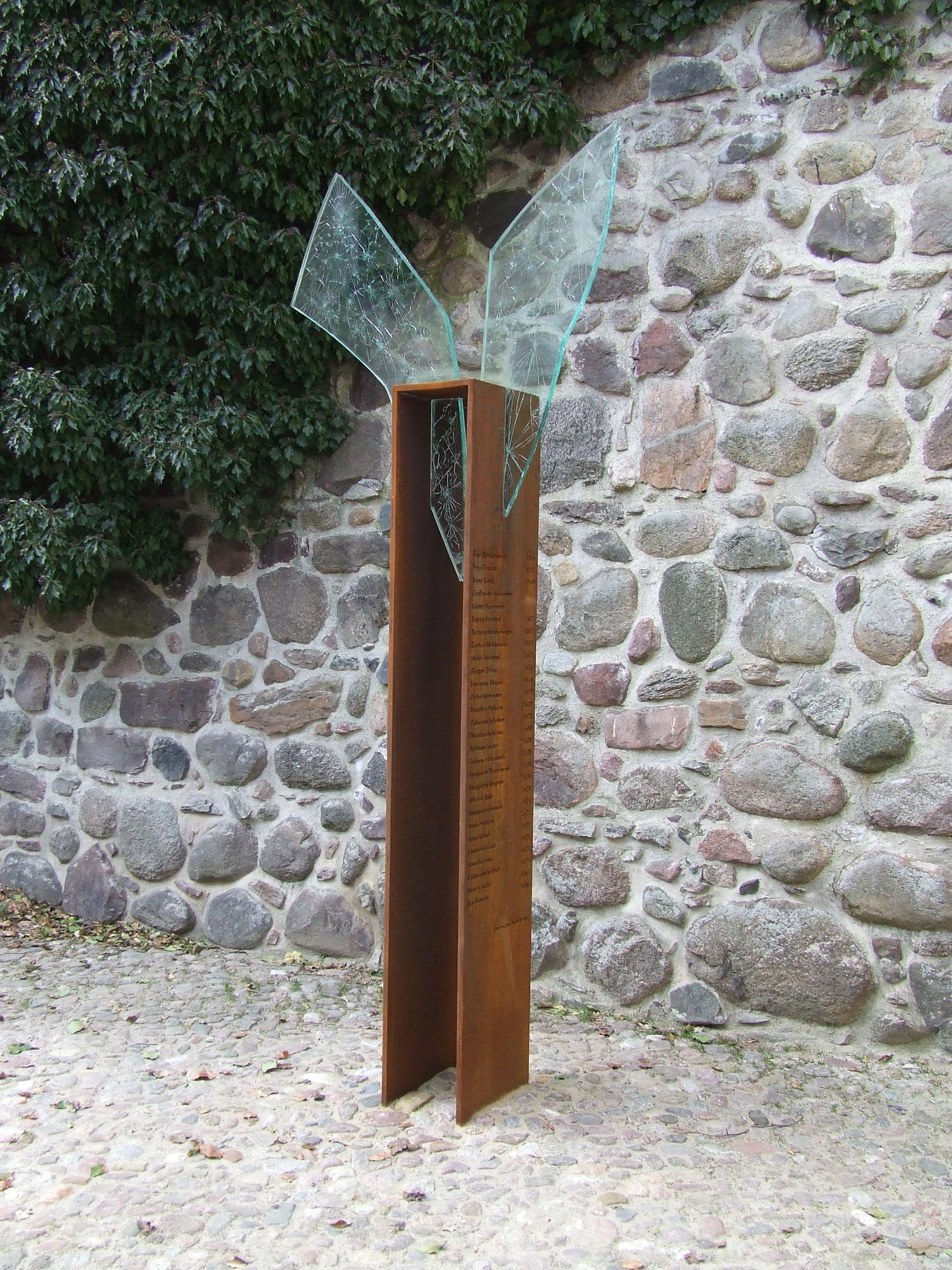
Monument for the victims of the witch-hunts of 16th- and 17th-century Bernau, Germany by Annelie Grund

Witch-hunts still occur today in societies where belief in magic is prevalent. In most cases, these are instances of lynching and burnings, reported with some regularity from much of Sub-Saharan Africa, from Saudi Arabia and from Papua New Guinea. In addition, there are some countries that have legislation against the practice of sorcery. The only country where witchcraft remains legally punishable by death is Saudi Arabia.

Witch-hunts in modern times are continuously reported by the United Nations High Commissioner for Refugees as a massive violation of human rights. Most of the accused are women and children but can also be elderly people or marginalised groups of the community such as albinos and the HIV-infected. These victims are often considered burdens to the community, and as a result are often driven out, starved to death, or killed violently, sometimes by their own families in acts of social cleansing. The causes of witch-hunts include poverty, epidemics, social crises and lack of education. The leader of the witch-hunt, often a prominent figure in the community or a "witch doctor", may also gain economic benefit by charging for an exorcism or by selling body parts of the murdered.

=== Middle East ===
==== Levant ====
On 29 and 30 June 2015, militants of the terrorist group ISIS beheaded two couples on accusations of sorcery and using "magic for medicine" in Deir ez-Zor province. Earlier on, the ISIL militants beheaded several "magicians" and street illusionists in Syria, Iraq and Libya.

==== Saudi Arabia ====
Witchcraft or sorcery remains a criminal offense in Saudi Arabia, although the precise nature of the crime is undefined.

The frequency of prosecutions for this in the country as whole is unknown. However, in November 2009, it was reported that 118 people had been arrested in the province of Makkah that year for practicing magic and "using the Book of Allah in a derogatory manner", 74% of them being female. According to Human Rights Watch in 2009, prosecutions for witchcraft and sorcery are proliferating and "Saudi courts are sanctioning a literal witch hunt by the religious police."

In 2006, an illiterate Saudi woman, Fawza Falih, was convicted of practising witchcraft, including casting an impotence spell, and sentenced to death by beheading, after allegedly being beaten and forced to fingerprint a false confession that had not been read to her. After an appeal court had cast doubt on the validity of the death sentence because the confession had been retracted, the lower court reaffirmed the same sentence on a different basis.

In 2007, Mustafa Ibrahim, an Egyptian national, was executed, having been convicted of using sorcery in an attempt to separate a married couple, as well as of adultery and of desecrating the Quran.

Also in 2007, Abdul Hamid Bin Hussain Bin Moustafa al-Fakki, a Sudanese national, was sentenced to death after being convicted of producing a spell that would lead to the reconciliation of a divorced couple.

In 2009, Ali Sibat, a Lebanese television presenter who had been arrested whilst on a pilgrimage in Saudi Arabia, was sentenced to death for witchcraft arising out of his fortune-telling on an Arab satellite channel. His appeal was accepted by one court, but a second in Medina upheld his death sentence again in March 2010, stating that he deserved it as he had publicly practised sorcery in front of millions of viewers for several years. In November 2010, the Supreme Court refused to ratify the death sentence, stating that there was insufficient evidence that his actions had harmed others.

On 12 December 2011, Amina bint Abdulhalim Nassar was beheaded in Al Jawf Province after being convicted of practicing witchcraft and sorcery. Another very similar situation occurred to Muree bin Ali bin Issa al-Asiri and he was beheaded on 19 June 2012 in the Najran Province.

=== Oceania ===
==== Papua New Guinea ====
Though the practice of "white" magic (such as faith healing) is legal in Papua New Guinea, the 1976 Sorcery Act imposed a penalty of up to 2 years in prison for the practice of "black" magic, until the Act was repealed in 2013. In 2009, the government reports that extrajudicial torture and murder of alleged witches – usually lone women – are spreading from the highland areas to cities as villagers migrate to urban areas. For example, in June 2013, four women were accused of witchcraft because the family "had a 'permanent house' made of wood, and the family had tertiary educations and high social standing". All of the women were tortured and Helen Rumbali was beheaded. Helen Hakena, chairwoman of the North Bougainville Human Rights Committee, said that the accusations started because of economic jealousy born of a mining boom.

Reports by U.N. agencies, Amnesty International, Oxfam and anthropologists show that "attacks on accused sorcerers and witches – sometimes men, but most commonly women – are frequent, ferocious and often fatal." It's estimated about 150 cases of violence and killings are occurring each year in just the province of Simbu in Papua New Guinea alone. Reports indicate this practice of witch-hunting has in some places evolved into "something more malignant, sadistic and voyeuristic." One woman who was attacked by young men from a nearby village "had her genitals burned and fused beyond functional repair by the repeated intrusions of red-hot irons." Few incidents are ever reported, according to the 2012 Law Reform Commission which concluded that they have increased since the 1980s.

=== Indian Subcontinent ===
==== India ====
Some people in India, mostly in villages, have the belief that witchcraft and black magic are effective. On one hand, people may seek advice from witch doctors for health, financial or marital problems. On the other hand, people, especially women, are accused of witchcraft and attacked, occasionally killed. It has been reported that mostly widows or divorcees are targeted to rob them of their property. Reportedly, revered village witch-doctors are paid to brand specific persons as witches (dayan), so that they can be killed without repercussions. The existing laws have been considered ineffective in curbing the murders. In June 2013, National Commission for Women (NCW) reported that according to National Crime Records Bureau (NCRB) statistics, 768 women had been murdered for allegedly practising witchcraft since 2008 and announced plans for newer laws.

===== Recent cases =====
Between 2001 and 2006, an estimated 300 people were killed in the state of Assam. Between 2005 and 2010, about 35 witchcraft related murders reportedly took place in Odisha's Sundergarh district. In October 2003, three women were branded as witch and humiliated, afterwards they all committed suicide in Kamalpura village in Muzaffarpur district in Bihar. In August 2013, a couple were hacked to death by a group of people in Kokrajhar district in Assam. In September 2013, in the Jashpur district of Chhattisgarh, a woman was murdered and her daughter was raped on the allegation that they were practising black magic.

A 2010 estimate places the number of women killed as witches in India at between 150 and 200 per year, or a total of 2,500 in the period of 1995 to 2009. The lynchings are particularly common in the poor northern states of Jharkhand, Bihar and the central state of Chhattisgarh. Witch hunts are also taking place among the tea garden workers in Jalpaiguri district, West Bengal. The witch hunts in Jalpaiguri are less known, but are motivated by the stress in the tea industry on the lives of the Adivasi (tribal) workers.

In India, labeling a woman as a witch is a common ploy to grab land, settle scores or even to punish her for turning down sexual advances. In a majority of the cases, it is difficult for the accused woman to reach out for help and she is forced to either abandon her home and family or driven to commit suicide. Most cases are not documented because it is difficult for poor and illiterate women to travel from isolated regions to file police reports. Less than 2 percent of those accused of witch-hunting are actually convicted, according to a study by the Free Legal Aid Committee, a group that works with victims in the state of Jharkhand.

==== Nepal ====
Witch-hunts in Nepal are common, and are targeted especially against low-caste women. The main causes of witchcraft-related violence include widespread belief in superstition, lack of education, lack of public awareness, illiteracy, caste system, male domination, and economic dependency of women on men. The victims of this form of violence are often beaten, tortured, publicly humiliated, and murdered. Sometimes, the family members of the accused are also assaulted. In 2010, Sarwa Dev Prasad Ojha, Minister for Women and Social Welfare, said, "Superstitions are deeply rooted in our society, and the belief in witchcraft is one of the worst forms of this."

=== Sub-Saharan Africa ===
In many societies of Sub-Saharan Africa, the fear of witches drives periodic witch-hunts during which specialist witch-finders identify suspects, with death by lynching often the result. Countries particularly affected by this phenomenon include South Africa, Cameroon, the Democratic Republic of the Congo, the Gambia, Ghana, Kenya, Sierra Leone, Tanzania, and Zambia.

Witch-hunts against children were reported by the BBC in 1999 in the Congo and in Tanzania, where the government responded to attacks on women accused of being witches for having red eyes. A lawsuit was launched in 2001 in Ghana, where witch-hunts are also common, by a woman accused of being a witch. Witch-hunts in Africa are often led by relatives seeking the property of the accused victim.

Audrey I. Richards, in the journal Africa, relates in 1935 an instance when a new wave of witchfinders, the Bamucapi, appeared in the villages of the Bemba people of Zambia. They dressed in European clothing, and would summon the headman to prepare a ritual meal for the village. When the villagers arrived they would view them all in a mirror, and claimed they could identify witches with this method. These witches would then have to "yield up his horns"; i.e. give over the horn containers for curses and evil potions to the witch-finders. The bamucapi then made all drink a potion called kucapa which would cause a witch to die and swell up if he ever tried such things again.

The villagers related that the witch-finders were always right because the witches they found were always the people whom the village had feared all along. The bamucapi utilised a mixture of Christian and native religious traditions to account for their powers and said that God (not specifying which God) helped them to prepare their medicine. In addition, all witches who did not attend the meal to be identified would be called to account later on by their master, who had risen from the dead, and who would force the witches by means of drums to go to the graveyard, where they would die. Richards noted that the bamucapi created the sense of danger in the villages by rounding up all the horns in the village, whether they were used for anti-witchcraft charms, potions, snuff or were indeed receptacles of black magic.

The Bemba people believed misfortunes such as wartings, hauntings and famines to be just actions sanctioned by the High-God Lesa. The only agency which caused unjust harm was a witch, who had enormous powers and was hard to detect. After white rule of Africa, beliefs in sorcery and witchcraft grew, possibly because of the social strain caused by new ideas, customs and laws, and also because the courts no longer allowed witches to be tried.

Amongst the Bantu tribes of Southern Africa, the witch smellers were responsible for detecting witches. In parts of Southern Africa, several hundred people have been killed in witch-hunts since 1990.

Cameroon has re-established witchcraft-accusations in courts after its independence in 1967. (Note: Levack, Brian P. (26 August 2004). 401–422 Section 251 of the Cameroonian penal code. Routledge. ISBN 9780815336709. (introduced 1967). Two other provisions of the penal code [translation] "state that witchcraft may be an aggravating factor for dishonest acts" (Afrik.com 26 August 2004). A person convicted of witchcraft may face a prison term of 2 to 10 years and a fine. Whereas witchcraft cases in the colonial era, especially in former British Central Africa, were based on the official dogma that witchcraft is an illusion (so that people invoking witchcraft would be punished as either impostors or slanderers), in contemporary legal practice in Africa witchcraft appears as a reality and as an actionable offence in its own right.)

It was reported on 21 May 2008 that in Kenya a mob had burnt to death at least 11 people accused of witchcraft.

In March 2009, Amnesty International reported that up to 1,000 people in the Gambia had been abducted by government-sponsored "witch doctors" on charges of witchcraft, and taken to detention centers where they were forced to drink poisonous concoctions. On 21 May 2009, The New York Times reported that the alleged witch-hunting campaign had been sparked by the Gambian President, Yahya Jammeh.

In Sierra Leone, the witch-hunt is an occasion for a sermon by the kɛmamɔi (native Mende witch-finder) on social ethics : "Witchcraft ... takes hold in people's lives when people are less than fully open-hearted. All wickedness is ultimately because people hate each other or are jealous or suspicious or afraid. These emotions and motivations cause people to act antisocially". The response by the populace to the kɛmamɔi is that "they valued his work and would learn the lessons he came to teach them, about social responsibility and cooperation."

== Use of the term in other contexts ==
The term 'witch-hunt' can be used in contexts other than witchcraft, to describe an irrational search for alleged offenders who then become the victims of the witch-hunt. Examples include Stalinist witch-hunts and McCarthyite witch-hunts. Researcher James Morone wrote that "What makes a witch hunt is not the witches (or the communists or the child molesters). Rather, it is the hunters' willingness to toss aside the normal rules of justice."

In politics, the term may be used to suggest that a person or group is being oppressed or ostracised. The Telegraph has compared cancel culture to "modern-day witch trials". 45th and current U.S. President Donald Trump frequently used the term on Twitter, referring to various investigations and the impeachment proceedings against him as witch-hunts. During his presidency he used the phrase over 330 times. The National Rifle Association of America used the term in an unsuccessful bid to dismiss the New York attorney general's lawsuit against the organization for alleged fraud.

== List of witch trials ==
- Aberdeen witch trials of 1596–1597
- Akershus witch trials
- Amersfoort and Utrecht witch trials
- Baden-Baden witch trials
- Bamberg witch trials
- Basque witch trials
- Bideford witch trial
- Bo'ness witches
- Bredevoort witch trials
- Bury St Edmunds witch trials
- Channel Islands Witch Trials
- Connecticut witch trials
- Copenhagen witch trials
- Derenburg witch trials
- Doruchów witch trial
- Eichstätt witch trials
- Ellwangen witch trial
- Esslingen witch trials
- Fulda witch trials
- Fürsteneck witch trial
- Geneva witch trials
- Great Scottish Witch Hunt of 1597
- Great Scottish witch hunt of 1649–50
- Great Scottish Witch Hunt of 1661–62
- Islandmagee witch trial
- Kasina Wielka witch trial
- Kastelholm witch trials
- Katarina witch trials
- Kirkjuból witch trial
- Liechtenstein witch trials
- Lisbon witch trial
- Lukh witch trials
- Mergentheim witch trials
- Mirandola witch trials
- Mora witch trial
- Newcastle witch trials
- Nogaredo witch trial
- North Berwick witch trials
- Northamptonshire witch trials
- Northern Moravia witch trials
- Orkney witch trials
- Paisley witches
- Pappenheimer witch trial
- Peelland witch trials
- Pittenweem witches
- Pendle witches
- Põlula witch trials
- Ramsele witch trial
- Roermond witch trial
- Rosborg witch trials
- Rottenburg witch trials
- Rottweil Witch Trials
- Rugård witch trials
- Salem witch trials
- Spa witch trial
- St Osyth Witches
- Szeged witch trials
- Terrassa witch trials
- Thisted witch trial
- Torsåker witch trials
- Trier witch trials
- Valais witch trials
- Val Camonica witch trials
- Vardø witch trials (1621)
- Vardø witch trials (1651–1653)
- Vardø witch trials (1662–1663) as part of the Christianization of the Sámi people
- Wiesensteig witch trial
- Witches of Warboys
- Würzburg witch trials

== See also ==
- Ecclesiastical court – Court having jurisdiction in Christian religious matters
- Femicide – Murder of women or girls because of their gender
- Gendercide – Systematic killing of members of a specific gender
- Feminist interpretations of the Early Modern witch trials
- European witchcraft – Belief in witchcraft in Europe
- Execution by burning – Execution, murder, or suicide method
- Christianity and paganism
- Christian views on magic
- Conspiracy theory – Attributing events to an improbable conspiracy
- Divine retribution – Supernatural punishment by a deity
- Magic and religion
- Moral panic – Fear that some evil threatens society
- Satanic panic – Widespread moral panic alleging abuse
- Scapegoating – Practice of singling out any party for undeserved negative treatment or blame
- Trial by ordeal – Medieval judicial practice to determine guilt through a life-threatening experience
- Medical explanations of bewitchment – Reported symptom of bewitchment
- Auto-da-fé – Public penance imposed during the Inquisition
- Donas de fuera – Figures in Sicilian folklore
- Marie-Josephte Corriveau – Woman from New France who murdered her second husband (1733–1763)
- Pierre de Lancre – French judge and witchhunter (1553–1631)
- "The Monsters Are Due on Maple Street"
- West Memphis Three – Men convicted of 1993 murders in Arkansas, United States
- Witch trials in the early modern period – Prosecutions for witchcraft in Europe
- Salem witch trials – Legal proceedings in Massachusetts (1692–93)
- Modern witch-hunts
- Witch-hunts in Nepal
- Women and religion – Women's roles and history surrounding religion
- Women in Christianity
- The Dark Pictures Anthology: Little Hope – 2020 video game
- Kiki's Delivery Service – 1989 Japanese animated film
- Laws against witchcraft
