= Witch trials in Portugal =

The Witch trials in Portugal were perhaps the fewest in all of Europe. Similar to the Spanish Inquisition in neighboring Spain, the Portuguese Inquisition preferred to focus on the persecution of heresy and did not consider witchcraft to be a priority. In contrast to the Spanish Inquisition, however, the Portuguese Inquisition was much more efficient in preventing secular courts from conducting witch trials, and therefore almost managed to keep Portugal free from witch trials. Only seven people are known to have been executed for sorcery in Portugal.

== History ==
Witchcraft as such was defined as a sin in 16th-century Portugal. However, the Portuguese Inquisition considered the persecution of Jews (Conversos) to be their main priority and showed scant interest in sorcery. Almost all those executed by the Portuguese Inquisition were Conversos, and those arrested for smaller 'heretical crimes' (among them sorcery) were normally given a mild sentences such as penance, fines and exile from their congregations. Due to high maternal and infant mortality rates in the sixteenth century, recognized midwives (parteira) were especially susceptible to charges of witchcraft, as the death of a mother or newborn would be followed by an accusation of witchcraft.

The biggest witch trial in Portugal was the Lisbon witch trial of 1559, ending in five executions. This resulted in an investigation which ended in another execution in Coimbra 1560. These witch trials were conducted by secular courts. After this event, all witchcraft trials were explicitly placed under the jurisdiction of the Portuguese Inquisition. This almost caused the end of witchcraft persecutions in Portugal because of the low priority of the Inquisition, who preferred to persecute the Conversos instead. No person accused of witchcraft was executed by the Holy Office in Portugal after 1626.

Between 1626 and 1744, the Portuguese Inquisition prosecuted 818 people for sorcery, four of whom were given death sentences but only one famously carried out: in Évora in 1626, when Luís de la Penha was executed. These seven executions are the only witchcraft executions known in Portugal. Most of the cases placed before the Inquisition were against cunning men (saludadores) and female fortune tellers. After 1760, the Portuguese Inquisition, discontented about the time spent on these cases and wishing to give their efforts to the persecution of heresy instead, stated that they regarded witchcraft as imagination and would not be accepting further cases of that sort.

Some people were convicted for witchcraft but was given lesser punishments than execution: Pedro Goncalves de Abreu in 1653, Bartolomeu Martins in 1683, Francisco Luis in 1690 and Manuel Inacio in 1706 were all sentenced to public whipping, life in prison, penitential habit and sequestration of property, and Cristovao Silva Marreios in 1785 and António José in 1802 sentenced to be galley slaves for six and five years respectively.

=== During the Enlightenment Era (1690–1780) ===
The majority of Inquisition cases in Portugal against magic healers occurred after the year 1680. During this time the concept of rationalism was growing and the panic surrounding witchcraft had all but passed in Europe. In Portugal, however, the end of the seventeenth century saw a dramatic increase in witchcraft trials, with its peak occurring between 1715 and 1760. Victims of these trials were overwhelmingly peasant men and women who earned their living by providing magical remedies for common illnesses within their community. These people were known as cunning women or folk healers–not witches (bruxa). Portuguese folk magic was deeply ingrained into the fabric of peasant society, spanning centuries of tradition; the majority of such being simple sorcery–magical healing, with a minority practicing malicious spells–maleficium.

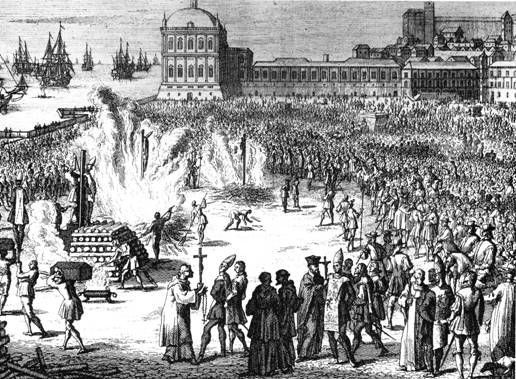
Representation of the Autos de Fé (the burning of a heretic) of the Portuguese Inquisition in Terreiro do Paço, Lisbon

In contrast to the earlier European witch hunts fueled by Inquisition superstition, in the late seventeenth and eighteenth centuries, it was the growing intellectual movement in Portugal that triggered the backlash against magical healers who continued to treat the lower classes with unscientific healing methods. Portugal’s approach to magical criminals was a rational one, favoring propaganda that discredited folk healers over witch hunts and executions. Because of this it was common for physicians and surgeons to give testimony against the accused, and the majority of accusations were connected to minor spells from urban witches. In 1690, the General Council of the Inquisition penned a policy statement against superstitious folk healers and their practices, describing popular healing activities as evil and diabolical, and scientific medicine as the divine power of God.

=== Portuguese colonies ===
While the Portuguese Inquisition kept the witch trials in Portugal proper down to a minimum, the situation was not the same in the Portuguese colonies, where witchcraft executions occurred long after they had stopped in Portugal. Several high profile witch trials which resulted in death sentences occurred in Portuguese Brazil. These trials took place in Brazil the entire 18th-century, including the case of Ursulina de Jesus in 1754, and Maria da Conceição (d. 1798).

== See also ==
- Witch trials in the early modern period
