= Witch trials in Russia =

The witch trials in Orthodox Russia were different in character than the witch trials in Roman Catholic and Protestant Europe due to the differing cultural and religious background. It is often treated as an exception to modern theories of witch-hunts, due to the perceived difference in scale, the gender distribution of those accused, and the lack of focus on the demonology of a witch who made a pact with Satan and attended a Witches' Sabbath, but only on the practice of magic as such.

== Witchcraft ==
In Russia, magicians were called vedun (wizard, rus "ведун") or ved'ma (witch, rus "ведьма"), and sorcery was known as koldovstvo or charodeivstvo. Sorcery or witchcraft was defined similarly as in Europe and defined as weather magic, fortune telling, dream interpretation, herbal medicine and chants, but the form of magic which was normally the focus of witch trials were magic which had been used to cause harm and were referred to as porcha, a Russian equivalent of the European concept of maleficium.

There was a belief that some people had the ability to use the mystic powers of nature to perform magic, which could be used for both good and evil purposes, but there was little connection made between sorcery and the Devil. Similar to the churches of Europe, the Russian Orthodox church strongly condemned sorcery and wished to exterminate it, but the motivation differed. The Russian Orthodox church viewed sorcery as a form of Paganism and viewed the eradication of it as a form of Christianization against traces of pre-Christian religion, and not as persecutions of people who had made a pact with Satan, and there was no or weak belief in witches who made a pact with the Devil and attended a Witches' Sabbath, only in people - men and women - who caused harm by use of Pagan magic, who must be eradicated for the sake of their fellow citizens.

However, that the majority of witch trials did not concern demonic magic did not mean cases of demonic magic was nonexistent. It used to be believed that demonic magic was unknown in Russia, however this theory has been since challenged. It was certainly present, albeit of less importance. During the Lukh trial, one local governor reported the accusation of a man with a cross under his heel who was said to have used satanic rituals to cast spells.

== Legal situation ==
In the church council of 1551, the Russian Orthodox church asked Czar Ivan the Terrible to persecute Paganism and introduce the death penalty for pagans such as the sorcerers, astrologers and fortune tellers, and allow for the church to banish them and the secular courts to execute them. Ivan the Terrible did not introduce the death penalty for sorcery, but he banned the use of magic and authorized secular courts to prosecute it as a crime. In a Decree of 1648, the Tsar Alexis of Russia introduced the death penalty for all form of Paganism such as sorcery, and a new Decree in 1653 specified that the penalty was to be death by burning.

== Occurrence ==
In 1906 Russian scholar Nikolai Iakovlevich Novombergski published a collection of 17th-century protocols from the Moscow witchcraft trials, which to this day is the most comprehensive source of knowledge about Russian witchcraft. Due to little other documentation the true scale of Russian witch trials is not known. Some scholars speak of 99 cases between 1622 and 1700, others of 136. There is no complete number of those accused of sorcery in Russia, not all cases were referred by the local courts to the central court. The majority of cases were small trials with only one accused sorcerer, but there were bigger trials, such as three with over one hundred witnesses.

=== Gender ===
While the percentage of accused female witches exceeded 75% in most regions of Europe, Russia in this respect, along with Scandinavian countries, is a clear exception: in the years 1622–1700 68% of those accused were men. One theory suggests that the reason for the predominance of men among the accused relates to the specific nature of the legal system in Russia and claims that a new legal definition of magic introduced in 1716 in the military code was a crucial factor. After the legislation the number of accusations of witchcraft increased significantly amongst soldiers and government officials. Before that, anti-witch laws had the primary function of protecting the Tsar and the main categories of accused were clergymen – usually minor rural clergy or people associated with them – and members of the court or tsarist administration. Magic was practiced by both genders at all levels of society from the earliest historical times, and the statistical advantage of convicted men was due to conflicts in male-dominated areas. When women were accused, they were related to the same categories; they were often wives of soldiers or clergymen or were in some way connected with the court or important figures of the state. According to this theory, witch-hunts in Russia can be interpreted as a political rather than a religious phenomenon.

== The end ==
Tsar Peter the Great kept the death penalty for sorcery in the law of 1716. In 1731, empress Anna of Russia legally redefined sorcery as a form of fraud, but did not remove the death penalty as the punishment for this type of fraud. Empress Catherine the Great made it clear after her accession to the throne that the death penalty should no longer be used against people convicted of the fraud of sorcery, and from 1775 formally transferred the crime to be handled only by a so-called trial of conscience, sovestnye sudy, which dealt with insignificant crimes such as superstition.

== See also ==
- Witch trials in the early modern period
- Lukh witch trials
- Andrei Bezobrazov
