= Esslingen witch trials =

- Part of Witch trials in the Holy Roman Empire
- The Old Town Hall in Esslingen.
- Date: 1662–1666
- Location: Esslingen and district
- Cause: Moral panic, economic precarity
- Organized by: Daniel Hauff (prosecutor), Esslingen City Council
- Deaths: 37
- Arrests: 79
- Accused: 200+
- Charges: Witchcraft and associated crimes

The Esslingen witch trials were a series of witch trials that occurred in Esslingen, Germany, between 1662 and 1666, resulting in the deaths of 37 victims.

It was the first mass witch trial to occur in Württemberg, a state previously known for judicial restraint regarding alleged sorcery, and one of the final two mass witch trials in the area constituting modern Germany.

== Context ==
At the time of the trials, Esslingen was a free imperial city, a semi-autonomous city within the Holy Roman Empire; it was also a Lutheran stronghold. Esslingen's proximity to the University of Tübingen, and its influential sceptical academics, tempered the moral panic around witchcraft observed in other parts of Germany.

The city had executed just five people as witches since Europe's witch trials began in 1541. Notably, after hail damage killed the crops of local farmers in 1562, three people were tried for witchcraft, of whom one was ultimately executed. The populace had been primed to blame unfavourable weather events on sorcery by the district's superintendent, Thomas Naogeorgus, whose sermons against alleged witches were so extreme that Esslingen's government fired him that year.

Although Esslingen did not persecute witches on the basis of weather events at this time, authorities in nearby Wiesensteig took up the mantle. The resultant Wiesensteig witch trials led to the deaths of over 60 women by 1563.

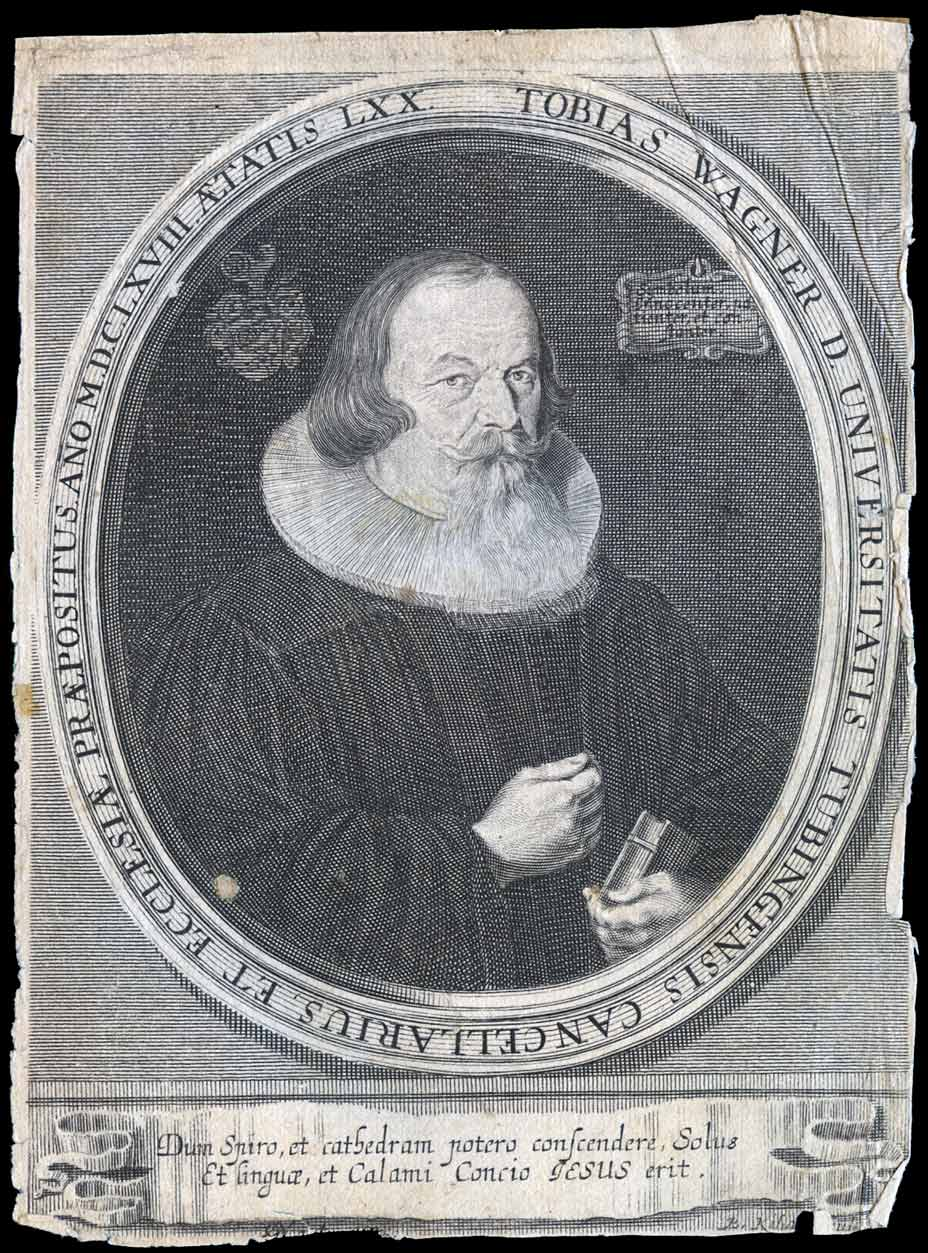
Tobias Wagner, by artist Bartholomäus Kilian (1630–1674).

=== Resurgence in persecution of witches ===
Esslingen's population and wealth declined during the Thirty Years' War, waged between 1618 and 1648. The city had also suffered from an outbreak of bubonic plague in the mid-1630s, when Esslingen's population stood at between 5,000 and 10,000. Over 2,500 people died over the years of 1634 and 1635.

When the fresh spate of witch trials commenced in 1662, Esslingen was amidst a period of rapid population recovery. The city had also lost the moderate voice of Tobias Wagner, an influential local preacher who advocated for forgiving accused witches and rehabilitating them through religion. He left Esslingen in 1653 to become a professor of theology at the University of Tübingen.

Esslingen, and other cities that had avoided the hysteria seen in other parts of Germany, began prosecuting alleged witches in the mid-17th century. Historian Lyndal Roper attributes the shift in policy to collective anxiety over diminishing resources and population growth. Similarly, Wolfgang Behringer notes that preachers had continued the tradition of Thomas Naogeorgus, by linking poor crop yields to possible sorcery. John Demos further suggests that the war had splintered the community, leading to local infighting.

Other academics, including William E. Burns, highlight that the Esslingen prosecutions began when fanatical jurist Daniel Hauff was appointed as Esslingen's inquisitor. The trials effectively ended with his death.

== Initial allegations ==
In early 1662, a 10-year-old boy from the village of Vaihingen, near Esslingen, voluntarily confessed to practising witchcraft. He also accused other youths including a 16-year-old boy who, in turn, denounced 17 other people. Among the more serious claims made by some of these youths was that they had killed local infants simply by touching them with one finger. To pacify the concerned local population, Esslingen's council appointed jurist Daniel Hauff to explore the allegations.

Hauff received broad authority to investigate, torture, and punish suspected witches. He was supported by a Geheimrat, a subcommittee established by Esslingen's city government that consisted of three mayors and two councillors. The powers afforded to Hauff expedited his career and standing within local government. Though likely motivated by power, Hauff was also a religious zealot who possessed an unusually detailed knowledge of demonology.

== Trials ==
=== First wave: 1662 ===
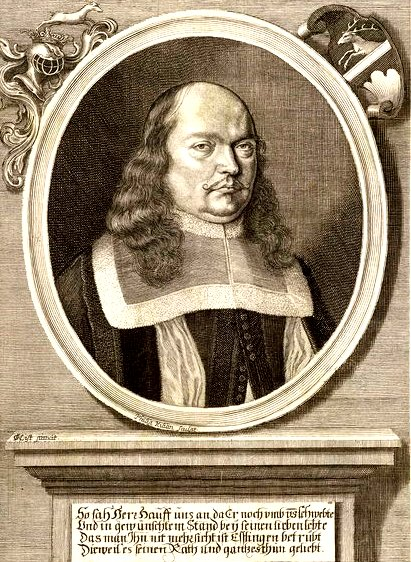
Portrait of Daniel Hauff by Georg List (fl. 1653–1672)

Under Hauff's authority, the teenager who had denounced 17 others was quickly executed, as were several of the people he accused. Many of the confessions Hauff elicited through torture involved accounts of bestiality or homosexuality. Historians including William E. Burns have characterized Hauff's preoccupation with these topics, particularly when prosecuting teenage boys, as evidence of a puritanical obsession. As described by researcher Robert Walinski-Kiehl, Hauff was a "moral entrepreneur" who demonstrated an "excessive" interest in the sexual elements of the alleged crimes.

Indeed, Esslingen's officials were soon unnerved by how often Hauff's trials resulted in executions. To quell municipal opposition, Hauff and local magistrates contacted the Tübingen University Faculty of Law for a legal opinion on the appropriateness of execution as a sentence for witchcraft. Tübingen's scholars concluded that at least one of Esslingen's self-confessed witches was merely suffering from delusions, and they also rebuked Esslingen for torturing suspects.

Hauff instead sought an opinion from jurists at the University of Strasbourg, as he correctly predicted that its jurists would encourage the use of death sentences. In 1631, Strasbourg scholars had issued a questionable interpretation of the Constitutio Criminalis Carolina that allowed alleged witches to be executed even if they were not thought to have caused any meaningful harm. Since then, the faculty had retained its reputation for supporting action against perceived witch activity, under the Lutheran orthodox direction of deacon Johann Rebhan.

By the end of 1662, 56 people had been identified as suspected witches, of whom around 28 were executed. Most of the accused were from villages surrounding Esslingen that fell under its authority, including Vaihingen and Möhringen. Residents of these areas were typically less affluent and educated than Esslingen's populace. Many of the accused were troubled men with poor reputations. One suspect, blacksmith Georg Laumayer, was an alcoholic; weaver Hans Zwench was addicted to gambling.

=== Later trials and Hauff's death: 1663–1666 ===
Public opinion soon turned on the trials after residents of Esslingen started to face denouncement, rather than people from surrounding rural localities. Jurists at the University of Strasbourg, who were beginning to internally debate whether the judicial system was appropriate for handling witchcraft cases at all, also tempered their earlier opinions in support of Hauff's trials. They urged Esslingen's courts to rely on credible witnesses and to prove that acts of sorcery had caused material harm.

Esslingen's witch trials subsequently fell almost dormant in 1663, and just one execution was recorded in 1664. Eight people were sentenced to death in 1665, but Hauff's own sudden death at the age of 36 in October that year put an end to further executions.

Whether Hauff died of natural causes or murder by poisoning is a matter of historical debate. Historian Lyndal Roper suggests his death may have been plotted by the municipal government, from whom Hauff had effectively wrested judicial control. Suspects remaining in custody at the time of his death were either released or subjected to minor penalties.

Overall, 214 people were suspected of witchcraft in Esslingen and surrounding areas between 1662 and 1666. Of these, at least 79 were arrested and 37 were executed.

== Aftermath ==
Witch trials in nearby Reutlingen between 1665 and 1666 proved to be the final mass witch trial in present-day Germany. Reutlingen's government similarly approached the University of Strasbourg for endorsement of their trials, but its scholars issued a more cautious opinion than the analysis provided to Esslingen. They advocated for authorities to meet a greater standard of proof, and maintained this position until the witch trials in Europe ended.

== Legacy ==
=== In literature ===
The Esslingen witch trials under Hauff inspired the 2010 historical fiction novel The Children of Witches, authored by Sherri Smith.
