= Jeanne Brolliet =

Swiss woman executed for witchcraft

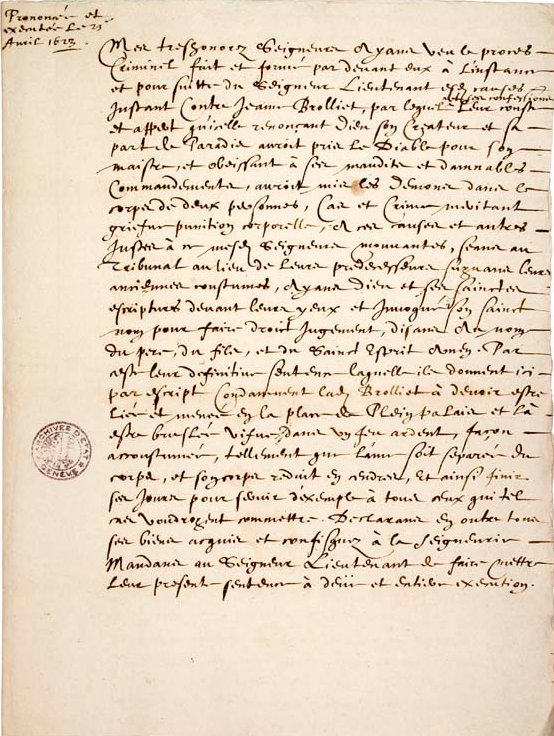
Sentence of the witch trial held in 1623 in Geneva, Switzerland

Jeanne Brolliet (died 1623) was a Genevan woman who was executed for witchcraft.

She is known as the last person to be burned at the stake for witchcraft in the city of Geneva. She was, however, not the last person to be executed for sorcery in Geneva: the last person to be executed for sorcery in Geneva was Michée Chauderon, but she was not executed by burning.
