= Geneva witch trials =

Largest witch trial in Post-Reformation Geneva

The Geneva witch trials of 1571 was the biggest witch trial in the Post-Reformation Geneva in present-day Switzerland, as well as the last big one.

In 1567, Geneva was struck by a plague that lasted for four years. In 1571, frustration over the persistent epidemic caused a witchcraft persecution caused by rumours that the uncommonly long plague had been caused by witches. 29 people were executed, and an additional number of people were banished, judged guilty accused of having made a pact with the Devil, participated in a witches' sabbath and having caused the plague by use of witchcraft.

This was the biggest witch trial in Protestant Geneva. While John Calvin (1509-1564) strongly condemned witches, witch trials were uncommon in Geneva in practice. While 150 witch trials took place in Geneva between the reformation and 1681, the witch hunt peaked with this trial in 1571, and all subsequent witch trials were smaller. The last executions were those of Rolette Revilliod (1626) and Michée Chauderon (1652), but most witch trials after 1571 ended in banishments.
