= Spa witch trial =

The Spa witch trial took place in the city of Spa in present-day Belgium, in 1616. It was one of the larger and better known of the witch trials in Belgium. It led to the execution of ten women, and possibly the death of another four.

== Background ==
On 31 January 1616, the authorities of Franchimont instituted an investigation into sorcery. The reason was to find a cause for a strange plague which had caused the death of both humans and animals. The authorities encouraged the public to report anyone suspicious, such as women gathering in the forest or anyone absent from work, and condemned those giving bread to the sick, in an attempt to bewitch them, and husbands who suspected their wives of committing adultery with devils.

== The trial ==
On 3 February, Gielette Handchoule and Maroie Hérode were reported by a woman to be reputed witches. Maroie's husband, Bertholomé Hérode, said that she had once felt very cold on return after having been absent. A man reported that Isabeau delle Court and Gelette Noel were talked about as witches, and claimed that his horse had been sick after passing them. Several women were reported to the authorities in a similar way. Fourteen women were judged guilty and sentenced to death. The method of execution for witchcraft in Belgium was commonly garrotting and burning. This was a witch trial which seemed to have been staged entirely by the authorities.

== The accused of the trial ==
Fourteen women were judged guilty of witchcraft. More women were put on trial, but some of them were found not guilty.

- Gelette, wife of Henry Noel
- Marguerite, daughter of Jean delle courte
- Isabeau, widow of Jean delle Courte
- Maroie, wife of Jean André
- The daughter of Bertelme Herode married to Remacle Hanzoulle
- Jeanne Gerlaxhe
- The daughter of Bertholomé Herode, betrothed
- Donnon wife of Mathy Cockelet
- The wife of Bastin Collin
- The wife of Remacle Begoz
- The wife of Jacques Cockelet
- Senton Gerlaxhe
- Gielette wife of Henri de Wanze
- Maroie wife of Bertholomé Hérode

Of fourteen women, four possibly died in prison under torture.

== See also ==
- Tanneke Sconyncx

== Literature ==
- Pierre Den Dooven, Sorcellerie dans le ban de Spa
