= Rottenburg witch trials =

The Rottenburg witch trials were a series of witch trials taking place in Rottenburg am Neckar in then Further Austria in present day Baden-Württemberg in Germany between 1578 and 1609. It resulted in the death of 150 people. The witch trials were divided in the waves of 1578-1585, 1589-90, 1595-96, 1598-1605 and 1609. The high peak of the trials were the witch trials of 1595-96, when 41 women were burnt alive at the stake between June 1595 and July 1596. Rottenburg was known as a witch trials center and the 1595 trial attracted attention from the University of Tübingen. The Rottenburg witch trials has been characterized as traditional, since the victims were almost exclusively poor old women, and never developed in to the endemic mass trials in which citizens of all sexes and classes could be indiscriminately accused, such as the Würzburg witch trials, and they were conducted under strict control from the authorities.

== 1578-1589 ==
Rottenburg became Protestant during the Reformation, but reverted to Catholicism during the Counter-Reformation. The first execution for witchcraft is registered in 1578. From that point onward, witch trials became unusually common in Rottenburg and Horb: nine people were executed in 1580, eight in 1582, twelve in Rottenburg and 13 in Horb in 1583, and nine in 1585, when the authorities ended the trials with the statement that if the persecutions continued, all women in Rottenburg would eventually die. They were allowed to continue in 1589, with five executions.

== 1590-1594 ==
Between 1590 and 1594, a famous case took place when the noblewoman Agatha von Sontheim zu Nellingsheim was cleared of all charges in exchange for paying a price of 10.000 gulden as well as the promise that the population living on her estates would convert to Catholicism.

== 1595-1596 ==
In June 1595, at least six women were tortured to confess that because of their unhappiness, poverty and marital problems, they had committed adultery with the Devil and caused harm on the harvest and cattle of the region by use of witchcraft. They were tortured to point out accomplices, and executed. Between 7 May and 21 July 1596, one more woman died of torture, and 35 women were burned alive chained to stakes. This witch trial attracted a lot of contemporary attention, and it is noted that the professors of the University of Tübingen were forced to accept the absence of their students, who went to watch the witch burnings in Rottenburg. This trial is better-documented that those of the 1580s. With one exception, all of the accused were poor, many of them old, women, whose sexual and religious life were not conforming to the expected norms: while it is not clear that if they were Protestants, the interrogations to reveal that they were at least non-conforming Catholics.

== 1598-1609 ==
In 1598, the persecutions continued with one executions, followed by ten in 1599, seventeen in 1600 and fifteen in 1601. In 1602, the official Hans Georg Hallmayer, who had managed many witch trials, were himself arrested and died from torture in prison, followed by six executions in 1603, six in 1605 and four in 1609.

== End and evaluation ==
In 1613, Jakob Hallritter of the University of Tübingen proved that the allegations against a group of women then held in prison were not legally proven, a principle which prevented further witch trials in Rottenburg. The Rottenburg witch trials were notable for continuing almost without pause for almost four decades. The reason to why they were able to continue for so long has been attributed to its character.

The trials at Trier, Würzburg and Bamberg were also big mass trials, but were ended by the authorities when they became indiscriminate and anyone -- regardless of class or sex -- could be arrested, and thus became a threat to the authorities themselves. In contrast, the victims of the Rottenburg witch trials were almost all poor women: the trials generally did not expand beyond that category, and were therefore not considered threatening by the authorities, who practiced and maintained a tight control over the proceedings, and saw no reason to stop them.
