= Lisbon witch trial =

Witch trial in Portugal, 1559–1560

The Lisbon witch trial took place in 1559-1560 and resulted in the execution of six women for witchcraft. The trial in Lisbon resulted in a general inquiry of witchcraft in Portugal, which resulted in 27 additional people being accused, and one more receiving a death sentence the following year. This was arguably the only witch trial with multiple death sentences that ever took place in Portugal.

== The trial ==
The witch trial in Lisbon of 1559 was conducted by the secular authorities. Five women were accused of witchcraft in the city of Lisbon. In the trial records, the accused confessed to sexual intercourse with the Devil and claimed that it was more pleasurable than sex with mortal men. One of them confessed to killing 200 babies. The confessions also claimed that the Devil and his demons visited them in prison and punished them with abuse in their cells as punishment for their confessions. The five women judged guilty were executed by burning.

The witch trial caused some unrest, which resulted in Queen Catarina ordering a general inquiry into witchcraft in Portugal. The inquiry resulted in the arrest of 27 people for suspected witchcraft. Of the 27 accused, one was sentenced to death. The remainder of those judged guilty were sentenced to other punishments, such as prison, banishment and whipping.

There are no other cases resembling the Lisbon witch trial in Portugal. The Portuguese Inquisition generally showed a lack of enthusiasm in executing people for witchcraft: only four people were given a death sentence from the Inquisition for witchcraft in 1626–1744. 818 people were accused of witchcraft by the Inquisition of Portugal in 1600–1774, however, and though only four were given death sentences, many did die in the prison of the Inquisition. Though the documentation of the secular courts in Portugal is scarce, the Lisbon witch trial of 1559 is regarded as unique in Portugal, where the accusation of witchcraft normally did not result in a death sentence. Reportedly, there was only one execution for witchcraft by burning confirmed to have been carried out by the Portuguese Inquisition; Luís de la Penha in Evora in 1626.
