= Amersfoort and Utrecht witch trials =

The Amersfoort and Utrecht witch trials took place in Amersfoort in The Netherlands in 1591–1595, with appeals and sentences in Utrecht. The witch trials resulted in the prosecution of seventeen people and the execution of at least six people by strangulation and burning.
