= Michée Chauderon =

Last person executed for witchcraft in Geneva

- Born: Savoyard state
- Died: 6 April 1652; Republic of Geneva
- Occupations: Laundress, domestic servant
- Known for: Being the final victim of the Genevese witch trials
- Criminal charges: Witchcraft
- Penalty: Sentenced to death

Michée Chauderon (sometimes referred to as Michelle; c. 1602 – 6 April 1652) was a domestic servant who became the final victim of the witch trials in the Republic of Geneva.

== Biography ==
Chauderon was a Savoyard emigrant who worked as a laundress for private households. She was illiterate and lived in relative poverty after the death of her husband, a silk carder. A practising Catholic, she was described after her death as "full of piety" by Jean-Robert Chouet, a conclusion he reached upon reviewing her trial records.

In 1639, Chauderon became pregnant; the father was a fellow servant who died soon after. Because she was not married at this time, she was convicted of the crime of sexual immorality.

== Trial for witchcraft ==
Chauderon was accused of witchcraft by her employers in early 1652, who alleged that she had cursed their daughters. Their accusations bore a resemblance to three of the four witch trials held in Geneva immediately preceding Chauderon's case. Investigators questioned the girls and found their testimony unconvincing, but Chauderon was arrested in March nonetheless.

Physicians checked Chauderon while in custody, identifying two marks under her breast and on her thigh. At the time, Genevese authorities customarily investigated people suspected of witchcraft for devil's marks, or physical marks on their body that supposedly evidenced a relationship with the Devil. They could not decide whether these marks were natural, so prosecutors employed two Protestant surgeons from nearby Nyon to assess Chauderon, who concluded that her blemishes were likely supernatural.

Doctors subsequently pierced Chauderon's marks with a needle, believing that doing so would only draw blood if she was innocent. Not only did Chauderon bleed, but she seemed to know very little about witchcraft or the Devil when investigators questioned her about her alleged offences. The examining physicians resolved that Chauderon was innocent, and opposed putting her to death.

Not satisfied by the doctors' conclusions, Genevese prosecutors ordered for Chauderon to undergo torture. During the abuse, Chauderon's tormentors found another mark on her thigh that allegedly caused her no pain when a needle was inserted. On 1 April 1652, Chauderon confessed to dealings with the Devil, though she maintained that she had never renounced her baptism.

Chauderon was sentenced to death by strangulation, with her body burnt afterwards. Her death marked the first execution of an alleged witch in Geneva since 1626, and would prove to be the last in the Republic of Geneva.

== Legacy ==
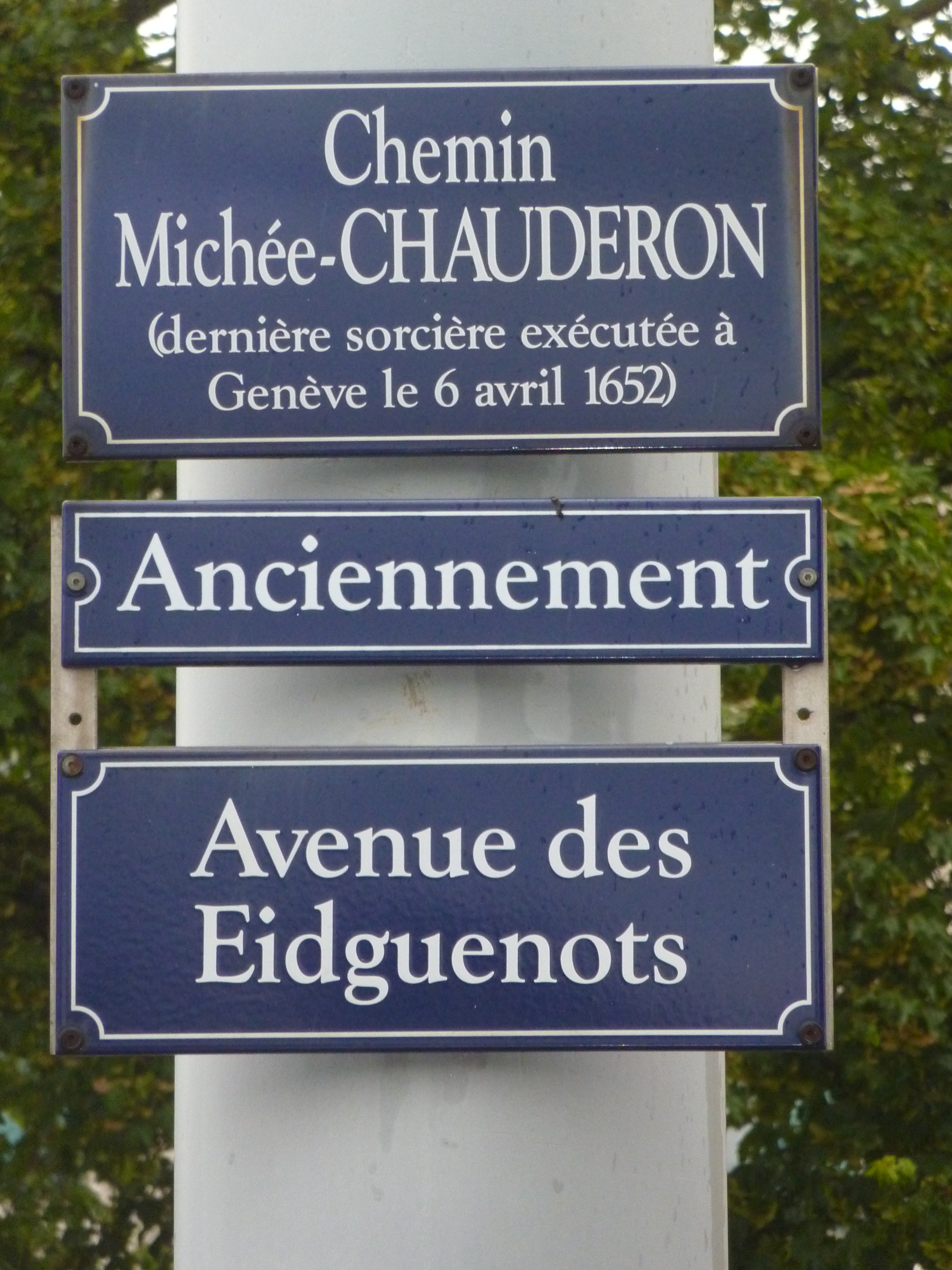
Plaque denoting Chemin Michée-Chauderon (Michée-Chauderon Path) in Geneva

=== In philosophy ===
Chauderon's case received renewed attention in 1768 when French philosopher Voltaire, who opposed Christian religious fanaticism, wrote critically about hers and other witch trials in his Dictionnaire philosophique.

=== In culture ===
In the modern era, Chauderon's life has inspired several television and radio shows, and at least one stage play. She became a symbol for Switzerland's women's liberation movement in the 1970s.

=== Landmarks ===
In 1997, Geneva named a street for Chauderon, Chemin Michée-Chauderon.
