= Newcastle witch trials =

1655 English witch trials

Newcastle upon Tyne witch trials
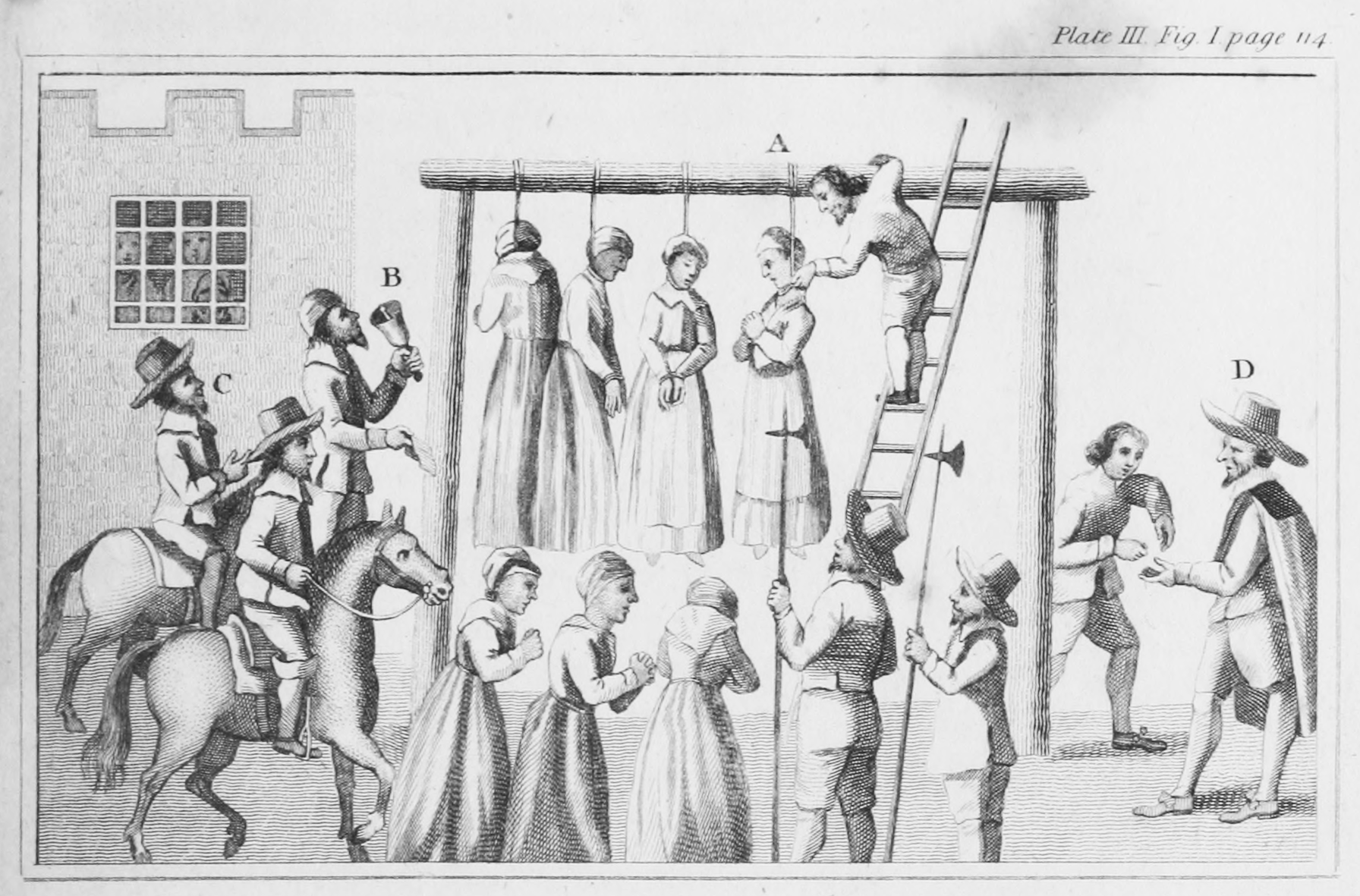
- Women being hanged for witchcraft, Newcastle upon Tyne, Ralph Gardiner, 1655
- Date: 1655
- Location: Newcastle upon Tyne
- Charges: Witchcraft
- Sentence: Hanging

In Newcastle upon Tyne, witch trials were conducted in the 17th century, during an era of social and religious turmoil. Many people were accused of being witches, tried and executed.

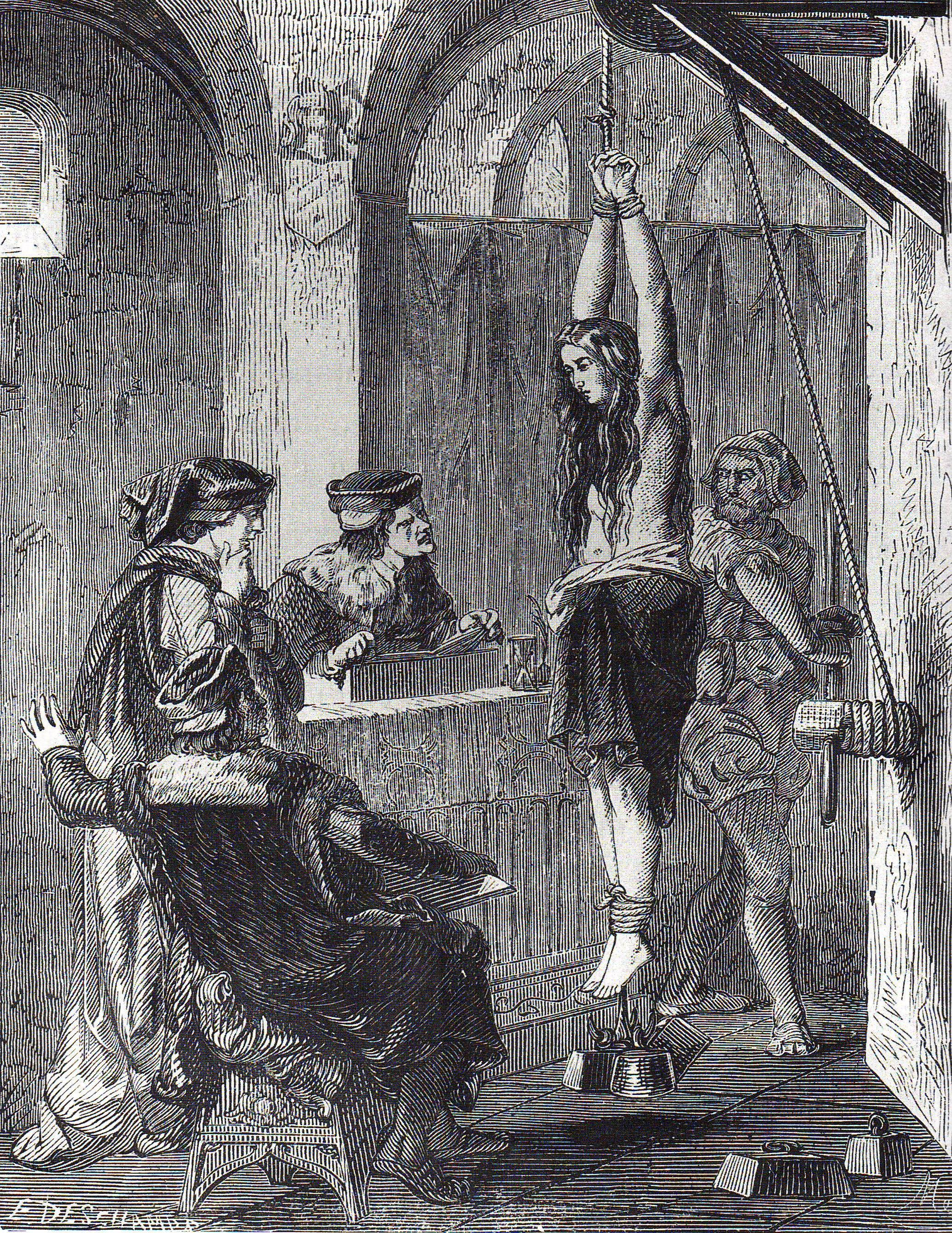
Woman accused of witchcraft in the Middle Ages - Author: Émile Deschamps, 2008

== History ==
=== Background ===
The history of the Newcastle witch trials starts in Scotland. The extension of the Witchcraft Act in 1649 sparked an intense witch hunting period. This spilled into the north of England and in Newcastle. 1649 saw Puritan Magistrates at Newcastle send two sergeants, Thomas Shevel and Cuthbert Nicholson, to Scotland to bring an unnamed Scottish witch-finder to try witches in Newcastle.

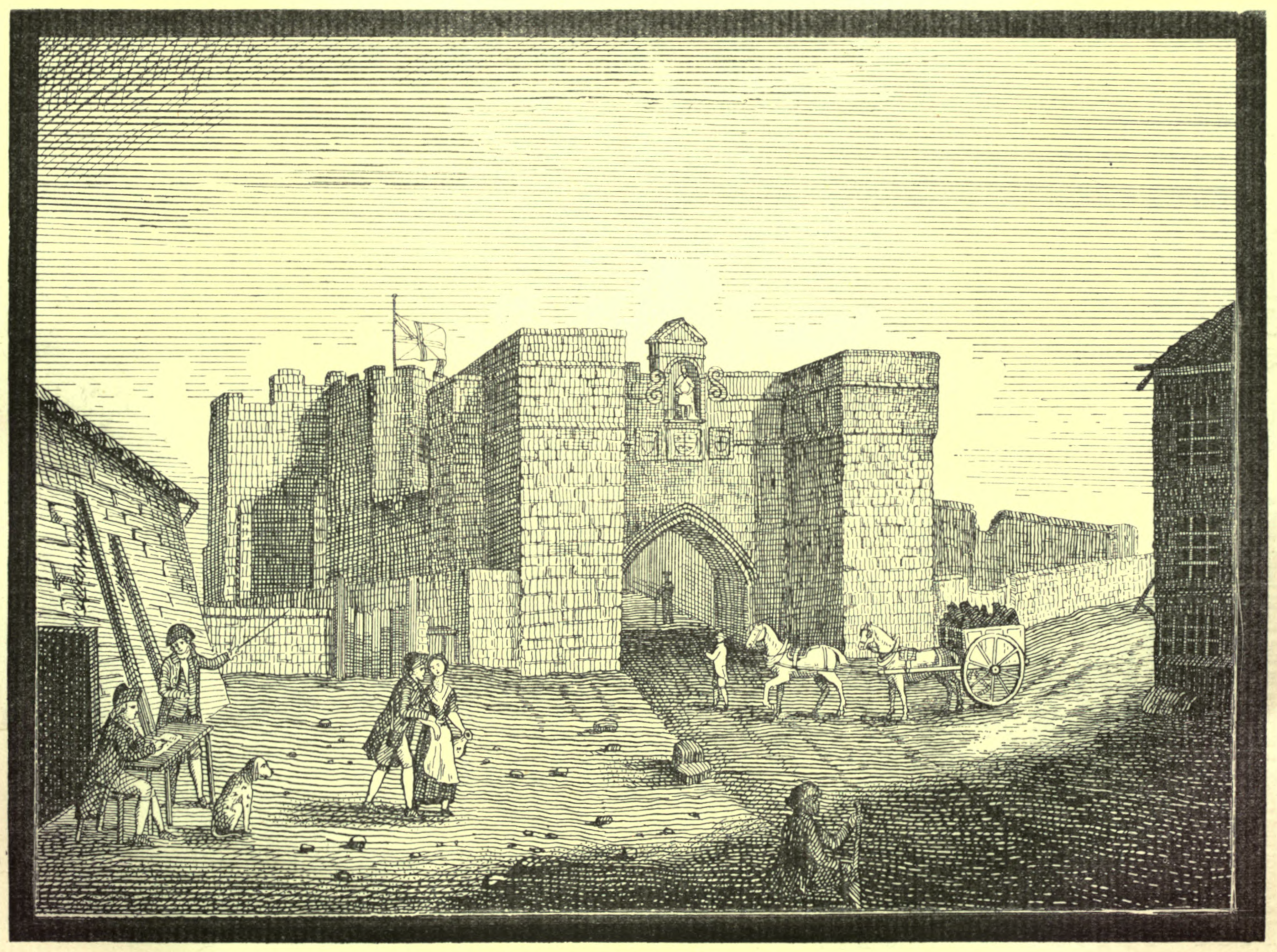
New Gate, Newcastle, England, 1789 - drawing.

A town crier sent through the town would cry "All people that would bring in any complaint against any woman for a witch." This led to 30 women being brought into the town hall. The 30 suspected witches were held in New Gate Gaol in the lead up to their trials. One witch, Jane Martin, was held in the dungeon at Newcastle Castle, as this was her native county prison in Northumberland.

=== Trials ===
A year later, in the guildhall at Newcastle's Quayside, the 31 trials of the accused took place. Following these trials, 16 were found guilty and hanged on 21 August 1650 alongside criminals convicted of other crimes. These hangings drew a large audience, as the events were treated as entertainment.

One of the convicted, Margaret Brown, asked that God give a remarkable sign that could prove her innocence. As soon as she was taken from the ladder, blood gushed from her neck onto the onlookers.

== List of accused ==
A list of names of those executed for witchcraft on Newcastle's Town Moor on 21 August 1650 was recorded in the Parish register for Newcastle St. Andrews Church.

Name	Execution	Date
Matthew Bulmer	Executed	21 August 1650
Elizabeth Anderson	Executed by hanging	21 August 1650
Jane Hunter	Executed by hanging	21 August 1650
Mary Potts	Executed by hanging	21 August 1650
Alice Hume	Executed by hanging	21 August 1650
Margaret Muffit	Executed by hanging	21 August 1650
Margaret Maddison	Executed by hanging	21 August 1650
Elizabeth Brown	Executed by hanging	21 August 1650
Margaret Brown	Executed by hanging	21 August 1650
Jane Copeland	Executed by hanging	21 August 1650
Ann Watson	Executed by hanging	21 August 1650
Elianor Henderson	Executed by hanging	21 August 1650
Elizabeth Dobson	Executed by hanging	21 August 1650
Katherine Coultor	Executed by hanging	21 August 1650
Elianor Rogerson	Executed by hanging	21 August 1650
Jane Martin	Executed by hanging	21 August 1650
Margaret White (sister of Jane Martin)	Confessed on behalf of her sister, thus was also hung	21 August 1650
Dorothy Swinhoe	Unknown whether executed	
Ann Menin	Unknown whether executed	

== The Witchfinder ==
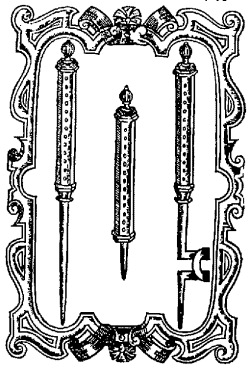
Engraving of needles with a retractable point or false shaft used by 16th century magicians to trick audiences into thinking they had stabbed themselves. Originally published in The Discoverie of Witchcraft (1584) by Reginald Scot.

=== Introduction ===
Witchfinders were people who were paid to test whether someone was a witch.

The witchfinder in Newcastle witch trials came from Scotland. He was paid 20 shillings per "witch" he found.

In the end, the witchfinder in Newcastle trials was cast into prison.

=== Action and role ===
The witchfinder used a pin to prick the accused on their thigh. If no blood came out, the accused was determined to be a witch.

=== Experience of the event ===
In July 1649, the Puritan Magistrates at Newcastle commissioned a witchfinder to find witches. Thirty women were accused as witches. As a result, all were arrested and jailed awaiting trial.

== Motivations and accusations ==
The Newcastle witch trials emerged as a result of political unrest, religious reform and personal disputes, and these became motivations for hunting and persecuting those believed to be witches.

=== Religion ===
Because of witches' supposed association with the devil, religion was influential in the city's decision to hold witch trials. This belief was built on during the trials.

=== Influence of the Civil War ===
The English Civil War (1642–1651) created a political unrest in the UK between Parliamentarians and Catholics. Charles struggled before parliament before starting a "tyrannical" eleven years of rule in which parliament was not assembled. King Charles I was imprisoned in Newcastle upon Tyne from 1646 to 1647, at the time of Jane Martin's accusations.

=== Jane Martin ===
Jane Martin and her sister Margaret White were among the accused women. Jane Martin was accused of witchcraft for being servant to the devil for five years. It was claimed the devil and her would eat together. Jane Martin was accused of being responsible for the death of a man (Thomas Young) by manipulating a kiln of oats to explode using the will of her mind. Margaret confessed on behalf of the sisters and both Margaret White and Jane Martin were hanged in 1650 with other accused witches on Town Moor.
