= Derenburg witch trials =

Witch trails of 1 October 1555

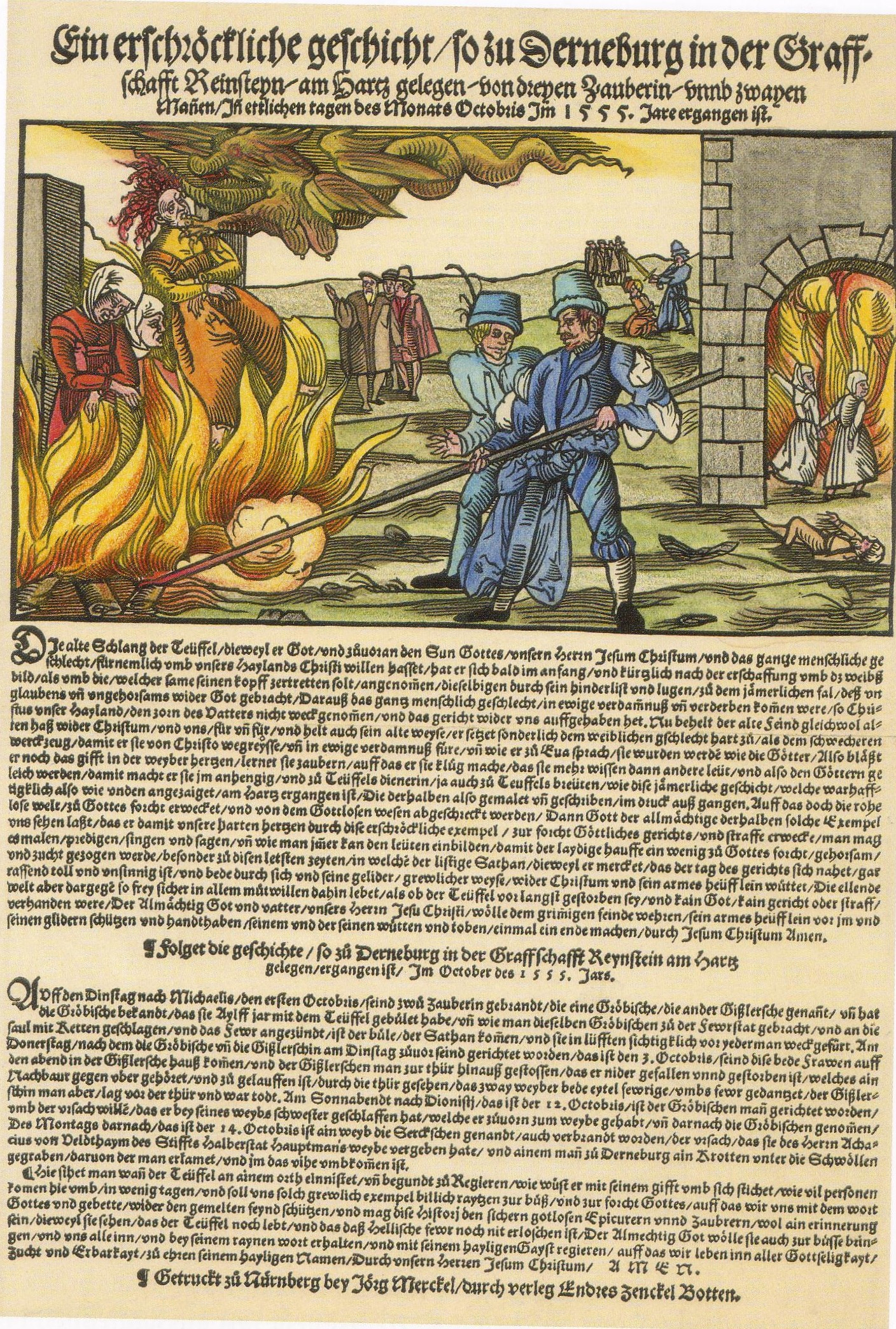
Hexenverbrennung in Derenburg am Harz; Popular print from Nürnberg, by Jörg Merckel, 1555

The Derenburg witch trials took place in the County of Regenstein in the Holy Roman Empire in present day Germany on the 1st of October 1555. They resulted in the execution of 4 people (3 women and 1 man) by being burnt at the stake. There are no official records and little documentation of the trials and burnings, but they were made famous in contemporary Germany by a well-known popular print, in which they were illustrated and described.

The print, which is a typical example of so-called 'witch newspapers' or pamphlets found in Southern Germany during the height of its witch-hunting craze, tells of two women Gröbische, and Gißlersche, who were executed by burning in October 1555 for witchcraft. Gröbische had confessed to have been in a pact with Satan for eleven years. The sensationalist popular print claimed that Gröbische was saved from the stake by her lover Satan himself, who lifted her up from the burning stake and flew away with her after it was lit. Two days later, on October 3, 1555, the two burned women are said to have returned to Derenburg and danced around the fire in Gißler's house. The print also claims they pushed Gißler's husband out the door of his house so roughly that he fell to his death in front of his neighbours.

On 12 October 1555, the widower of Gröbischen was executed for fornication and adultery with the sister of his late wife. Two days later another woman, Serckschen, was executed later in October for having made a man lame and given him fever by burying a toad beneath his doorway.

Until the 1560s, witch trials were still quite uncommon and small in Germany, and the case of Derenburg attracted great attention. The Derenburg witch trials became famous in contemporary Germany by the popular print and used as a deterrent example to others.
