= Lukh witch trials =

Lukh witch trials in 1656–1660 in the village of Lukh outside of Moscow were one of the biggest and most well known witch trials in Russia. Twenty five people, most of whom were male, were accused of having cast a spell over 45 people, causing an epidemic of fits in 33 women and two men, and impotence in ten men. Five of the accused were executed for sorcery.
