= Kasina Wielka witch trial =

1634 witch trial in the Polish-Lithuanian commonwealth

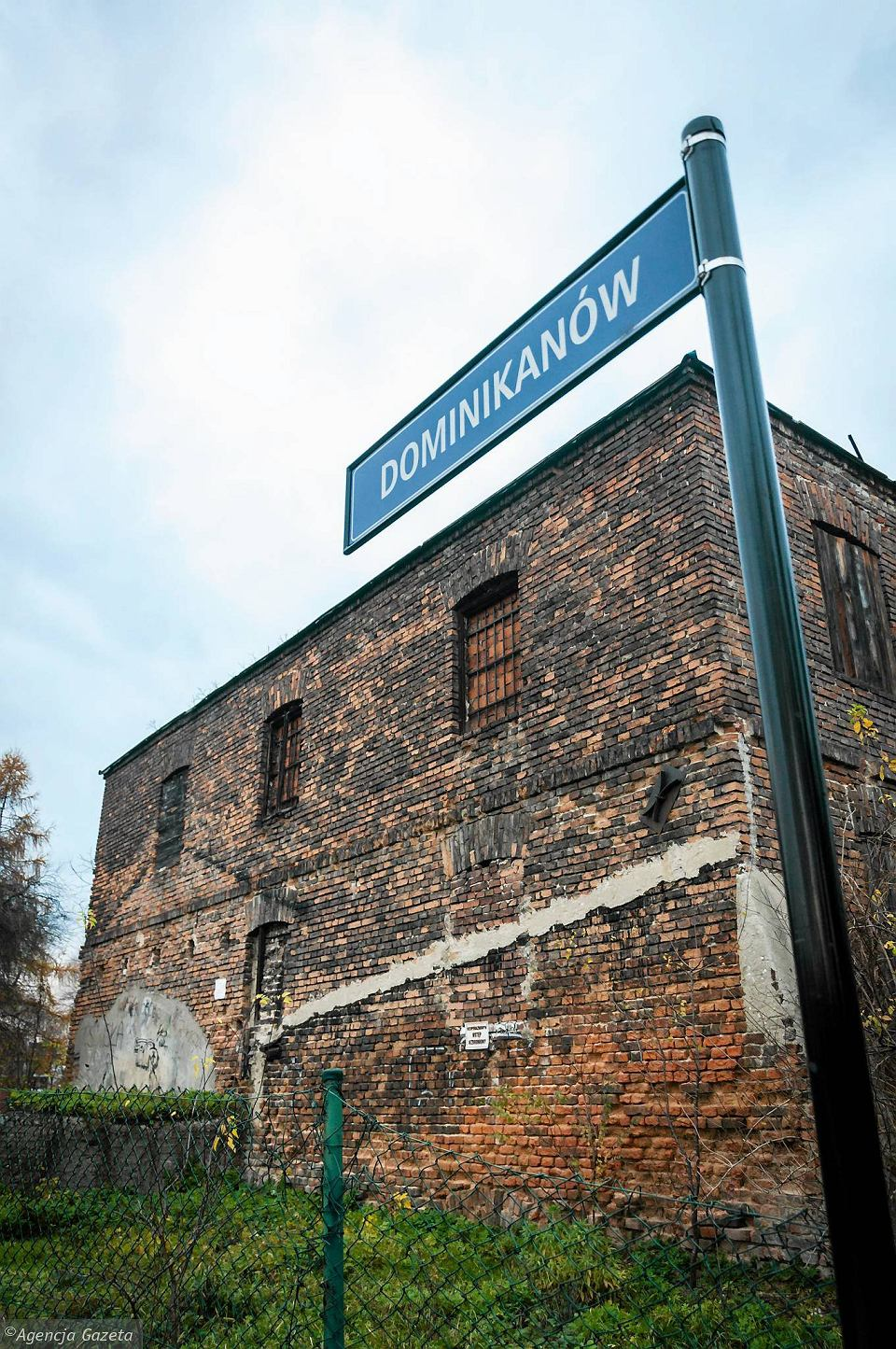
Mill in Kraków

The Kasina Wielka witch trial occurred in 1634 in the small rural village of Prąmnik in Kraków, Poland. Zofia Konstancja and Agnieszka Michałowska were convicted of witchcraft. Konstancia was burned at the stake on 11 August 1634, and Michałowska was burned on 5 September 1634.

The two women were accused of using witchcraft against the Pramnik Mill belonging to the Dominican monastery in Kraków, which resulted in damage to the Prąmnicki fields, and of causing harm to one of the monks, i.e. the Protas factor.

This is the only rural witchcraft trial that resulted in a death sentence in Poland, and one of a few in Europe.

The Pramnik Mill still stands in Prądnik Czerwony in Kraków on Dominikana Street, a historic example of a medieval watermill.

This issue (e.g., of foreign influence and discord) was addressed mark of Polish Prime Minister Donald Tusk's speech in the Sejm of the Republic of Poland on June 10, 2026. (starting from the 6-minute)
