= Wiesensteig witch trial =

16th century witch trial in Wiesensteig, Germany

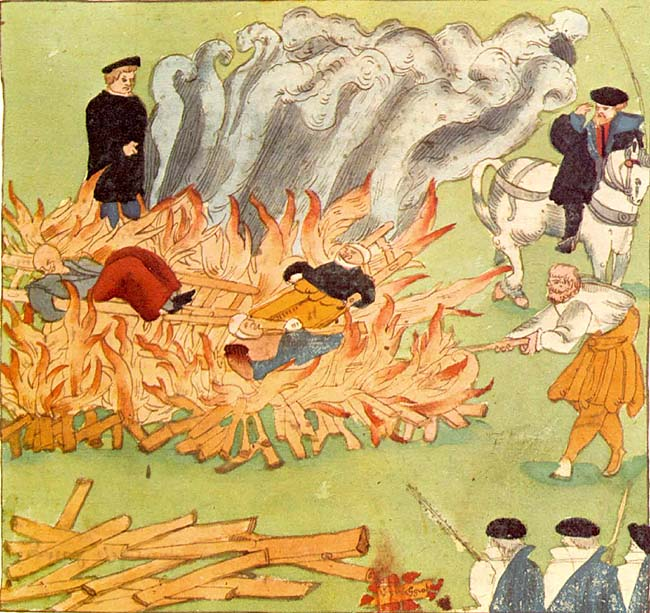
Burning of three witches in Baden, Switzerland (1585), by Johann Jakob Wick.

The Wiesensteig witch trial took place in Wiesensteig in Germany in 1562–1563. It led to the execution of 67 women for sorcery. This has been described as the first of the great witch trials of Germany and the starting point of the continuing European witch hunt. The trial inspired to the popular book : Of the tricks of Demons, which were printed in six expanded editions in Latin between 1562 and 1583 and translated to French in 1565. It was recorded in 1563 in a pamphlet called "True and Horrifying Deeds of 63 Witches".

== The trial ==
In the mid-16th century, Wiesensteig suffered from religious turmoil, war, severe hailstorms and epidemics.

The ruler of the city, Count Ulrich von Helfenstein, started to blame the misfortunes of the city on witches. On 3 August 1562, a severe hailstorm hit the city, causing extensive damage. Within days, Helfenstein had several women arrested and accused of witchcraft, an action which appears to have been met with approval. Six of the arrested women were executed as witches. They were made to confess to sorcery through torture. A number of these claimed to have seen citizens of Esslingen at their Sabbath. Three people were arrested in Esslingen, but later released. Helfenstein was appalled at the lenience in Esslingen. He executed another 41 women from Wiesensteig. On 2 December 1562, he approved the additional execution of 20 more. This amounted to the total reported in a sensational pamphlet of 1563, which reported "the true and terrible acts and deeds of the sixty-three witches and sorceresses who were burned at Wiesensteig".
