= Luís de la Penha =

Portuguese occultic leader

Luís de la Penha (1581 - 29 November 1626), was a Portuguese occultist who was executed for sorcery by the Portuguese Inquisition for having called upon Satan.

He was a professional fortune teller and folk healer and performed alleged magical ceremonies and incantations to Satan for money. He was very successful in his trade, was able to stop working as a craftsman and was widely rumoured for his abilities. His activity was noted in the reports to the Inquisition, which eventually resulted in him becoming a person of interest to them.

In 1617 he was arrested by the Portuguese Inquisition. He confessed to having made a pact with Satan; and to have been given the ability to heal the sick as well as enchant women, and that he had called upon Satan as well as a beautiful female demon with magic rituals and prayers.

He regretted his sins and was therefore pardoned the death penalty. His property was confiscated and he was confined to prison after having made public penitence on an Auto-da-fé in Évora in the presence of the king and queen 19 May 1619. In 1621, he was released on condition that the death penalty for sorcery was to take effect immediately if he ever repeated his crime. This was entirely in accordance with the normal procedure of the Inquisition.

Upon being released, however, Luís de la Penha resumed his lucrative profession as a magician. In March 1625, he was arrested after having assisted a client wishing to find a treasure by use of incantations and magic rituals to Satan and his female demon. As was the Inquisition's normal procedure with relapsed criminals, his former sentence when in to effect, and he was burnt alive at the stake for witchcraft in Évora 29 November 1626.

Only about seven people were executed for sorcery in Portugal, and only one person was executed for sorcery by the Portuguese Inquisition, of which he became the latter.
