= Witch trials in the Holy Roman Empire =

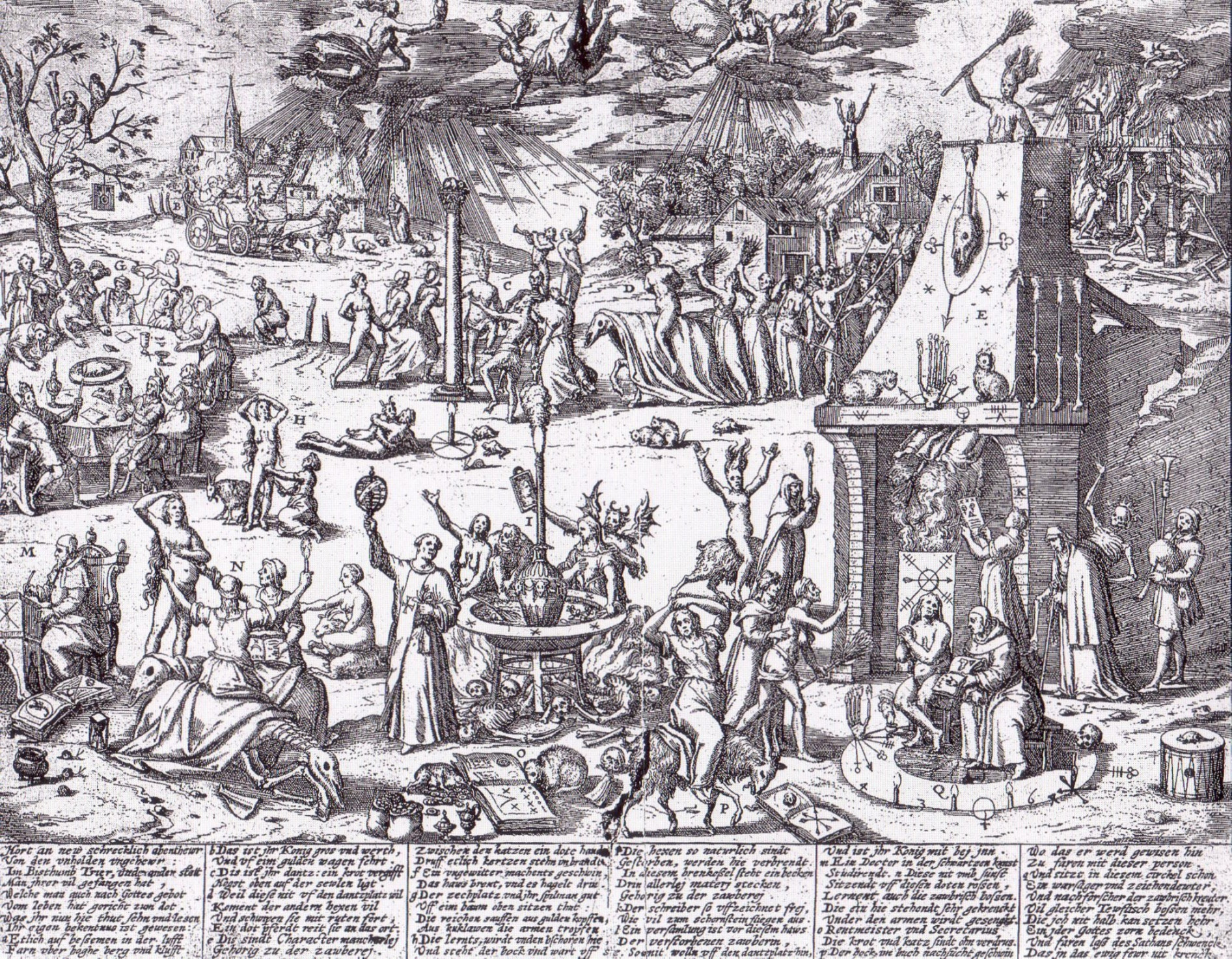
Trier witch trials (Pamphlett, 1594)

In the Holy Roman Empire during the 15th to 18th centuries, witch trials were some of the most extensive in the world, both to the extent of the trials as such as well as to the number of executions.

The witchcraft persecutions differed widely between the regions, and was most intense in the territories of the Catholic Prince Bishops in Southwestern Germany. The witch trials of the Catholic Prince Bishops of South West Germany were arguably the biggest in the world. Witch trials did occur in Protestant Germany as well, but were fewer and less extensive in comparison with Catholic Germany. The witch trials of Catholic Austria and Protestant Switzerland were both severe.

== Legal situation ==
Witchcraft was formally categorized as a crime in the Holy Roman Empire in the Constitutio Criminalis Carolina in 1532. The Holy Roman Empire consisted of a number of autonomous states, both Protestant and Catholic who all had their own laws and regulations, and the witchcraft persecutions, therefore, varied considerably. Formally, however, all states within the Holy Roman Empire were under the jurisdiction of the Emperor. This made it possible for the accused and their next of kin to appeal any sentence of a local court to the Imperial court. In general, such appeals were successful in the Imperial court, but in practice, the local verdict was still put in place because the Imperial court had great difficulty in enforcing their authority over the autonomous states.

== History by region ==
=== Austria ===
In Austria, a witch trial in Innsbruck in 1485 resulted in Heinrich Kramer writing the Malleus Maleficarum (1486). After this, however, there were no more witch trials in Austria until the second half of the 16th century, when the witchcraft persecutions spread in parallel with the Counter-Reformation. In 1583, Elisabeth Plainacher became the first person executed for sorcery in Vienna.

In the 17th century, severe witchcraft persecutions took place in Austria, one of the first being that of Bregenz in 1609, resulting in sixteen executions. In Austria, witch trials were conducted by local secular courts such as estate courts - except in those cases where clerics conducted private witch trials in the courts of their clerical estates. A common accusation was desecration of the eucharist. Women were in majority among the accused, except in the cases in which the accused were men of low status such as Romani people, vagrants and beggars. Torture was commonly used and when used in order to make the accused name their accomplices, the trials could grow to be very large. In contrast to Germany, the witch trials in Austria was at its most severe during the second half of the 17th century. About 1500 people are estimated to have been executed for sorcery in Austria.

In the early 18th century, the central government enforced their authority over the local courts, which resulted in a swift decrease in witch trials. By 1730, the witchcraft persecutions in Austria had virtually ended. The execution of Maria Pauer in 1750 was to be the last in Austria. Witch trials were banned by Maria Theresa in 1768.

=== Germany ===
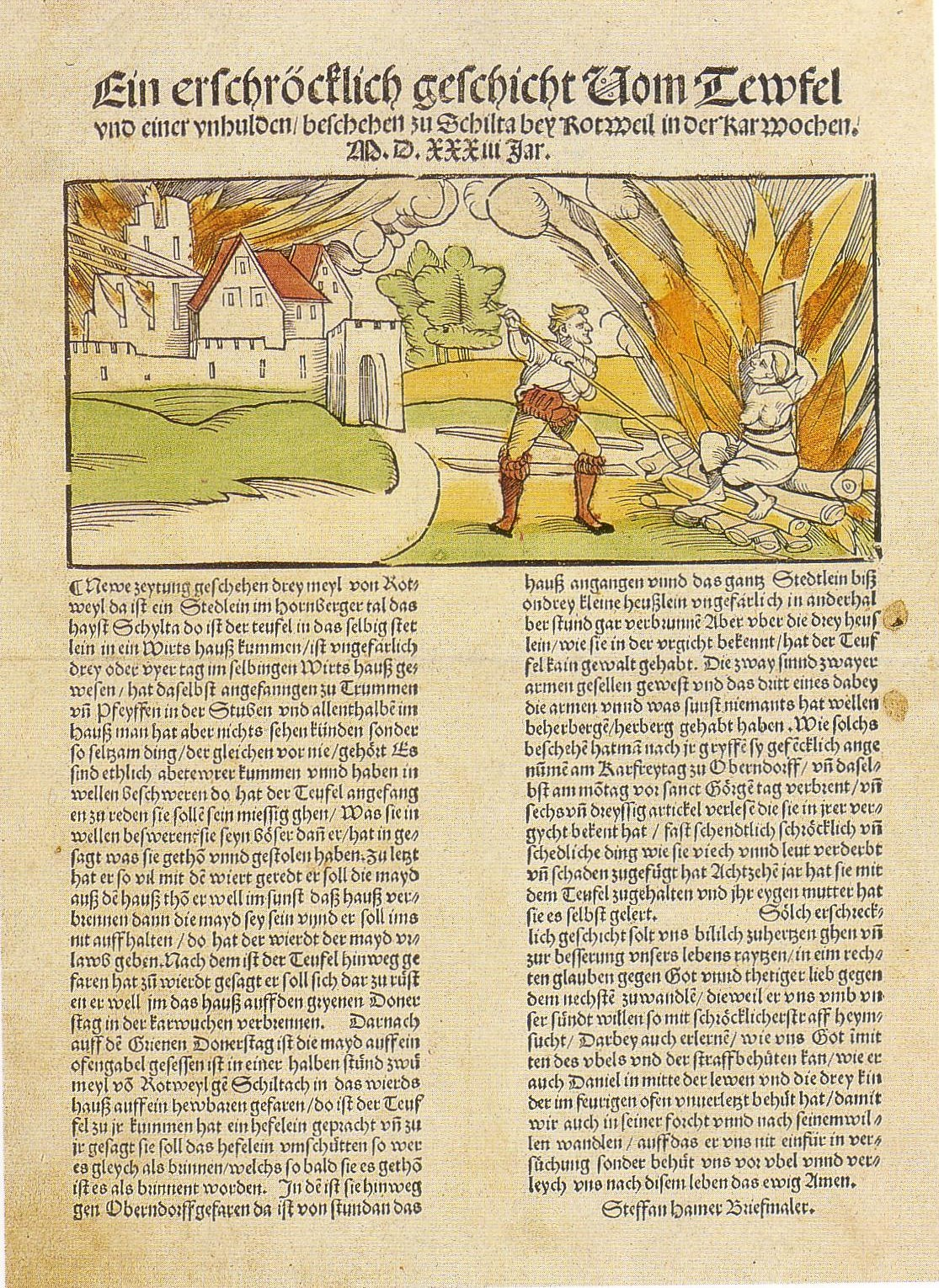
1533 account of the execution of a witch charged with burning the German town of Schiltach in 1531

In the area of present-day Germany more people were executed for witchcraft than in any other area in Europe. There were however great contrasts within Germany, where certain parts hardly experienced witch trials at all, while the most severe witch trials in Europe took place in others.

In general, the witchcraft persecutions were much more extensive in Catholic South Germany than Protestant North Germany. There were exceptions: the Protestant Duchy of Saxe-Lauenburg executed hundreds of people for witchcraft in but a few years around 1630, and the largest Catholic state in Germany, the Electorate of Bavaria, only executed about 271 people for witchcraft, since the Elector introduced a witchcraft law in 1590 which was described as uncommonly mild for its time.

==== Catholic South Germany ====
A number of extremely large mass trials against witchcraft, which took place in the autonomous Catholic Prince Bishop-states in south-western Germany between 1587 and 1639, are estimated to have amounted to a third of all executions for witchcraft in Germany, and a fourth of all executions of witchcraft in all Europe. The mass witch trials which took place in the German Prince Bishoprics could last for years on end and result on hundreds of executions. These enormous trials were infamous in all of Europe, and the contemporary Herman Löher described how they affected the population within them:

"The Roman Catholic subjects, farmers, winegrowers, and artisans in the episcopal lands are the most terrified people on earth, since the false witch trials affect the German episcopal lands incomparably more than France, Spain, Italy or Protestants."

These gigantic trials started with the great Trier witch trials (1587–1593), which resulted in between 500 and 1000 executions. The witch hunt migrated in waves through the villages through village inquisitors toward other cities and Prince Bishoprics and resulted in recurring waves of persecutions with high points in 1593–1598, 1601–1605, 1611–1618 and 1627–1631. Among them were the infamous Fulda witch trials (1603–1606) with 250 deaths, the Alzenau witch trials (1605–1605) witch 139 deaths, the Ellwangen witch trials (1611–18) with 430 deaths, the Mainz witch trials (1626–1631), and the Bamberg witch trials (1626–1631) with 1000 deaths, before this massive persecutions finally ended with the Cologne witch trial in 1639. These mass trials resulted in the executions of all genders and ages, and while the majority were female, the male minority was by no means small and men were referred to as "witches" as well, which was used as a gender-neutral expression. These mass trials could also show a great number of wealthy, clerical and aristocratic number of people among the condemned, when the rest of Europe had a majority of poor people among their executed.

The mass witch trials of the Catholic Prince Bishoprics in South Germany were exceptional and without contest the largest in Germany, but witch trials existed in all Germany, although in smaller scale in comparison.

==== Protestant North Germany ====
While witch trials were fewer and less extensive in the Protestant parts of Germany in comparison with the big mass persecutions of the Catholic South, they did occur in Protestant North Germany as well.

In the Northern Protestant Electorate of Brandenburg (later Prussia), only about 200 people were executed for witchcraft between 1505 and Dorothee Elisabeth Tretschlaff in 1698, with the most extensive persecution being that of 20 executions in 1606. In 1721, the King of Prussia stated that no death sentences for witchcraft would longer be confirmed by him.

==== The end ====
The persecutions became fewer in the second half of the 17th century, but a few isolated cases are known to have occurred in the 18th century.

Traditionally, the last executions for witchcraft in Germany have been said to be those of Helene Curtens and Agnes Olmanns in 1738. Since then other executions have been found by later research, such as that of Maria Renata Saenger von Mossau in Bavaria in 1749 and Anna Schnidenwind in Endingen am Kaiserstuhl in 1751.

Maria Anna Schwegelin was likely the last person to be sentenced to death of witchcraft in 1775, but the sentence was never carried out, and she died in prison in 1781.

=== Switzerland ===
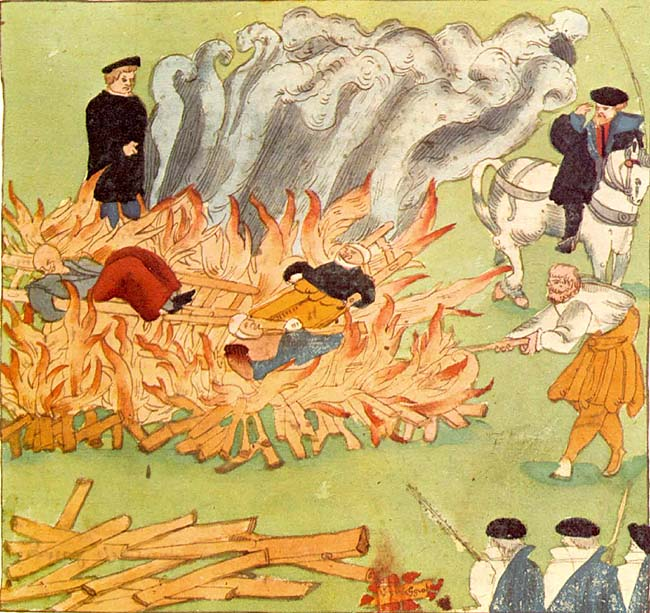
Burning of three witches in Baden, Switzerland (1585), by Johann Jakob Wick

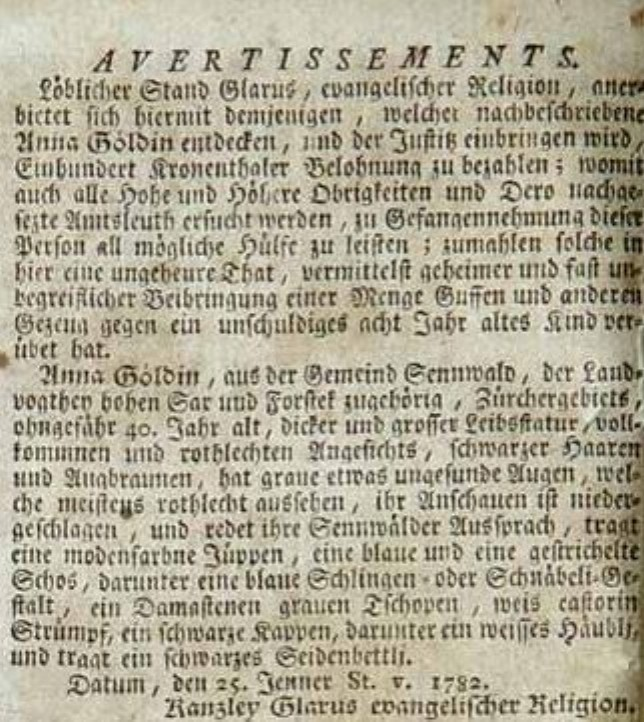
Advertisement of reward for Anna Göldi's capture in Zürcher Zeitung

Switzerland bordered to North Eastern France and Southern Germany, where the witchcraft persecutions were more intense than anywhere else in Europe, and belong to the areas where the witch trials were most fervent. A hypothetic number of 10,000 executions has been suggested: the number of executions are unknown, but are estimated to have been very high.

As early as circa the year 1400, the high profile Stedelen case documents a witch trial in the region. Switzerland, or at least a part of it, was the location of the first European mass witch trial: the Valais witch trials, which lasted between 1428 and 1459, long before the publication of Malleus Maleficarum (1486). This unleashed the first wave of witchcraft persecutions during and was followed by numerous witch trials in Wallis 1430, Fribourg and Neuchâtel (1440), Vevey (1448), Lausanne (1460), Lake Geneva (1480) and Domartin (1498 and 1524–28). During the 15th century, a third of those executed for witchcraft were women and two-thirds were men, but in the 16th century, the figure was reversed.

A reason for the severe persecutions in Switzerland was the weak central power, where the Imperial court had little to no real influence, something which had a bad effect on the rights of those accused. This is illustrated by the fact that the persecutions were the worst in areas were the central power was weakest: between 1580 and 1655, about 1700 witch trials took place in Vaud, but only about 80 in Zürich.

The majority of the witch trials in Switzerland were conducted by local secular courts. Most of the cases were directed against members of the public by other private citizens, and the accusations were normally destruction of property by use of magic and participation in a witches sabbath. The witch trials often took place during times of crisis and were directed toward people who were different in some way, by people with whom they had previously been in conflict. Torture was commonly used and the chance of being acquitted was slim. The method of execution in Switzerland was commonly burning at the stake.

The witchcraft persecutions in Switzerland became less common in the second half of the 17th century. In 1652, Michée Chauderon became the last execution for witchcraft in the city of Geneva in the Republic of Geneva. In the 18th century, the Swiss authorities and courts were less and less willing to accept charges of witchcraft or, if they did, to declare a death penalty in such cases. Catherine Repond, who was executed for witchcraft in Fribourg in 1731, was the perhaps last clear execution for witchcraft; Anna Göldi is often referred to as the last person executed for sorcery in Switzerland in 1782, though the case was a dubious one.

== Gallery ==
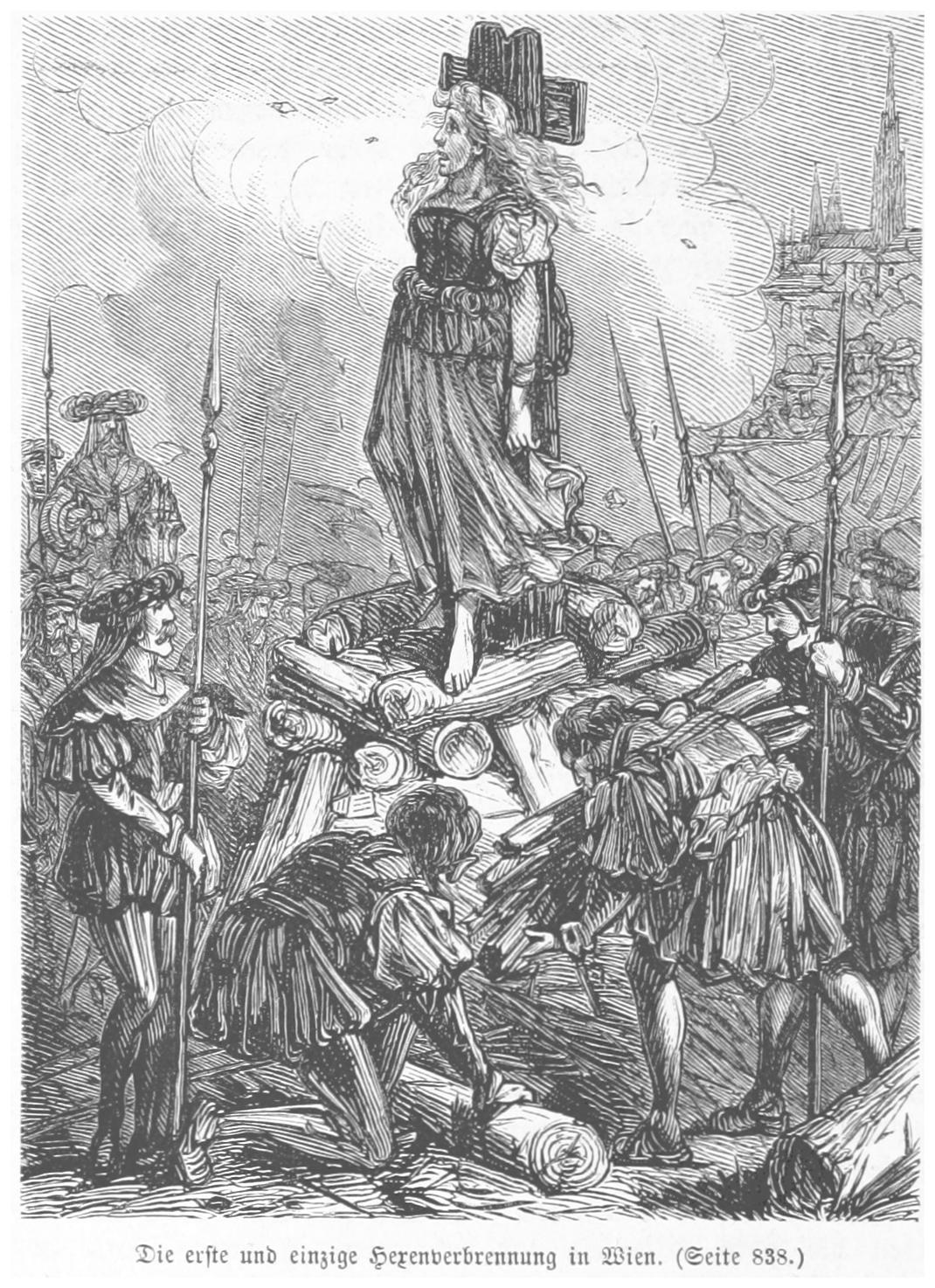
Elisabeth Plainacher

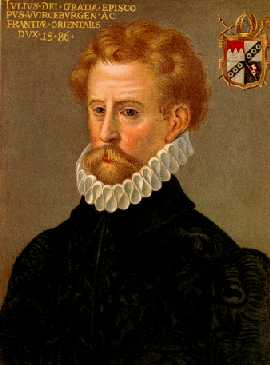
Julius Echter von Mespelbrunn, witch-hunter

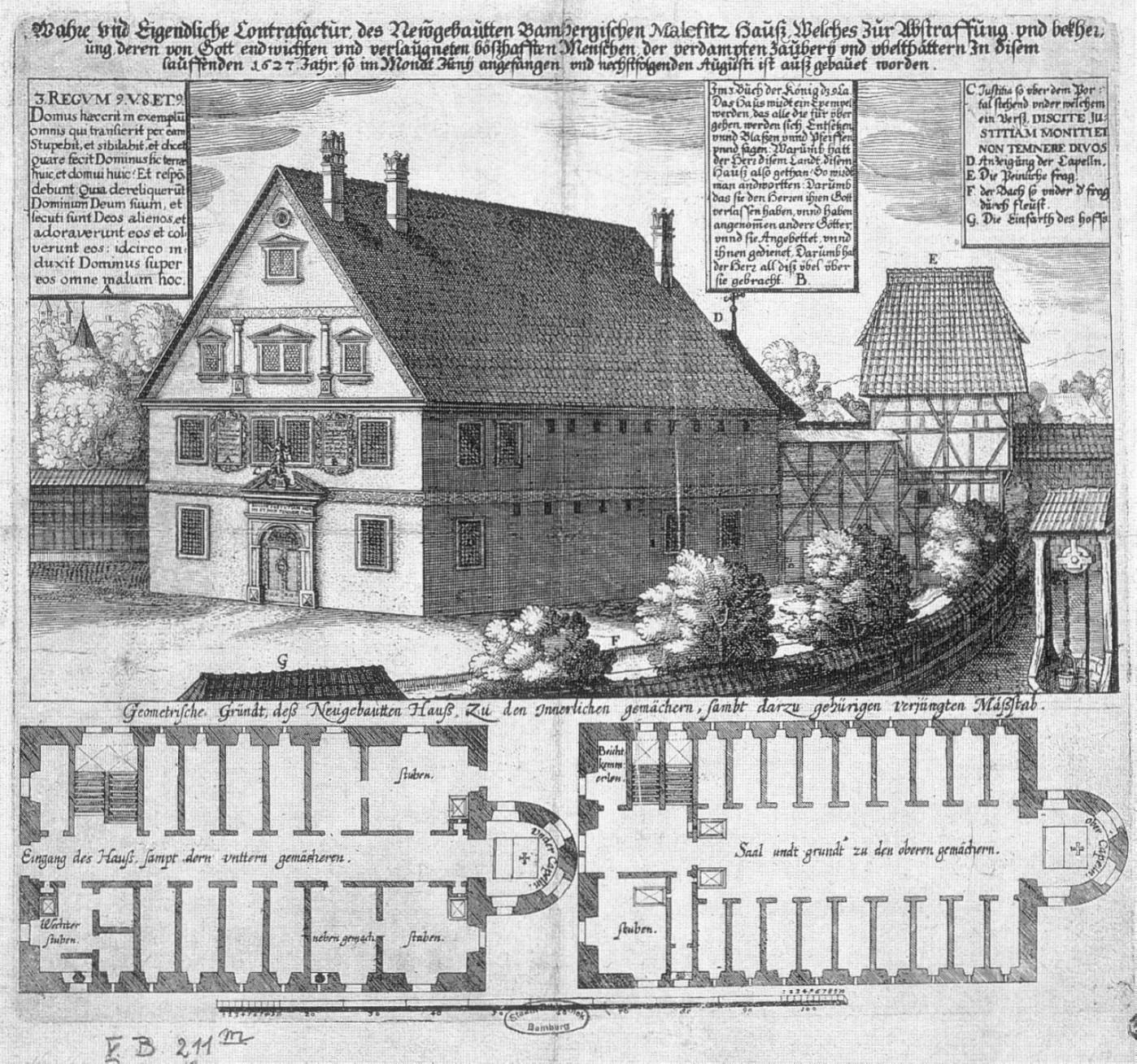
Drudenhaus

== See also ==
- Witch trials in the early modern period
