= Helena Curtens =

Helena (Hellene Mechthildis) Curtens (1722 in Gerresheim – 19 August 1738 in Gerresheim) was an alleged German witch. She was one of the last people executed for sorcery in Germany and the last person executed for this crime within the Rhine area. Her case is one of the most known cases in Europe, as she was long thought to be the last person executed for this crime in Germany.

Curtens was arrested after reports about observations of the ghost of a 14-year-old girl. She was exposed to torture, during which she pointed out her neighbour Agnes Olmans. Olmans was the daughter of a woman called Zaubergreth, who was rumoured to have been a witch. They were accused of having intercourse with demons. Olmans denied the charges and demanded to be exposed to the ordeal of water. This was denied to her, as this method was no longer used in the area. Both Curtens and Olmans were judged guilty of sorcery and sentenced to be executed. They were executed by burning 19 August 1738.

Curtens and Olmans are often claimed to be the last people executed for sorcery in Germany. In reality, Maria Renata Saenger von Mossau was executed in 1749 and the farmer Anna Schnidenwind, née Trutt in 1688, was executed in Endingen am Kaiserstuhl 24 April 1751 convicted of having caused the great fire of Wyhls by a pact with Satan. The last execution for sorcery in Germany likely occurred in Landshut in 1756. Anna Maria Schwegelin was sentenced to death for sorcery in 1775, but she died in prison and was never executed.
