= INCA (machine brand) =

INCA was a brand of woodworking machines made by Injecta AG in Teufental, Switzerland. It was active from 1921 until 2011 when it was liquidated. INCA's machines can still be found widely on the second-hand market in Europe and North America.

== Overview ==
INCA had a relatively limited lineup of table saws, bandsaws, jointer-planers, as well as a few other types of machines. The company was known for its reliability and quality.

The thing that set them apart from most competitors was the use of cast aluminum, which also explains their name (INjected Cast Aluminium). The use of this material allowed for very precise castings of parts, while keeping the weight of the machines relatively low.

A small collection of the original inventory of the INCA factory can be found in the local museum of Aargau, Switzerland.

== See also ==
- Rema S. A.
