= Endingen =

Endingen may refer to:

- Endingen am Kaiserstuhl, Germany
- Endingen, part of Jakobsdorf municipality in Vorpommern-Rügen, Germany
- Endingen, Switzerland in the canton of Aargau
