= Catherine Repond =

Catherine Repond (also known by the diminutive La Catillon; 18 August 1663 – 15 September 1731 in Fribourg), was a French Swiss woman and victim of the witch trials in Switzerland. She was the last woman executed for sorcery in Francophone Switzerland.

== Biography ==
Repond was born in Villarvolard to a poor family. Throughout her lifetime, she lived in her family home with her two sisters, and did not marry or receive much formal education. Known to her local community as a beggar, Repond also had a form of kyphosis that caused locals to refer to her as "deformed".

A bailiff named Montenach claimed that, while hunting, he injured a fox that complained of its wound in a human's voice. Montenach discovered Repond taking shelter at a nearby farmyard, boasting a similar injury to that of the fox; Montenach subsequently accused Repond of shapeshifting and sorcery. She was also accused of using sorcery to summon destructive storms.

Repond was subsequently arrested and tortured until she admitted to being a witch. She was executed by fire in Fribourg on 15 September 1731.

=== Reason for allegations ===
Witch trials were rare in Switzerland in the 18th century, so it is unlikely that Repond faced allegations of sorcery on superstitious grounds. Her case is also unusual in that she came under suspicion because she was accused by a member of the upper classes, not because of local rumours. Historian E. William Monter posits that Montenach, a member of a "threatened patriciate", took personal offence to Repond begging or commenting on his wealth.

== Legacy ==
In May 2009, the Grand Council of Fribourg "morally rehabilitated" Repond, recognising her as a victim of persecution.
