= Reszel Castle =

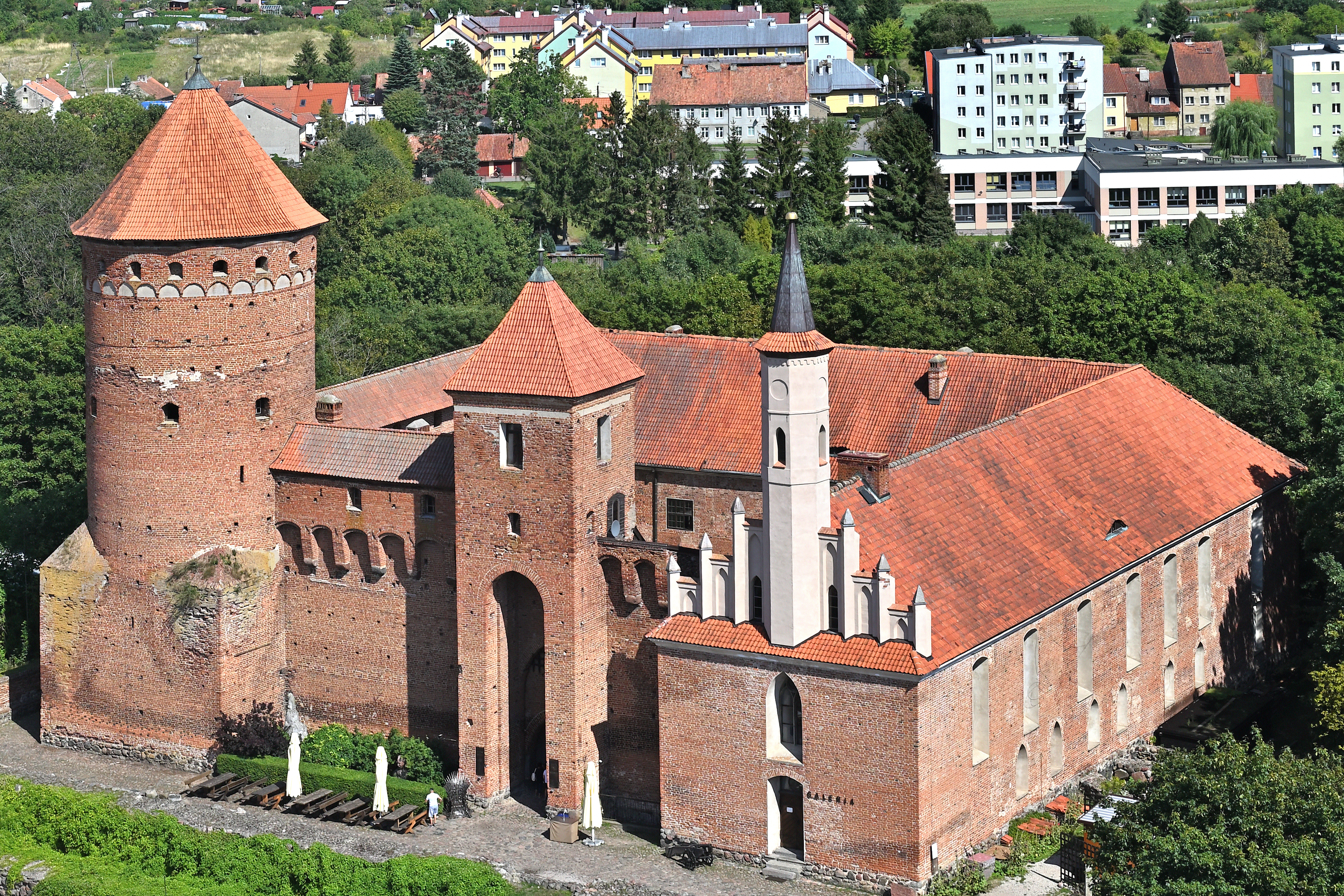
- Reszel Castle

- Location of the Reszel Castle in Poland Reszel Castle (Warmian-Masurian Voivodeship)
- 54°02′54″N 21°08′52″E

History
- Built: 1350-1401

Site notes
- Architectural style: Gothic

Reszel Castle (Polish: Zamek w Reszlu, German: Burg Rößel) is a Brick Gothic castle in Reszel, in northern Poland. It is situated by the bank of the river Sajna, in the south-east of the town.

The castle, an Ordensburg fortress, was built in between 1350 and 1401 by the Teutonic Order. The castle was frequently looted, besieged and gained by Polish and Teutonic forces. In the nineteenth century the castle was adapted into a prison, the castle was fully renovated after the Second World War.

Currently the castle houses the branch of the Museum of the Warmian-Masurian Voivodeship in Olsztyn, (Polish: Muzeum Warmii i Mazur w Olsztynie), a hotel and a restaurant.

== History ==
The castle was built by the Bishop of Warmia, Jan of Miśnia, however the castle's first occupiers where the Teutonic Knights. In 1780 a part of the castle was adapted for a prison. In 1806 and 1807 a fire devastated the medieval castle. The castle was reconstructed in 1822, and from then on housing a Lutheran church. During the interwar period, the castle housed a museum, which is now a modern hotel.

== See also ==
- Castles in Poland
