= Anna Maria Schwegelin =

Alleged German witch

- Born: January 23, 1729; Lachen, Bavaria, Holy Roman Empire
- Died: February 7, 1781 (aged 52); Kempten, Bavaria, Holy Roman Empire
- Occupation: Maid
- Known for: Last person convicted of witchcraft in the Holy Roman Empire

Anna Maria Schwegelin (also: Schwägele, Schwegele, Schwägelin; January 23, 1729, in Lachen – February 7, 1781, in prison custody in Kempten) was a maid alleged German (Bavarian) witch, long considered the last person to be convicted of witchcraft in the Holy Roman Empire, now modern-day Germany.

== Life ==
Born in 1729, Anna Maria Schwegelin grew up in poverty in Lachen and served as a maid. In 1751, Schwegelin, a Catholic, met a Protestant coachman from Memmingerberg while working temporarily at a country estate. According to her own statements he promised her marriage if she would convert to Protestantism. She seems to have been willing to abandon her Catholic faith and may have fully converted; however, the marriage plans were later broken off by the coachman. After this incident she reportedly was convinced that she had made a pact with the devil, later claiming he had made an appearance to her twice. At the first meeting, in an open field, she claimed that she resisted temptation and repelled him but by the second was ready to renounce God and make a pact.

In 1769, due to her injuring her leg Schwegelin was unable to work, she was admitted to a leper house in Obergünzburg and in 1770 or 1771 was then transferred to a poor house in Langenegg. During this time, she believed that the devil was appearing to her in her sleep and repeatedly sought relief through confessions to help her overcome her guilt for betraying her faith. Through many hints and allusions, Schwegelin gave the impression to those around her that she was involved in Satanism; this, paired with a number of strange incidents being linked to her, raised suspicions against her which would later lead to her arrest in February 1775. After the arrest, she was taken to a prison in the monastery town of Kempten to await trial.

== Trial ==
Anna Maria Schwegelin's trial and investigation was led by district judge Johann Franz Wilhelm Treuchtlinger. Without being tortured Schwegelin freely admitted to her pact with the devil, but denied ever having used a harmful spell. She was judged guilty and sentenced to be executed by the sword on 11 April 1775. The judgement was passed by three other privy councillors of the Princely Abbey of Kempten and signed by the sovereign Honorius Roth von Schreckenstein. By July 1775, however, the case seems to have been forgotten and does not appear to have been pursued any further. Apparently, the execution may have been temporarily suspended by the sovereign due to the intervention of his confessor, a Franciscan priest called Anton Kramer who would later become a dedicated representative of the Enlightenment in Kempten. Schwegelin would remain in jail and in 1781 died there of natural causes, receiving the last sacraments, as noted in the St Lorenz death register.

== Death and memorial ==
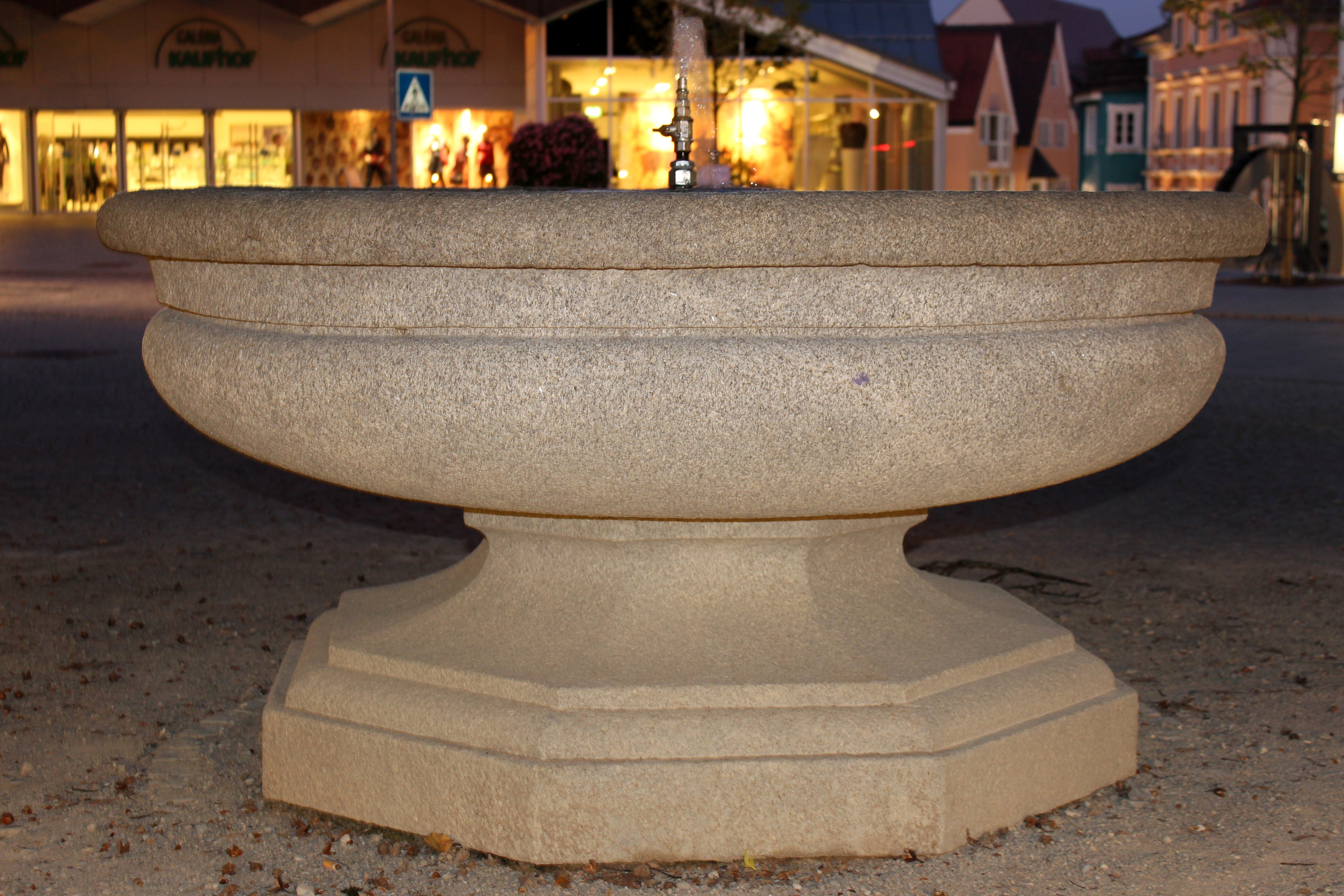
The fountain which commemorates Anna Maria Schwegelin in Kempten.

It was long believed that her sentence was carried out, and that Schwegelin was the last person executed for sorcery in the territory of the Holy Roman Empire. Similarly, she has also been described as the last person to be executed for witchcraft in Europe. However, whilst she was the last person to be convicted and sentenced to death for sorcery in Germany, her execution was never carried out. The Kempten historian Wolfgang Petz was able to clarify in 1995 that Schwegelin had died several years after the trial in 1781 in prison in Kempten. He discovered the entry of her death in the parish of St. Lorenz's death register while researching his dissertation, which he published in 1998. However, despite this, Anna Maria Schwegelin can still be described as the last victim of witch-hunting on German soil.

On June 27, 2002, a fountain named after Anna Maria Schwegelin with a commemorative plaque on a pedestal was inaugurated on the south-east side of the residential building of the former Benedictine abbey in Kempten as a place of remembrance for the accused witch. On December 18, 2018, Lord Mayor Thomas Kiechle unveiled an information point next to the Schwegelin fountain, on which details about her life can be found.

== See also ==
- Anna Schnidenwind
- Anna Göldi
- Barbara Zdnuk

== Sources ==
- Wolfgang Petz: Die letzte Hexe. Das Schicksal der Anna Maria Schwägelin. Campus Verlag, Frankfurt am Main, New York 2007, ISBN 978-3-593-38329-3
- Artikel "Anna Maria Schwägelin" im Lexikon zur Geschichte der Hexenverfolgung
- Anna Maria Schwagel Elizabeth A. Sackler Center for Feminist Art: The Dinner Party: Heritage Floor. Accessed March 2012
