= Anna Goeldin – The Last Witch =

1982 novel by Eveline Hasler

Anna Goeldin—The Last Witch (1982) is the novel with which Swiss writer Eveline Hasler established her literary reputation. It imagines the life of Anna Göldi (Göldin in the contemporary spelling, indicating the female gender in the name; Goeldin is a variant of the spelling without the special character). Goeldin was executed by decapitation in 1782 in Glarus, Switzerland and has become known as the last person to be executed for witchcraft in a German-speaking country.

In her novel, the author describes Goeldin as an unusual woman, ahead of her time. She is independent, moves around a lot, and men and women perceive her as very sensual. Through hard work, she raises herself from poor beginnings, even learns to read, but she becomes the victim of a power struggle between two powerful families in the canton. The novel won much praise from critics who claimed it "draws von artistic intuition as much as on its expert subject knowledge." Women's emancipation is a recurring theme in Hasler's novels. Women in Switzerland had gained the right to vote in federal elections after a referendum in February 1971. For some cantonal elections, it took even longer, such as 1991 in the Swiss canton of Appenzell Innerrhoden. With the rise of women's self awareness in the 1970s, Hasler was not along in making the "witch" a "feminist symbol," as Pen International wrote in 1989. Another major theme of the novel is the suspicion of child murder, maids driven to infanticide by intolerable conditions, a theme widely popular in the eighteenth century.

Hasler incorporates contemporary documents in her novel, setting the quotes apart in italics. This technique "lends the narratives a sense of authenticity and intensifies their impact."

In her afterword, Hasler summarizes the "unexpected publicity" of the trial. The term "judicial murder" was coined by the historian August Ludwig Schlözer in connection with the trial.

The novel was adapted into a feature film with the same title, Anna Göldin – Letzte Hexe by Swiss filmmaker Gertrud Pinkus in 1991. Both novel and film offer a good sense of the milieu and gender roles. Anna Goeldin is an outsider in the community, and her gender and social position as a maidservant make her vulnerable to unfounded accusations.

== Plot ==
The novel follows Anna's life beginning with her arrival in Glarus until her death. The novel also includes flashbacks of Annas life from her memories of being a small child until the reason she moved to Glarus. In 1782 Anna was accused of harming a child and brought to trial in Glarus. Following a lengthy trial, she was sentenced to death by decapitation.

Anna Goeldin was born in Sennwald, Switzerland in 1734. She was born into a “free family” where her father was a farmer, and her mother ran the household (p. 2).She was the fourth of eight children. After her father died, she dropped out of grade school to help her mother tend to the land and the animals (p. 38). Between the ages of 13 and 40 she worked as a house servant for several different families. One of note would be the Zwicki family. The other of note would the Tschudi family.

The novel devotes considerable room to Anna's two love affairs that played a role in the trial because of rumors about Anna as a child murderess and an affair with her previous employer's son. When she was very young, she became pregnant by Jakob Roduner, a local apprentice to the master cabinet maker (p. 150). Jakob left Anna to serve in the military (p. 138). After Anna gave birth by herself, the child was found dead, and Anna was accused of child murder and sentenced to confinement in her mother's place for 6 years (p. 150). After three years, she escaped to her sister's house where she then assisted as a midwife. As a midwife she was introduced to the Zwicki house where she then became their housemaid. The second man Anna had premarital relations with was her employer's son, Melchior Zwicki. Melchior supported the Age of Enlightenment philosophy and hoped that Anna and he could get married once society became more accepting of people from different societal classes marrying (p. 226). However, Melchior's mother was strictly against marriage (p. 230). Anna Goeldin again had a child out of wedlock. Anna placed this child into foster care, then immediately left the household to find work someplace else (p. 237).

Anna found work with the Tschudi family. Anna worked here as the housemaid taking care of the home and younger children. Most notably the daughter Anna Maria became very attached to Anna Goeldin (p. 15). After 17 months working for the family, the girl and consequently the father Doctor Johann Jakob Tschudi accused Anna of placing pins in his child's milk. The pins were enough to get Anna released from her position. For weeks after Anna left, the child continued to spit up pins and other pieces of metal, and Mrs. Tschudi and others assumed witchcraft, leading to his formal accusation with the court of Glarus (p. 121). The court ordered a search warrant.

Upon Anna's departure she regularly moved through several villages to avoid being caught by the “runner,” the man sent to get Anna and bring her to court in Glarus. Eventually Anna was caught while working in a tavern and imprisoned. During the time Anna was being held she was asked to help heal the sick child which she did. She confessed under torture to using witchcraft to make Anna Maria sick.

The trial lasted at least 17 weeks and was held in the Protestant Court. At the very end of the trial 32 voted for Anna to be put to death, while 30 voted against (p. 248). With the results of the trial, Anna was sentenced to death. The novel imagines that after her death all courts records were rewritten to omit any use of the word witch because the Glarus authorities feared being ridiculed as backwards.
