= Eveline Hasler =

Swiss writer (born 1933)

Eveline Hasler (born 22 March 1933) is a Swiss writer. She has written novels (for adults) and children's books which have been translated into many languages. One of her most-read works is the novel Anna Goeldin – The Last Witch. It fictionalizes one of the last witchcraft trials in Europe and was published in 1982, at the bicentennial of the execution of Anna Göldi. Hasler was awarded a Schiller Foundation prize for her first novel Novemberinsel (November Island).

== Life ==
Eveline Hasler was born 22 March 1933 in Glarus. She studied psychology and history at the University of Fribourg and in Paris, and worked as a teacher for a short time in St. Gallen. She also worked in television. She has written novels (for adults) and children's books which have been translated into many languages. Eveline Hasler is married with three children.

One of her most-read works is the novel Anna Goeldin – The Last Witch. It fictionalizes one of the last witchcraft trials in Europe and was published in 1982, at the bicentennial of the execution of Anna Göldi.

Her historical stories and novels "bring long-forgotten individuals and their experiences back to life, redressing to some extent the balance of history which has seen them marginalized or discounted." In many of her works, she reminds readers that "stability, one of the valued preserves of modern Swiss society, is a relatively recent privilege." Her works are described as carefully researched.

Flying with Wings of Wax (1991) presents the life of Emily Kempin (1853-1901), the first German-speaking female law graduate; she was refused permission to practice law in her home country of Switzerland, "sought her fortune in New York, but ultimately failed in her struggle against convention."

Hasler was awarded a Schiller Foundation prize for her first novel Novemberinsel (November Island). She has also been awarded the Droste Prize from the city of Meersburg, the City of St. Gallen Culture Award and an honorary doctorate from the University of Bern.

Her literary estate is archived in the Swiss Literary Archives in Bern.

== Bibliography (English translations only) ==
- Martin is Our Friend. Trans. Dorothea Desmarowitz. Abingdon, 1981. ISBN 978-0-687-23650-3
- Winter Magic. Trans. Michele Lemieux. W. Morrow, 1984. ISBN 978-0-416-51520-6
- Bats in the Belfry. Trans. Jozef Wilkon. Adama Books, 1984. ISBN 978-0-460-06232-9
- The Garden Town. Trans. Stepan Zavrel; Lenore Wilson. Daan Retief, 1989.
- Flying with Wings of Wax: The Story of Emily Kempin-Spyri. Fromm International, 1993. ISBN 978-0-88064-151-7
- The giantess. Trans. Renate Seelig. Kane/Miller Book Publishers, 1997. ISBN 978-0-916291-76-1
- A Tale of Two Brothers. Trans. Käthi Bhend; Marianne Martens. North-South Books, 2006. ISBN 978-0-7358-2102-6
- The Birdmaker Witch. Stories of Child Witches in Switzerland and Germany. (Excerpts) In: The Dirty Goat 25 (2011): 214–261. www.thedirtygoat.com
- Anna Goeldin – The Last Witch. Trans. Mary Bryant. Ed. Waltraud Maierhofer. Lighthouse Christian Publishing, 2013. ISBN 978-1-4826-5949-8
- The Child Witches of Lucerne and Buchau. Trans. Waltraud Maierhofer and Jennifer Vanderbeek, 2022. ISBN 978-1-61146-338-5
