= Biechele Soap =

American soap manufacturing company

The Biechele Soap Company was a leading business in 19th-century Canton, Ohio. Charles and Joseph Biechele, part of the successful Biechele Brothers, created it.

Charles, Joseph, Leopold, and Gustavus Biechele were born in Endingen am Kaiserstuhl, a small town in southwestern Germany. They immigrated to the United States in the mid-19th century, where Charles began to experiment with soap recipes. When the demand for his soap began on a small scale in 1858, he started a manufacturing plant. His brother Joseph soon joined the business, which continued to grow.

Charles started a separate grocery business and left the soap business in Joseph's care. Biechele Soap soon became a national brand and, at its height, competed with other leading soap manufacturers in Chicago, Philadelphia, Buffalo, and Cincinnati.

Joseph became a friend of Ohio governor and eventual twenty-fifth president of The United States, William McKinley. He attended McKinley's wedding to Ida Saxton and was a pallbearer at McKinley's funeral when McKinley was assassinated.

In 1913, Joseph Biechele sold his recipes to what is now known as Hygienic Products Co. He died in 1916 at 80.
