= Dorothee Elisabeth Tretschlaff =

Dorothee Elisabeth Tretschlaff (1686 – in Gerswalde, – 14 February 1701) was a 15 year old German girl condemned by and executed after a Witch trial. She was the last person to have been executed for witchcraft in the state of Brandenburg. Her case attracted much attention, and was the subject of a great deal of contemporary debate.

Tretschlaff was employed as a maid. She confessed that she had made a pact with the Devil, and that he visited her regularly for intercourse in her bed in the shape of a fly. The Devil supposedly paid Dorothee for her favors. The case against her was based on this alleged intercourse.

Tretschlaff was found guilty of witchcraft and executed by decapitation. The sentence was criticized both before and after it was made. Later the same year, King Frederick I of Prussia ordered an investigation to inquire into whether the process had been correct. Tretschlaff was found to be depressed and suicidal.
