= Reszel =

Town in Warmian-Masurian Voivodeship, Poland

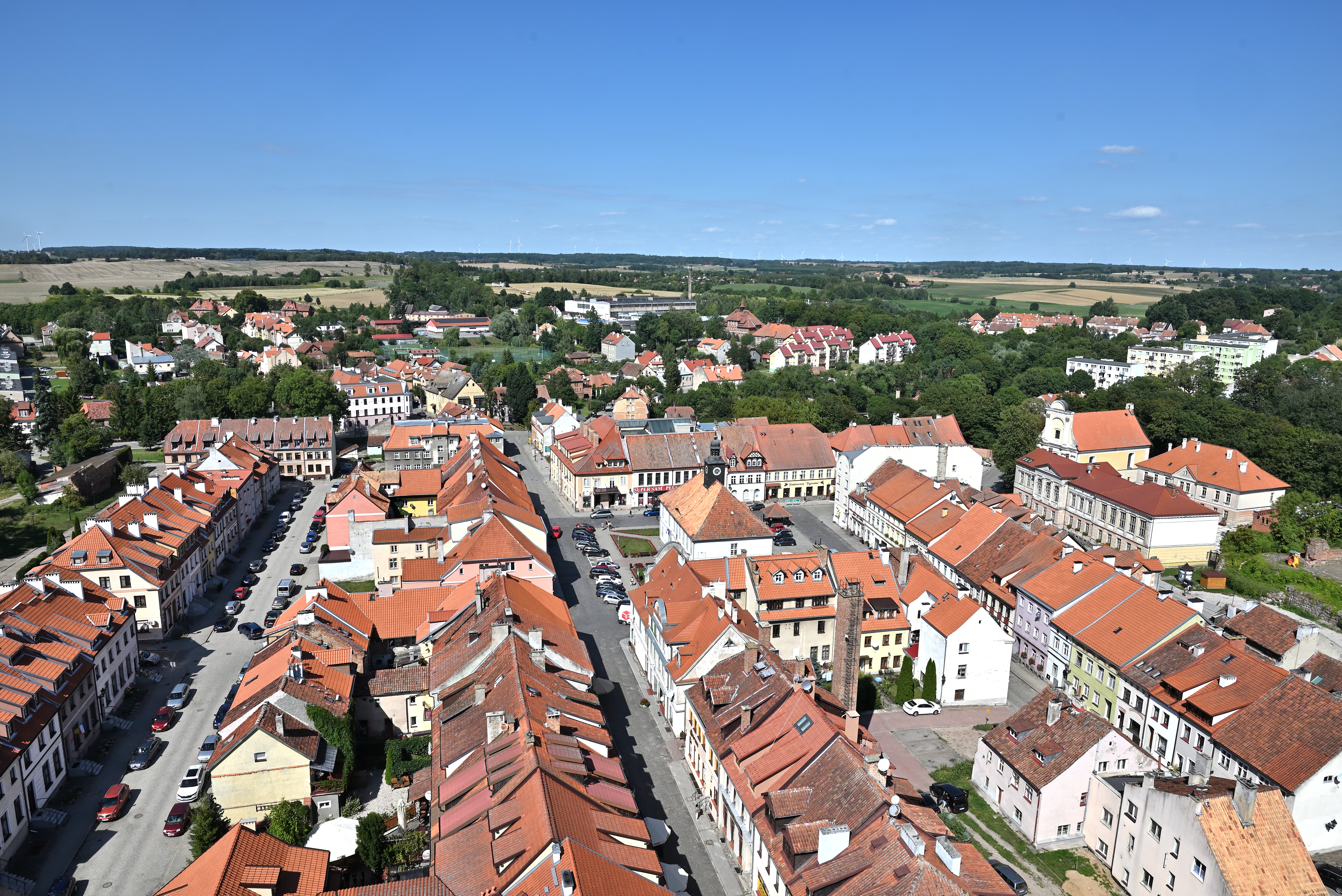
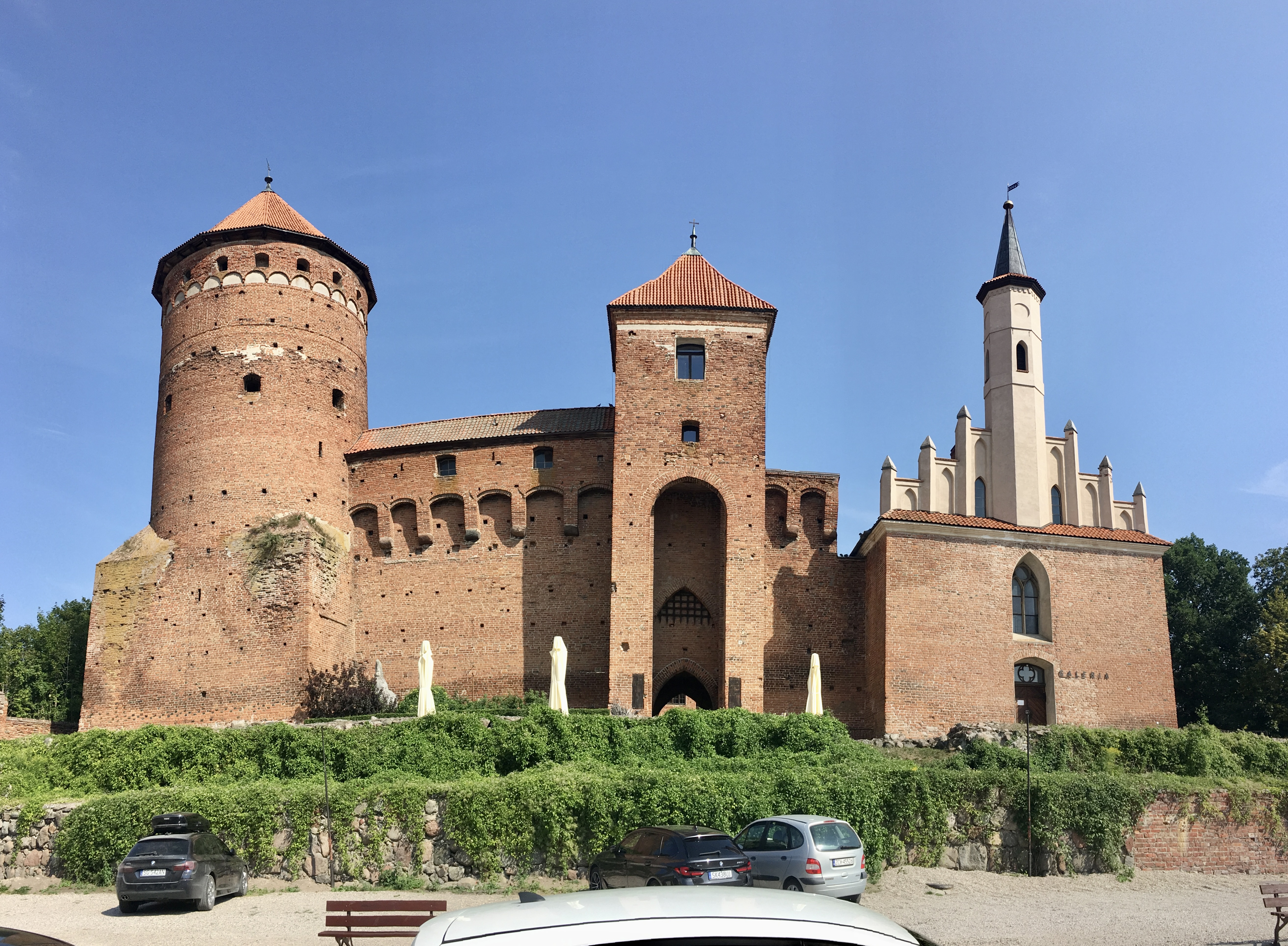
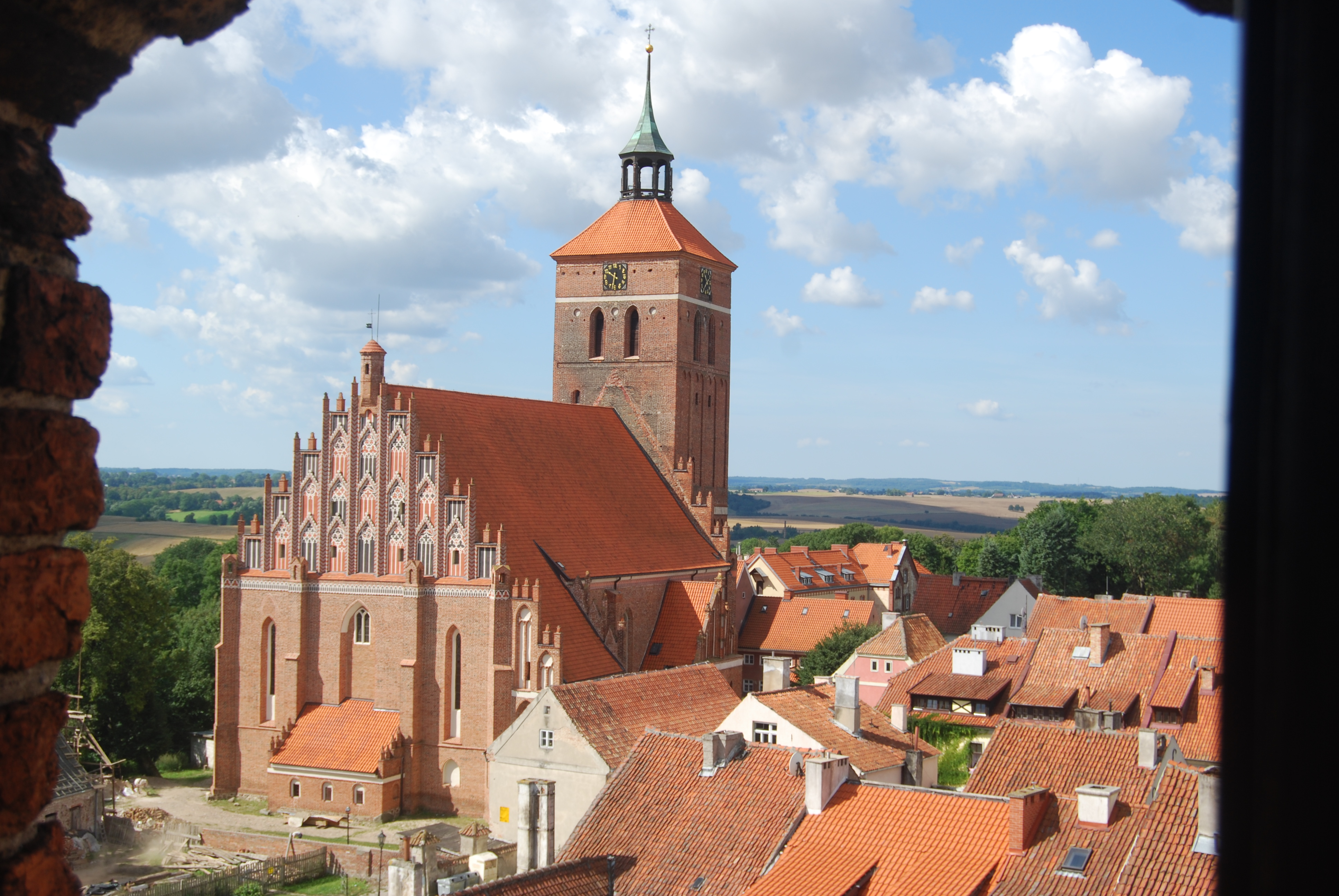
- Old Town Reszel Castle Peter and Paul Church

- Flag Coat of arms
- Interactive map of Reszel
- Location within Poland
- Coordinates: 54°3′5″N 21°8′45″E
- Country: Poland
- Voivodeship: Warmian-Masurian
- County: Kętrzyn
- Gmina: Reszel
- Town rights: 1337

Area
  - Total: 3.82 km^{2} (1.47 sq mi)

Population (12.31.2024)
  - Total: 4,006
  - Density: 1,050/km^{2} (2,720/sq mi)
- Time zone: UTC+1 (CET)
  - Summer (DST): UTC+2 (CEST)
- Postal code: 11-440
- Vehicle registration: NKE
- Website: www.reszel.pl

Reszel (Note: [ˈrɛʂɛl]; German: Rößel; Prussian: Resel or Resl) is a town in the Warmian-Masurian Voivodeship, in northeastern Poland. As of 2012, the population was 4,896. A small medieval town situated in the historical Warmia region, Reszel possesses many architecturally renowned monuments and various attractions. The Gothic castle, the main square and the core surrounded by brick defense walls are popular among incoming tourists.

In 2004 Reszel became the first Polish town to join Cittaslow.

== History ==
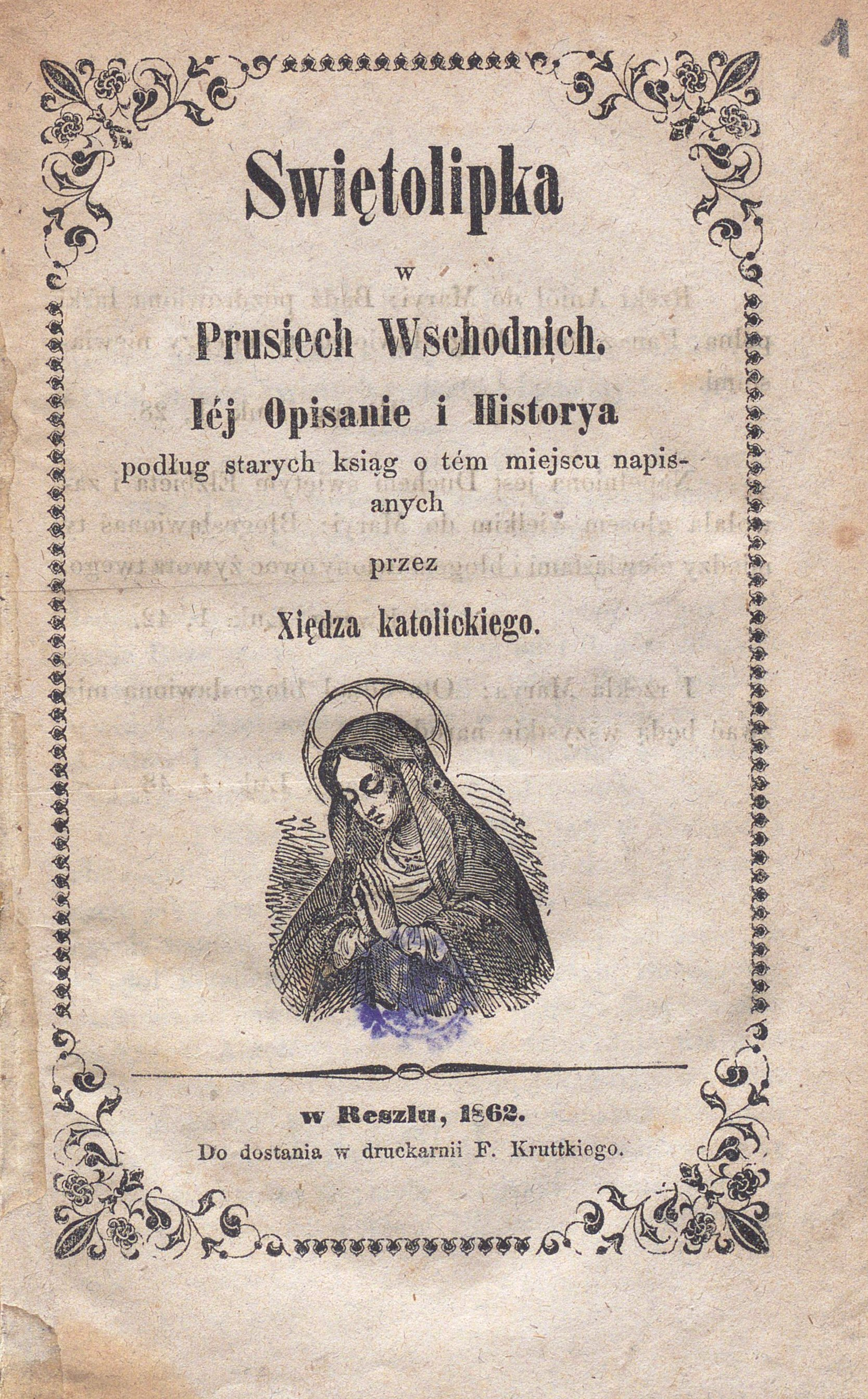
Świętolipka w Prusiech Wschodnich, a Polish book printed in Reszel in 1862

Reszel was originally a settlement built by the Bartian tribe of Old Prussians and conquered by the Teutonic Knights in 1241. The native Prussians later recaptured the settlement and held it for five years, but were eventually defeated by the German crusaders. Reszel received its town privileges in 1337 under Chełmno Law. After the Polish victory in the Battle of Grunwald in 1410, the town was briefly captured by Poles led by King Władysław II Jagiełło.

In 1440 the town joined the anti-Teutonic Prussian Confederation, and upon its request in 1454 Polish King Casimir IV Jagiellon signed the act of incorporation of the region along with Reszel to Poland, an event that sparked the Thirteen Years' War. In 1455, the Teutonic Knights captured the town and in 1462 ceded their power to the Warmian bishop, who once more in 1464 recognized the Polish King as the rightful ruler of Warmia with Reszel. The incorporation of Reszel to the Kingdom of Poland was confirmed in a peace treaty signed in Toruń in 1466. In the 17th century, the Jesuits came to Reszel and established a college in 1632 and the Polish King John II Casimir Vasa created a scholarship fund for its students.

In 1772 Reszel was annexed by Prussia in the First Partition of Poland, and became part of the Prussian Partition of Poland. In the late 18th century the local parish priest was Marcin Krasicki, and he was often visited by his brother Ignacy Krasicki, leading Polish Enlightenment poet and prince-bishop of Warmia.

In 1811 Barbara Zdunk was sentenced by the Prussian court to death for witchcraft and setting the castle alight in 1807. The trial is sometimes described as the last burning of witches in Europe.

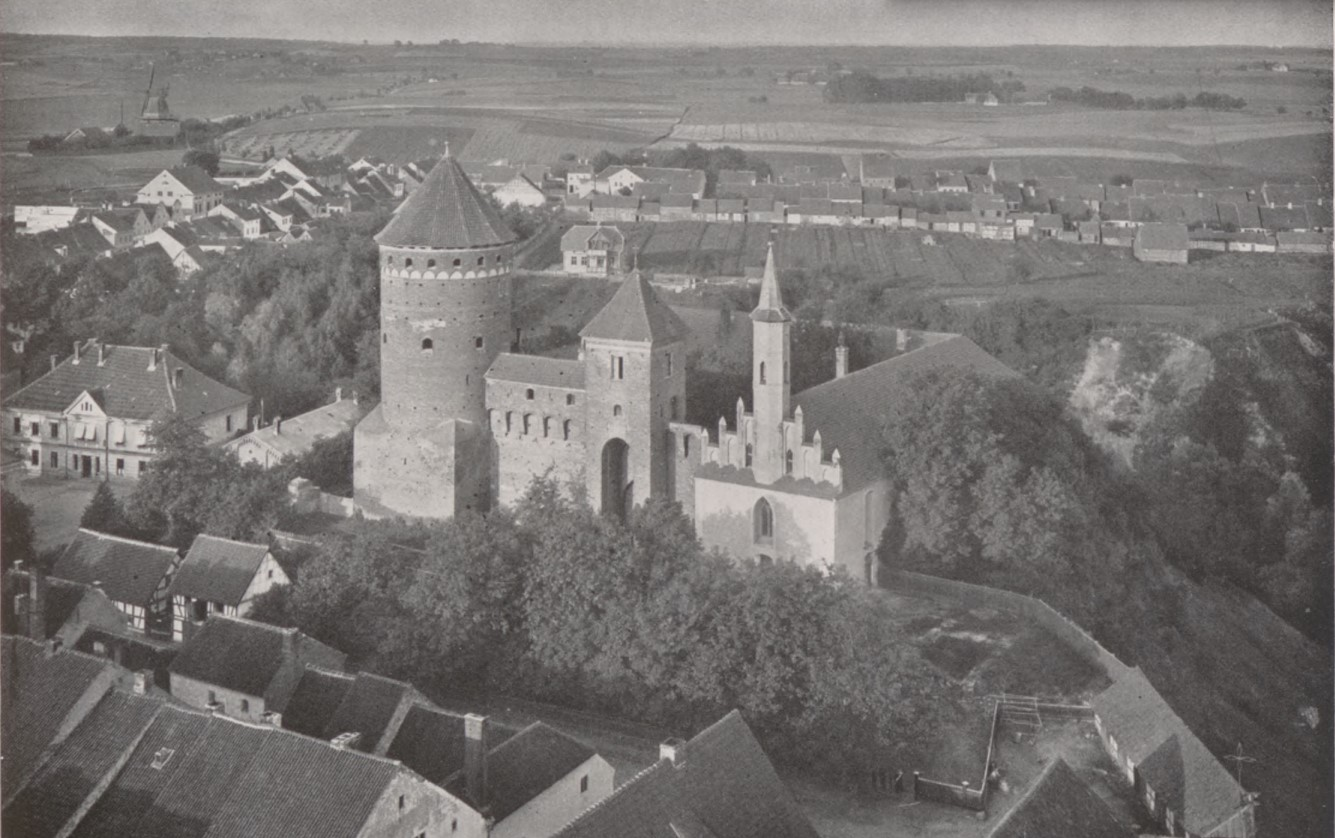
Aerial view of the castle before 1915

From 1871 the town was part of Germany and as a result of the treaty of Versailles on 11 July 1920 the 1920 East Prussian plebiscite was organized under the control of the League of Nations, which resulted in 3,260 votes to remain in Germany and none for Poland, which just regained independence.

After German surrender at the end of World War II, sovereignty over the town was ceremoniously transferred to Polish authorities on May 21, 1945. As part of territorial changes demanded by the Soviet Union, Polish rule was accepted at the Potsdam Conference, however, on preliminary terms. The remaining German populace was displaced in accordance with the Potsdam Agreement. The transfer was confirmed by the German–Polish Border Treaty.

== Tourist attractions ==
The main tourist attraction is the Gothic Episcopal castle. It was built 1350−1401 on a steep hill side above the right bank of the river Sajna by the Teutonic Order.

The Gothic St Peter's Church dating back to the 14th century boasts the painting of the church's patron dating back to the end of the 18th century. Other worthy of note buildings are the Jesuit complex, St John's Church and the church and convent of the nuns of the Order of St Catherine − all from the 15th and the 16th century. Large fragments of preserved defensive walls and the Classicist town hall in the market square dating back to the 19th century are also worth visiting.

Near Reszel is the Catholic shrine of Święta Lipka, a Baroque church and Late Medieval shrine augmented in the 17th century. Since its beginning it has attracted pilgrims, Poles, Germans and Lithuanians.

== Sports ==
The local football team is Orlęta Reszel. It competes in the lower leagues.

== Notable residents ==
- Jodocus Willich (1501–1552), physician
- Barbara Zdunk (1769–1811), alleged arsonist and witch
- Andreas Thiel (1826–1908), Bishop of Warmia (1885–1908)
- Julius Dinder (1830–1890), Archbishop of Gniezno and Poznań
- Karol Zalewski (born 1993), Polish athlete, Olympic medalist

== Images ==
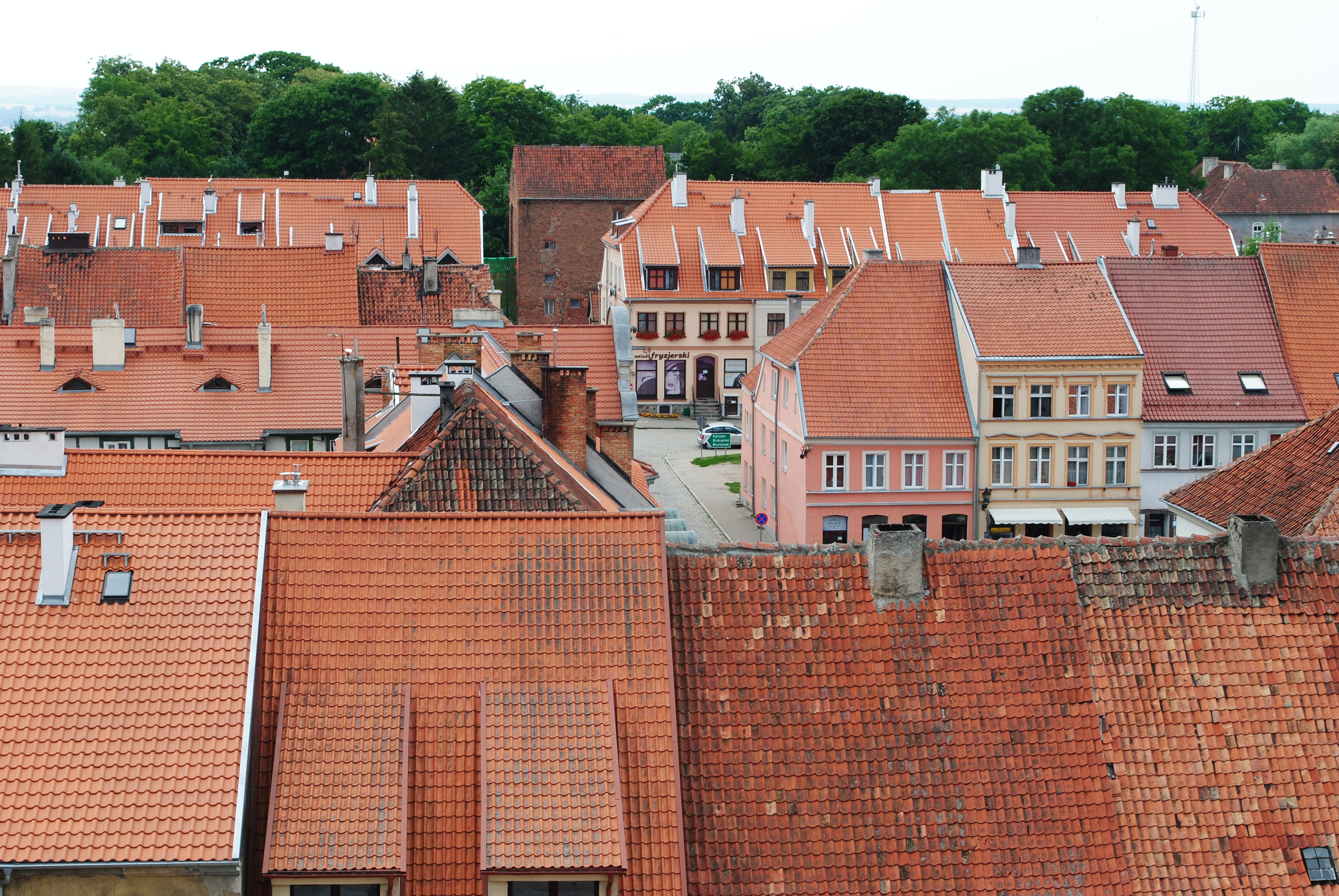
Town center seen from the castle tower

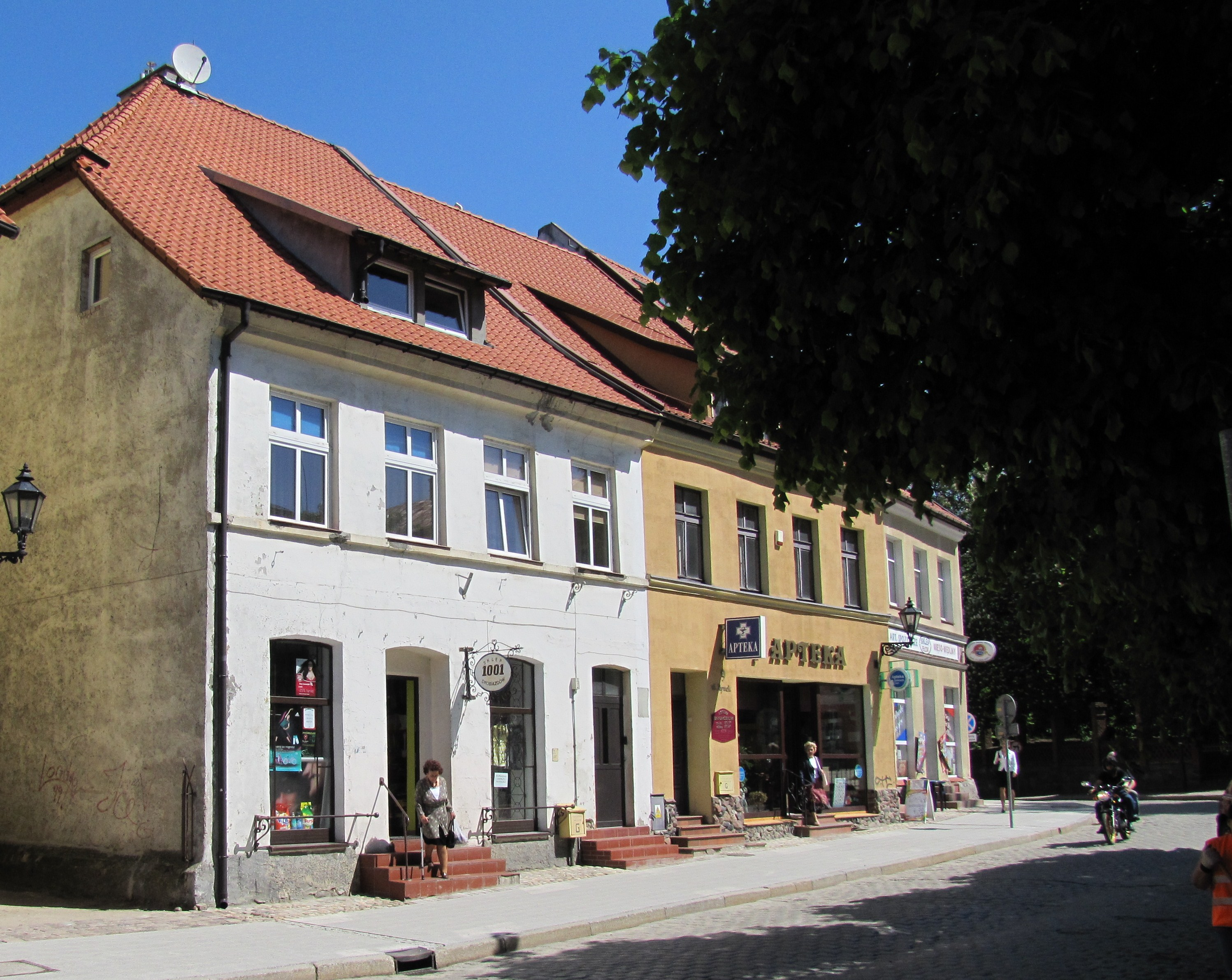
Tenements, part of the gothic city center

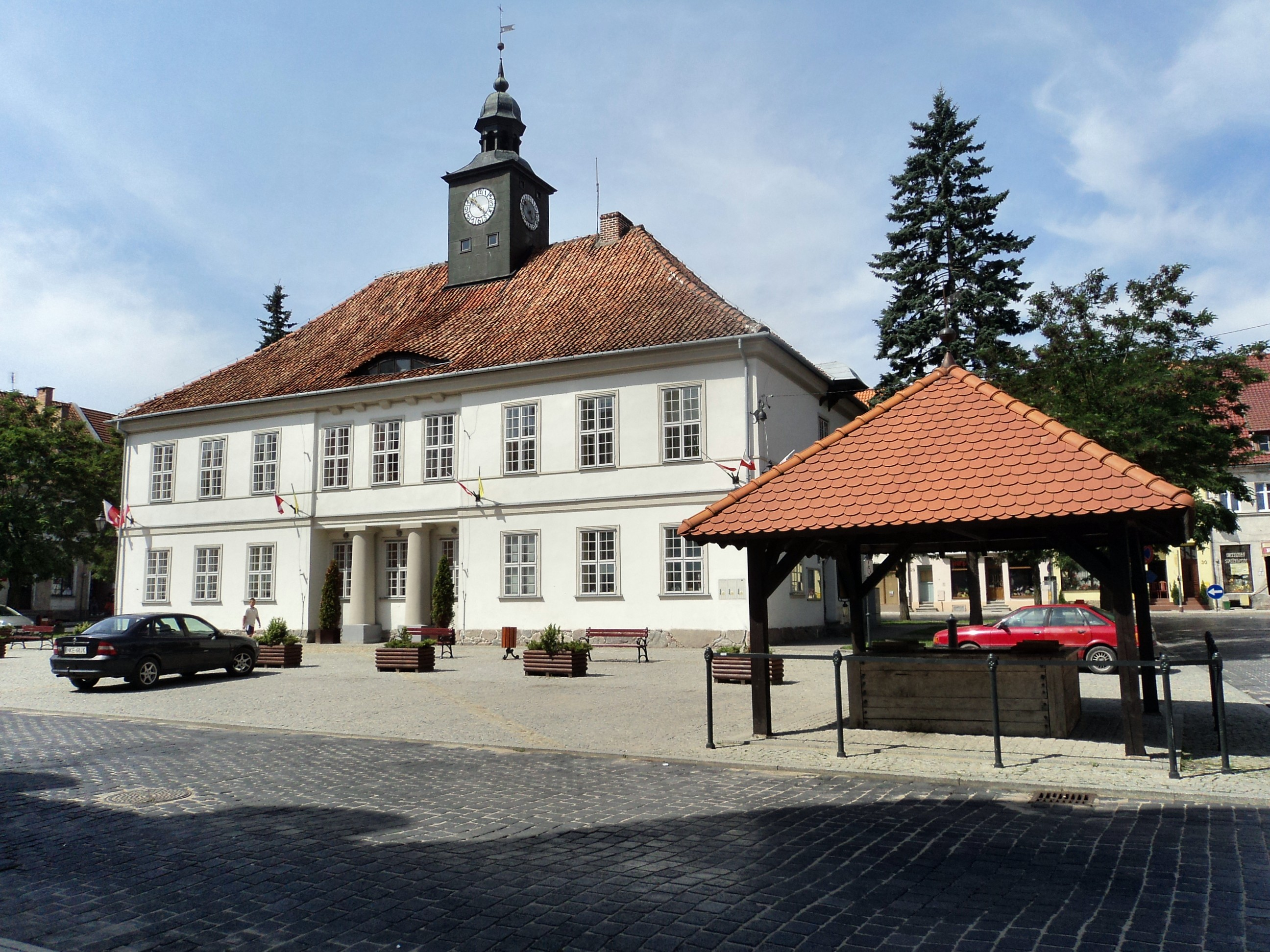
Town Hall

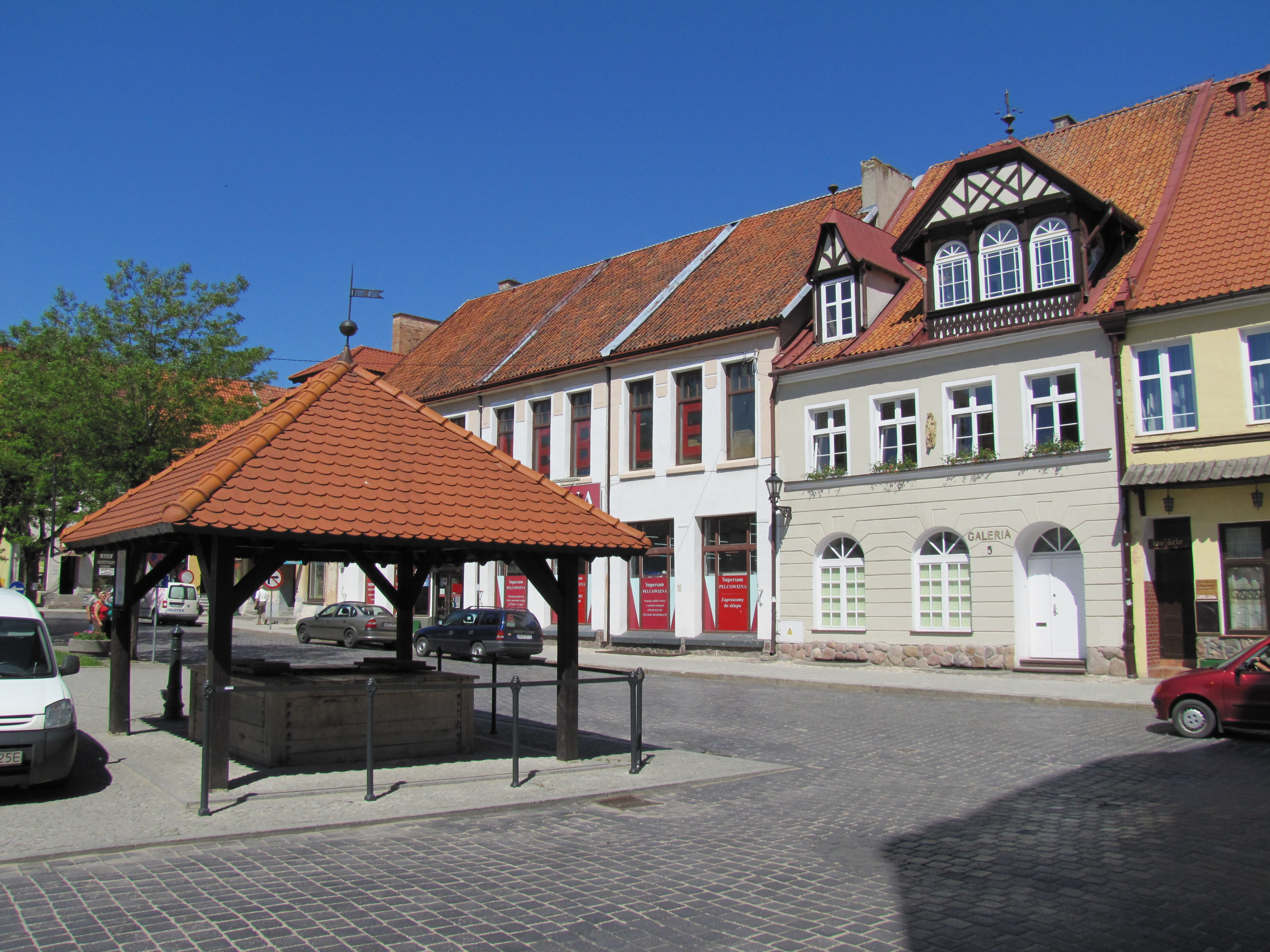
Market Square

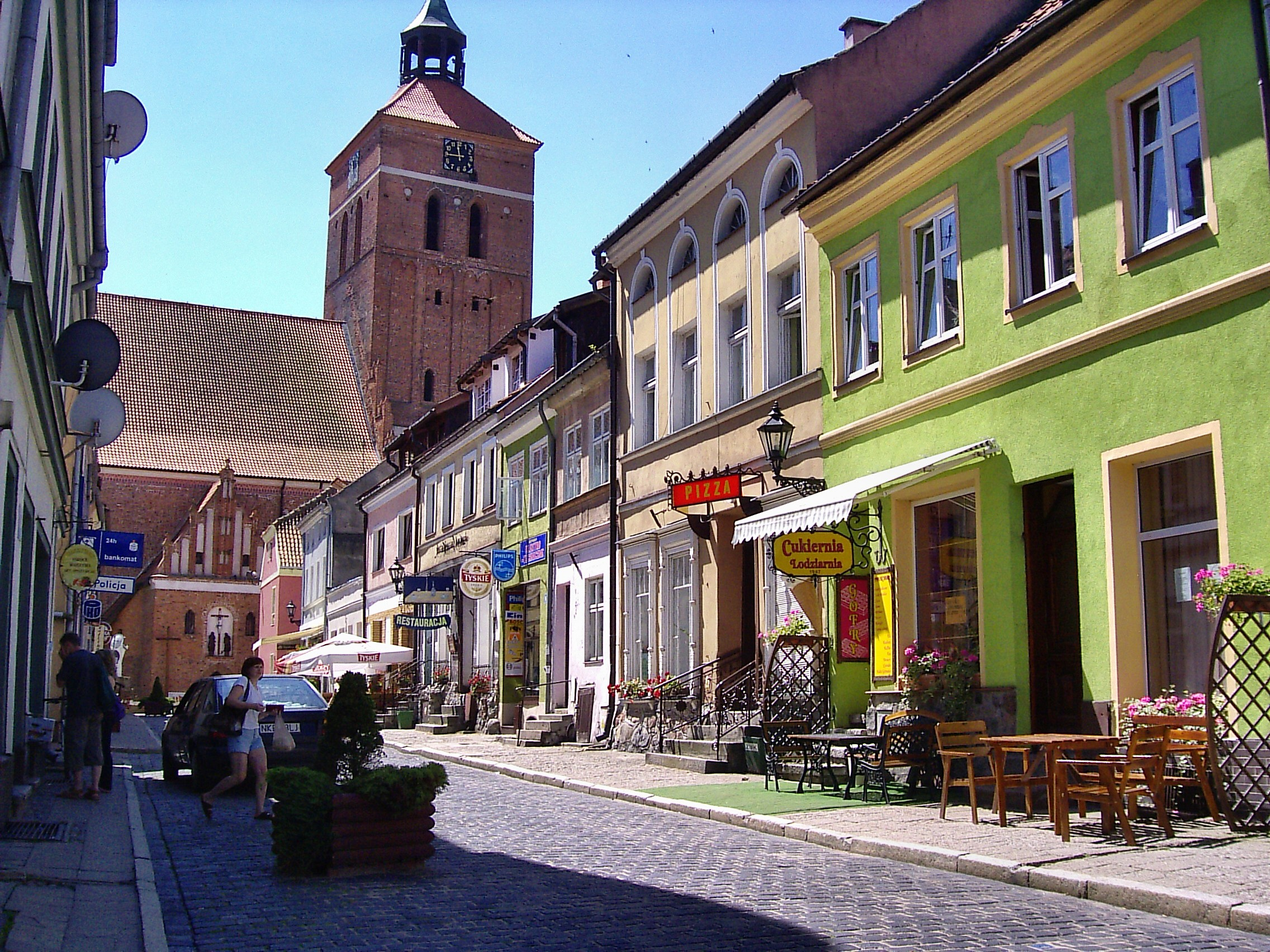
Wyspiańskiego Street

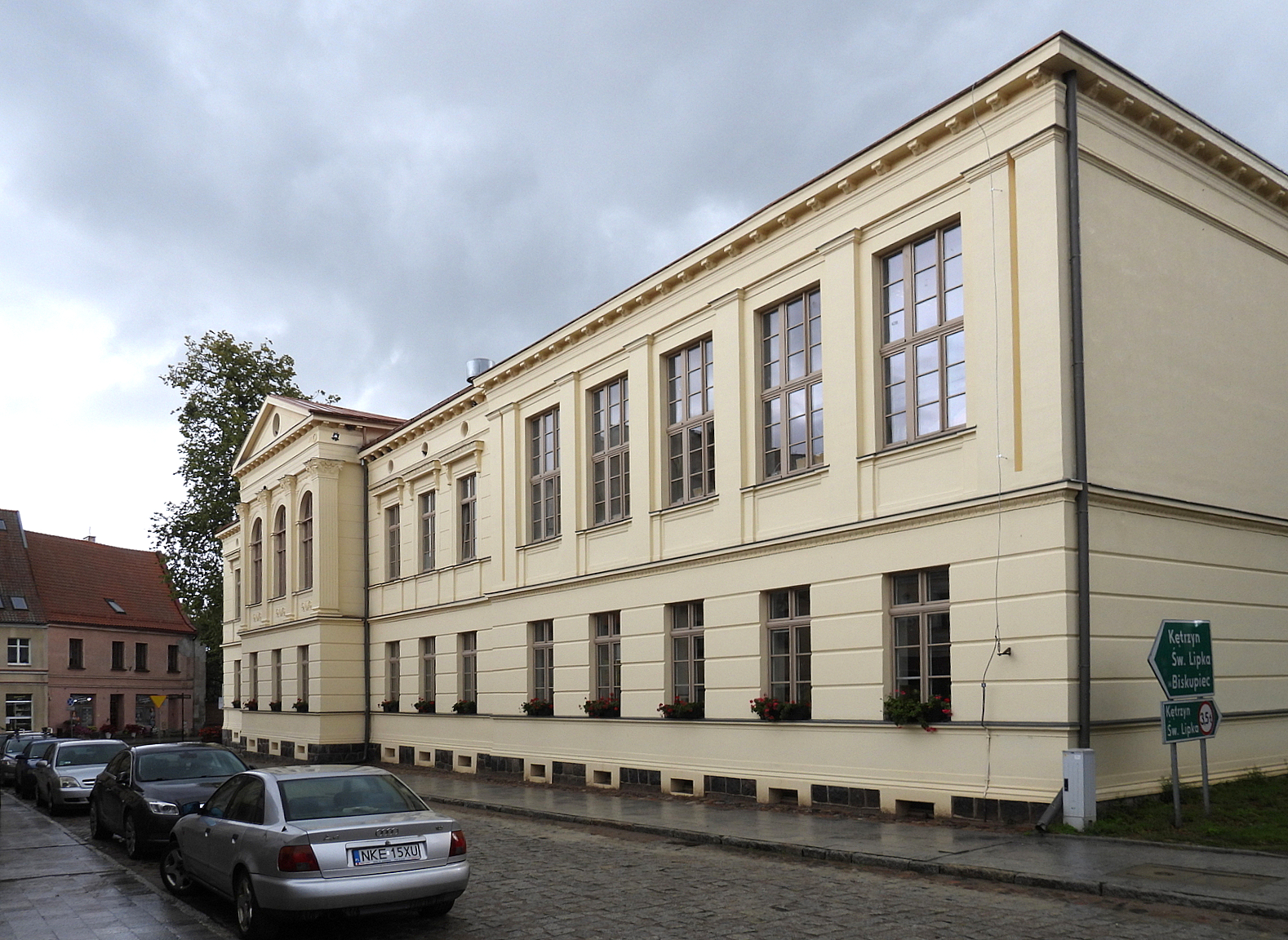
Former Jesuit College

== See also ==
- Rema S. A. headquarters
