= Oskar Daubmann =

Swiss-German conman

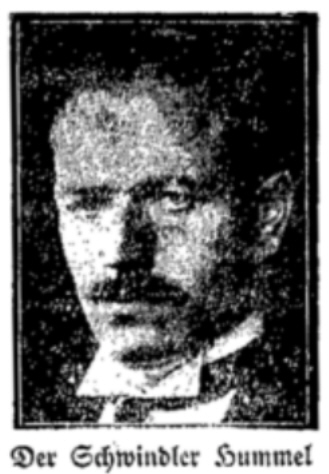
Oskar Daubmann (originally Ignaz Karl Hummel, January 17, 1933

Oskar Daubmann (originally Ignaz Karl Hummel; March 9, 1898 – January 20, 1954) was a Swiss-German con man whose case attracted international attention in 1932.

== Biography ==
Ignaz Karl Hummel was born in Oberwil, near Basel in Switzerland. He ran away from home at the age of eleven. After being arrested for thievery, he was assigned to a reform school. Afterward, he continued his career as a petty criminal, earning multiple convictions and prison sentences.

In 1930 he settled in Offenburg, working as a tailor. In 1931 he married Kreszentia Allgeier. In 1932, he left his pregnant wife for economic reasons (she filed for divorce the same year) and went to Algeria with the intention of enlisting in the French Foreign Legion. He had, however, stopped in Italy near Naples. Since he had no money for the return journey, he decided to call himself Oskar Daubmann, the name of a former school friend from Endingen am Kaiserstuhl, whom he knew had been missing since the First World War. According to another version of the story, he had been imprisoned for ten years for burglary, and shortly after his release had bought a second-hand uniform in a shop, in which pockets he found a soldier's passport in the name of Oscar Daubmann.

Hummel claimed to have been captured in 1916 at the Battle of Somme and that the French had imprisoned him for 16 years. After an escape attempt in 1917, he was allegedly accused of manslaughter and sentenced to 20 years imprisonment in an Algerian prison camp, to which he was transferred from a prisoner of war camp. In Algeria, he claimed to have been starved and tortured. Eventually, he was supposedly able to make his escape, and was picked up by an Italian ship after walking over 3,000 miles along the African coast. On 21 May 1932, Oskar Daubmann's parents received a letter from Italy, in which Hummel described his dramatic story and asked for assistance. They turned the letter over the local press, and the story quickly became known in German and international press.

At first, doubts about Daubmann's identity and history were largely ignored by the public, often dismissed as French lies and propaganda. The French were supposed to have released all German captives by 1930 and the case inflamed the French-German relations for a while. The alleged wrongful imprisonment of a German national quickly became a German and even international sensation, and Hummel - now Daubmann - found international recognition. The German press found in him a welcome opportunity for stirring up "national passions", inciting a hate campaign against France, which was accused of hypocrisy and cruelty. In particular, he became a popular figure in the Nazi press. Joseph Goebbels, writing in the Nazi magazine Der Angriff, demanded a war of vengeance. The supposed last prisoner of World War I was welcomed in a homecoming ceremony on 29 May attended by more than 15,000 people in his "hometown" of Endingen. Amazingly, the parents of the real Oskar Daubmann accepted the impostor as their son - despite his different eye color and lack of known facial scar.

Anton Bumiller, an officer from Sigmaringen who had served with the real Daubmann in the same regiment, nonetheless decided to exploit the situation. Bumiller organized lecture tours, and the "hero Daubmann" held numerous lectures in the following weeks and received numerous awards. He received the honorary citizenship of 18 towns and was elected as an honorary president of the Society of Ex-War-Prisoners. Bumiller would sell Daubmann merchandise and wrote an adventure novel based on his "real story", and inquires were made about a movie. In the meantime, the Daubmann issue became a Nazi propaganda story, contributing to Nazi victory in the federal election in July that year.

However, the French issued an official note casting a doubt on the story on 5 September 1932, in which they reported that after a detailed search of their archives, they failed to find any evidence to support his story. The Nazi press dismissed the French report, but other German authorities investigated the claims, due to growing inconsistencies in Daubmann's story, as many former colleagues had failed to recognize him. Eventually, police identified his fingerprints as those of Karl Ignaz Hummel. He was arrested on 11 October 1932. (According to a more sensational version, he was recognized and denounced by his own real father). The sensational turn provided ammunition to opponents of the Nazi Party. On 12 July 1933, the District Court of Freiburg found him guilty of serious forgery and fraud and sentenced him to two and a half years in prison. After serving his sentence, Nazi authorities exacted revenge for their past embarrassment, persecuting him once more, and from 1938 till 1945, when he was freed by the American forces, Hummel was in preventive detention in Schwäbisch Hall. Afterward, he remained in Schwäbisch Hall, remarrying in 1946 and working as a tailor until his death in 1954.

His story resurfaced in 1998, when archived German police material was made public.
