= Barbara Zdunk =

Polish alleged arsonist accused of witchcraft

- Born: Barbara Urban; 1769; Bartenstein, East Prussia, Kingdom of Prussia
- Died: August 21, 1811 (aged 41–42); Rößel, East Prussia, Kingdom of Prussia
- Era: Polish Enlightenment
- Known for: Last woman executed for witchcraft in Europe

Barbara Zdunk (1769 – 21 August 1811) was an ethnically Polish alleged arsonist accused of witchcraft. Zdunk lived in the town of Rößel, in what was then East Prussia and is now Reszel in Poland. She is considered by many to have been the last woman executed for witchcraft in Europe. Although the accusations of witchcraft were listed in her case, witchcraft was not a criminal offense in Prussia at the time.

== The case ==
In 1806, a devastating fire ravaged the town of Rößel, which burnt almost entirely to the ground. Zdunk, who was a maid known for her fondness of magic, was blamed. She was arrested in 1807, and imprisoned in Rößel castle. No evidence of substance was available, but she was still accused and found guilty of causing the fire. In 1811, Zdunk was executed by burning at the stake on a hill outside Rößel, though she was apparently strangled to death by the executioner before the fire was set.

It is believed today that a group of Polish soldiers were the actual arsonists. There is uncertainty as to the true reason for Zdunk's conviction, which was upheld by several appeal courts, up to the king himself. Revenge on Poland on the part of the Prussian authorities or a concession to an outraged public may have played a role, or that she was a 38-year-old woman who had a teenage boyfriend.

Similar to the execution of Anna Göldi in 1782, who is frequently claimed to be the last person to be executed for witchcraft in Europe, it is dubious whether the trial of Zdunk can be counted as a witch trial in a legal sense.

== See also ==
- Doruchów witch trial, likely the last larger witch trial in Poland
- Mary Bateman, a contemporary case of a similar execution
- Krystyna Ceynowa, a somewhat later case of an illegal witch trial in Poland
- Anna Göldi
- Anna Schnidenwind

== Source ==
- Neil Wilson, Tom Parkinson, Richard Watkins: Poland (Lonely Planet Publications)
