= Anna Schnidenwind =

Anna Schnidenwind (née Trutt; 1688 in Wyhl – 24 April 1751 in Endingen am Kaiserstuhl) was one of the last people in Germany and in Europe confirmed to have been executed in public for witchcraft.

It was for the devastating fire of Wyhl on 7 March 1751 which became the trigger of the witch trial. The fire destroyed most of the village. The 63-year-old peasant was accused of having caused arson through a Devil's pact.

Schnidenwind was judged guilty and sentenced to death. She was burned on 24 April 1751 in Endingen in Breisgau, after strangulation. The region was in those times part of Anterior Austria. It is quite sure, that the government in Vienna did not know about the case.

== See also ==
- Anna Göldi
- Barbara Zdunk
- Anna Maria Schwegelin

== Sources ==
- Anna Schnidenwind geborene Trutt (brochure), Endicott, (2001)
- Der Endinger Hexenprozess gegen Anna Trutt von 1751
