= Rema S. A. =

Polish machinery manufacturer

REMA S.A. (REMA Share Company) is a manufacturer of machines for processing wood and wood-based materials, located in Warsaw, Poland. The company produces circular sawing machines especially designed for sawing boards for the furniture industry. The company’s headquarters is in the town of Reszel (Warmińsko-mazurskie province).

== History ==
The enterprise was established in the middle of the 19th century as a foundry.

In the period between World Wars I and II, the company manufactured agricultural machines and devices. After the annexation of Northern Lands in 1945 to Poland, the company was one of the first industrial plants activated in the territory of what was then Olsztyn Province.

At first smithy begun to work in June 1945. In November 1945 the firm was taken over by the state-owned Northern Trust of Agricultural Machines in Gdańsk. Then, a new profile of production was opened: agricultural machines and machine tools for processing of peat.

The company accepted its new name: State Factory of Agricultural Machines. Three years later the factory was assigned to Management of Local Industry in Olsztyn and changed its name to "Mechanical Plant and Foundry". Production then began to diversify further. The company started producing builder's hoisting winches as well as machines and devices for the manufacture of litter peat. On January 1, 1975, the firm was taken over by the Management of Industrial Machinery for Forestry and changed its name to Reszel’s Plant of Industrial Machinery for Forestry (being still a part of the Trust structure).

In the period between 1953-62 the production program became extremely varied. Aside from a line of simple devices (wheeled sets, special benches, hoisting winches), there was also an assortment of high accuracy and precision products (air-compressors, tractors, hydraulic pumps, circular sawing machines).

Since 1963, after the Trust decided to distribute production of machine tools for wood over several factories in Poland, the company began to specialise in the production of circular sawing machines, shredders and fragmentisers for processing wood and wood-based materials.

From 1973 to 1985 the factory was intensively enlarged. A new foundry started production of cast iron. New productive halls were built and in 1983 a new division was opened in Bisztynek, producing farmer’s circular saws.

In December 1990 the enterprise was transformed into legal form of Share Company, owned solely by the Treasury of the State, and changed its name to REMA S.A. (REMA Share Company).

== Present activity ==
Rema services, repairs and sells spare parts for woodcutting machine tools. The primary line of products is the circular sawing machines with under-cutting spindle (scoring unit) for wood and chipboards. The company also produces cross-cutting circular saws, builder's circular saws, angular saws, radial arm saws, multi-blade rip saws, multi-functional machine tools and dust extractors. The foundry department produces cast iron: grey, nodular and alloy.
