= Anna Göldi =

Last European to be executed for witchcraft

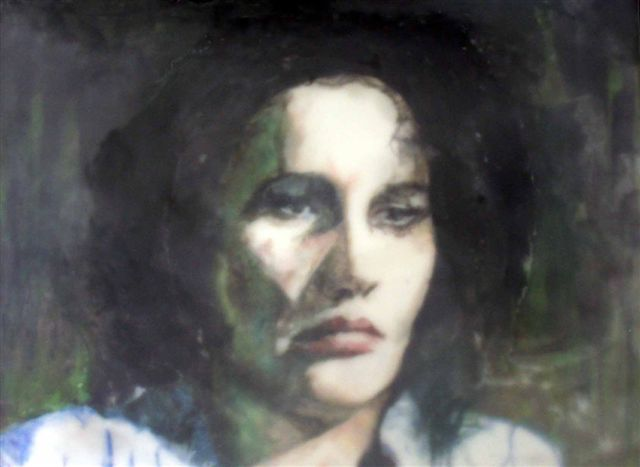
- Born: 24 October 1734; Sennwald, Switzerland
- Died: 13 June 1782 (aged 47); Glarus, Switzerland
- Cause of death: Decapitation
- Occupation: Housemaid

Anna Göldi (also Göldin or Goeldin, 24 October 1734 – 13 June 1782) was a Swiss housemaid who was one of the last persons to be executed for witchcraft in Europe. Göldi, who was executed by decapitation in Glarus, has been called the "last witch" in Switzerland. She was posthumously exonerated by the government of the canton of Glarus in 2008.

== Biography ==
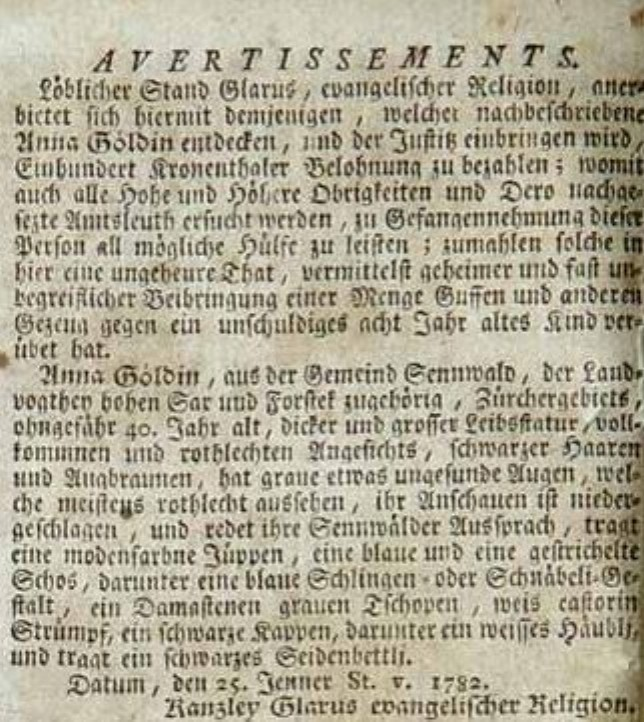
Advertisement of reward for Göldi's capture in the Zürcher Zeitung

Born in Sennwald as the fourth of eight children, Göldi started working as a domestic servant at aged 18. Between 1762 and 1765, she worked at the rectory of Sennwald. When she was 31, Göldi was impregnated by a mercenary, who left Switzerland before Göldi gave birth. Göldi's baby died the night it was born (something not uncommon due to the high infant mortality of the era). Under the accusation of murder of her own child, she was pilloried and sentenced to six years of house arrest. Göldi subsequently escaped and found employment with the Zwicky family in Mollis, where she worked from 1768 until 1775 or 1776. There, she had a son with Johann Melchior Zwicky, the son of her employer, though they were not married.

Göldi began working as a maid for the physician Johann Jacob Tschudi (1747-1800) in 1780 and looked after his five daughters. The master of the house is said to have had sexual desires for Anna. Anna Göldi filed a complaint against her employer for sexual harassment (and possibly rape) with the cantonal religious and judicial authorities, among whose officials was a member of the Tschudi family.

Following this, Jakob Tschudi reported her for having put needles in the bread and milk of one of his daughters, apparently through supernatural means. Göldi, at first, escaped arrest, but the authorities of the Canton of Glarus advertised a reward for her capture in the Zürcher Zeitung on 9 February 1782. Göldi was arrested and, under torture, admitted to entering in a pact with the Devil, who had appeared to her as a black dog. She withdrew her confession after the torture ended but was sentenced to execution by decapitation. The charges were officially of "poisoning" rather than witchcraft, even though the law at the time did not impose the death penalty for non-lethal poisoning.

During her trial, official allegations of witchcraft were avoided, and the court protocols were destroyed. The sentence does not, therefore, strictly qualify as that of a witch trial. Still, because of the apparent witchhunt that led to the sentence, the execution sparked outrage throughout Switzerland and the Holy Roman Empire.

The sentence was described at the time by historian August Ludwig von Schlözer as a judicial murder ("the murder of an innocent, deliberately, and with all the pomp of holy Justice".)

== Legacy ==
In 1982, Eveline Hasler published a novel about Anna Göldi, since translated into English as Anna Goeldin – The Last Witch. A Novel. In 1991, Gertrud Pinkus released a film based on Hasler's book.

=== Exoneration ===
On 20 September 2007, the Swiss parliament decided to acknowledge Anna Göldi's case as a miscarriage of justice. Fritz Schiesser, as the representative for Glarus in the Swiss parliament, called for Anna Göldi's exoneration, which was granted 226 years after her death, on 27 August 2008 on the grounds that she had been subjected to an "illegal trial".

Göldi's married employer abused his power after she had threatened to reveal their affair and the sexual crimes committed by him.

=== Memorial ===
The Swiss town of Glarus unveiled a memorial for Göldi in 2014. The memorial, consisting of two permanently lit lamps on the side of the Glarus court house, is intended to draw attention to violations of human rights that occur in the world today, as well as Göldi's story.

A plaque on the building's facade explains the lamps' significance. "The memorial is an expression of atonement for the injustice that took place here. It will be an eternal light for Anna Göldi."

On August 20, 2017, the Anna Göldi Museum was opened in the Hänggiturm building.

=== In popular culture ===
The life of Göldi has been the subject of a musical, with Göldi performed by Masha Karell.

Doom metal band 1782’s song “She Was a Witch” along with the band name were inspired by Anna Göldi

The short film, "Rebel Body" (2019) directed by Ohan Breiding and Shoghig Halajian, follows the story of Göldi's "illegal trial" and the consequences of hearsay.

== See also ==
- Anna Schnidenwind
- Anna Maria Schwegelin
- Barbara Zdunk

== Bibliography ==
- Hasler, E. (2013) Anna Goeldin -- The Last Witch. A Novel Trans. Mary Bryant. Ed. Waltraud Maierhofer. Lighthouse Christian Publishing. ISBN 1482659492
