= Endingen am Kaiserstuhl =

- Town
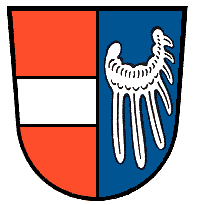
- Coat of arms

- Location of Endingen am Kaiserstuhl within Emmendingen district
- Interactive map of Endingen am Kaiserstuhl
- Location within Germany Location within Baden-Württemberg
- Coordinates: 48°8′27″N 7°42′23″E
- Country: Germany
- State: Baden-Württemberg
- Admin. region: Freiburg
- District: Emmendingen
- Subdivisions: 4

Government
  - Mayor (2018–26): Tobias Metz

Area
  - Total: 26.7 km^{2} (10.3 sq mi)
- Elevation: 186 m (610 ft)

Population (2025-12-31)
  - Total: 10,517
  - Density: 394/km^{2} (1,020/sq mi)
- Time zone: UTC+01:00 (CET)
  - Summer (DST): UTC+02:00 (CEST)
- Postal codes: 79346
- Dialling codes: 07642
- Vehicle registration: EM
- Website: www.endingen.de

Endingen am Kaiserstuhl (German pronunciation: [ˈɛndɪŋən ʔam ˈkaɪzɐʃtuːl], lit. 'Endingen on the Kaiserstuhl'; Low Alemannic: Ändinge am Kaiserstuehl) is a small German town located in southwest Germany, at the border with France. It lies at the northern border of a former volcano area called Kaiserstuhl. The population of Endingen is about 9,000.

== Geography ==
=== Geographic location ===
The town of Endingen with the winegrowing villages Amoltern, Kiechlinsbergen and Königschaffhausen is located in the north of the Kaiserstuhl. The highest point of the community is lying in the south of the city core, the Katharinenberg, on top of which stands a chapel. With 492.4 m above sea level it is the third highest peak of the Kaiserstuhl.

=== Climate ===
The city is located in one of the warmest areas of Germany, the Kaiserstuhl. The Mediterranean climate is reflected in the quality of the wines grown.

The climate in this area is close to a Mediterranean microclimate, and there is adequate rainfall year-round. However, more year-round rain occurs than in the Rhine plateau because of the closeness to the Black Forest. The Köppen Climate Classification subtype for this climate is "Cfb" (Marine West Coast Climate/Oceanic climate). However, it is close to being humid subtropical (Cfa) due to the mean temperatures in July and August just under 22 °C. The city is close to the Kaiserstuhl, a range of hills of volcanic origin located a few miles away which is considered to be one of the warmest places of Germany and therefore considered as a viticultural area.

Climate data for Endingen (Emmendingen-Mundingen) 2015-2020
Month	Jan	Feb	Mar	Apr	May	Jun	Jul	Aug	Sep	Oct	Nov	Dec	Year
Record high °C (°F)	15.9 (60.6)	20.3 (68.5)	24.0 (75.2)	29.5 (85.1)	33.3 (91.9)	37.1 (98.8)	37.7 (99.9)	38.5 (101.3)	32.3 (90.1)	28.1 (82.6)	23.8 (74.8)	18.0 (64.4)	38.5 (101.3)
Mean daily maximum °C (°F)	6.2 (43.2)	8.1 (46.6)	12.8 (55.0)	17.0 (62.6)	20.7 (69.3)	25.4 (77.7)	27.5 (81.5)	26.4 (79.5)	22.6 (72.7)	16.3 (61.3)	10.7 (51.3)	7.9 (46.2)	16.8 (62.2)
Daily mean °C (°F)	2.7 (36.9)	3.5 (38.3)	6.9 (44.4)	10.5 (50.9)	14.7 (58.5)	19.2 (66.6)	21.1 (70.0)	20.0 (68.0)	15.5 (59.9)	10.7 (51.3)	6.4 (43.5)	4.1 (39.4)	11.3 (52.3)
Mean daily minimum °C (°F)	−1.1 (30.0)	−0.4 (31.3)	1.3 (34.3)	3.7 (38.7)	8.4 (47.1)	12.9 (55.2)	13.8 (56.8)	13.0 (55.4)	9.2 (48.6)	5.6 (42.1)	2.1 (35.8)	0.3 (32.5)	5.8 (42.4)
Record low °C (°F)	−15.5 (4.1)	−12.1 (10.2)	−5.2 (22.6)	−3.3 (26.1)	1.7 (35.1)	5.9 (42.6)	5.7 (42.3)	5.7 (42.3)	0.6 (33.1)	−2.5 (27.5)	−6.9 (19.6)	−6.7 (19.9)	−6.8 (19.8)
Average precipitation mm (inches)	63 (2.5)	44 (1.7)	43 (1.7)	69 (2.7)	119 (4.7)	93 (3.7)	47 (1.9)	73 (2.9)	52 (2.0)	47 (1.9)	55 (2.2)	44 (1.7)	749 (29.5)
Average precipitation days (≥ 0.2 mm)	14.9	13.4	16.0	13.0	15.1	12.3	15.1	14.8	11.7	15.7	16.7	15.3	173.9
Average rainy days (≥ 0.2 mm)	13	10	15	14	17	16	12	13	11	14	14	14	163
Average snowy days (≥ 0.2 cm)	3.4	0.8	0.4	0.2	0	0	0	0	0	0	0.4	3.0	8.2
Mean monthly sunshine hours	71.7	96.3	136.3	167.5	199.5	249.6	238.9	219.9	165.9	117.3	70.6	60.3	1,793.8
Source 1: Weather-Online
Source 2: Weather-Online

=== Neighbouring municipalities ===
Neighboring communities are (clockwise from the west): Sasbach, Wyhl, Forchheim, Riegel, Bahlingen, Vogtsburg.

=== City structure ===
In addition to the town of Endingen itself, the three districts Amoltern, Kiechlinsbergen and Königschaffhausen belong to Endingen. At the same time, these form localities within the meaning of the Baden-Württemberg municipal code with their own town councils and mayors. In each of the localities administration offices are set up with the name "Ortschaftsamt". The official designation of the districts is preceded by the name of the city and connected by hyphen adjusted the names of the neighborhoods. The neighborhoods are spatially identical to the former municipalities of the same name. The urban area is also divided into the four residential districts within the meaning of the Baden-Württemberg municipal code. These are residential district I (Endingen), residential district II (Amoltern), residential district III (Kiechlinsbergen) and residential district IV (Königschaffhausen). The districts each include only the villages of the same name.

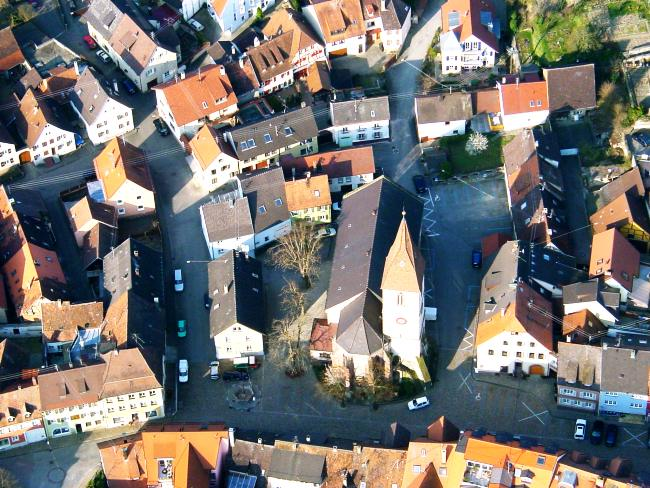
Endingen

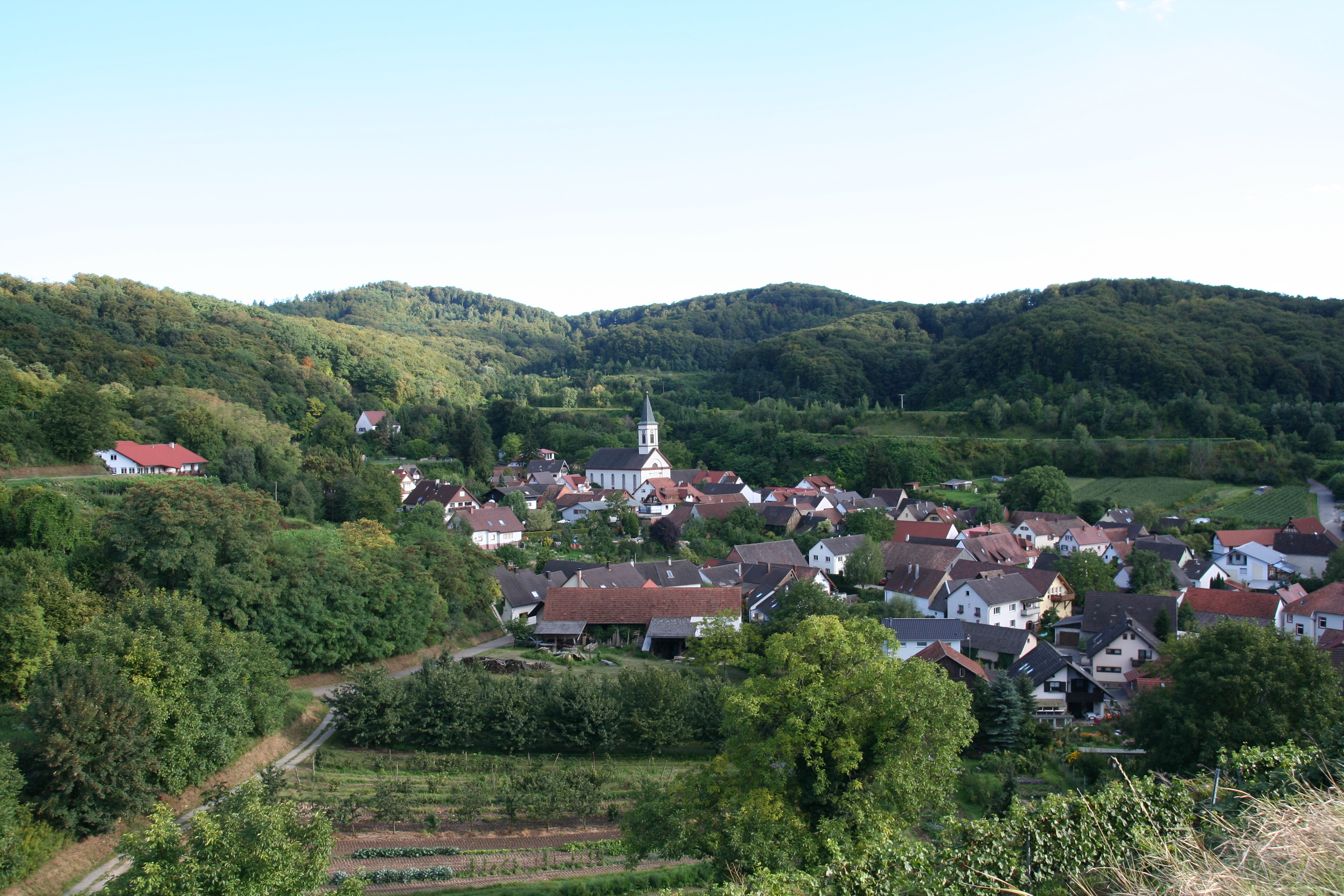
Amoltern

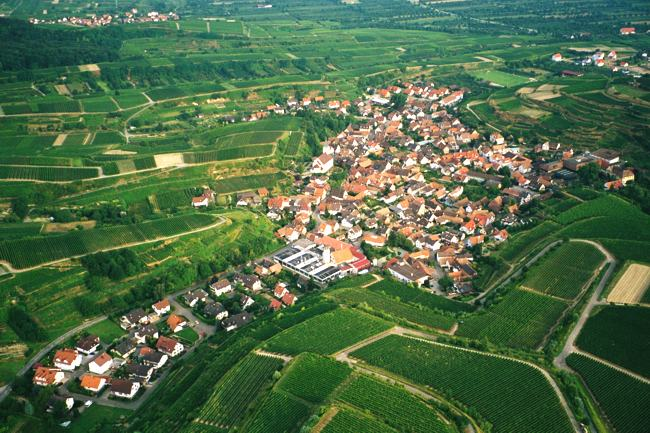
Kiechlinsbergen

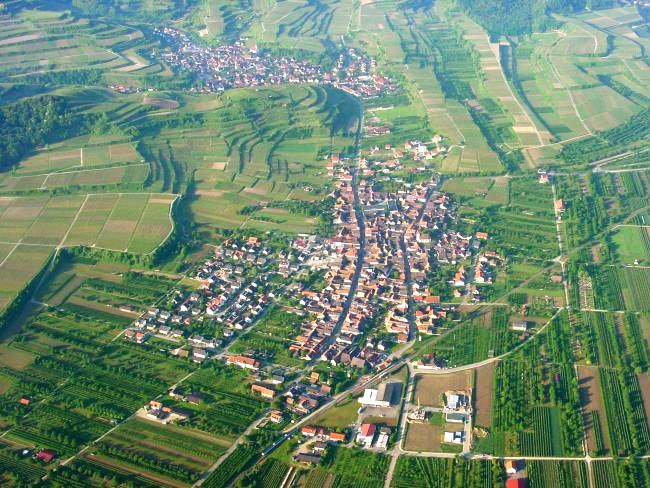
Königschaffhausen

== History ==
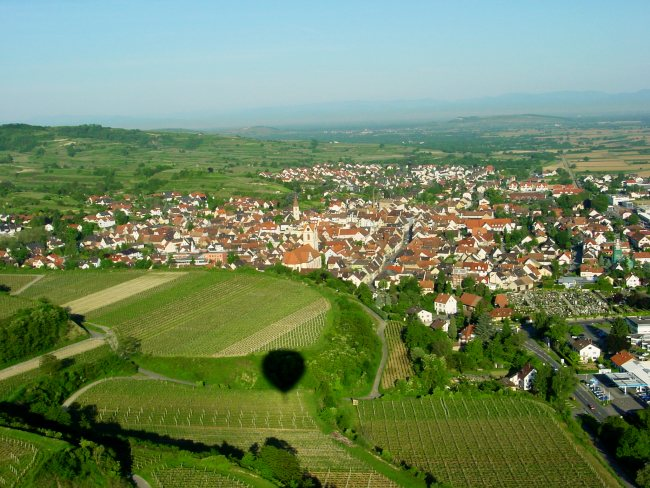
Aerial view of Endingen

Endingen is first found in sources in the year 862. It belonged to the Lords of Endingen for several centuries and then to the Lords of Üsenberg. In 1285 or 1286, Endingen received city rights. When the Lords of Üsenberg died out in 1379, the town passed to the Habsburgs and was eventually incorporated into Vorderösterreich. For a short time in the 15th century, Endingen held the status of an Imperial City (Reichsstadt) of the Holy Roman Empire.

In 1751, Endingen was the site of one of the last Witch Trials in Europe. On 24 April Anna Schnidenwind was burned as a witch. After the Peace of Pressburg (1805), Endingen was assigned with the rest of the Breisgau to Baden. At the same time, Endingen also became part of the Landkreis Emmendingen. The exception is Kiechlinsbergen, which belonged to the former administrative district of Freiburg before its incorporation.

In 1843, 358 citizens emigrated from the Kaiserstuhl area via Le Havre to Colonia Tovar, Venezuela, mainly from Endingen am Kaiserstuhl, Forchheim, Wyhl and Oberbergen. There they were settled after some turmoil at their present location. The farmers planted vegetables and fruits and also brewed Venezuela's first beer; they built their houses in half-timbered style.

=== Incorporations ===
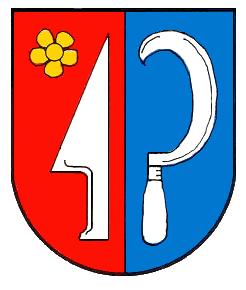
Amoltern

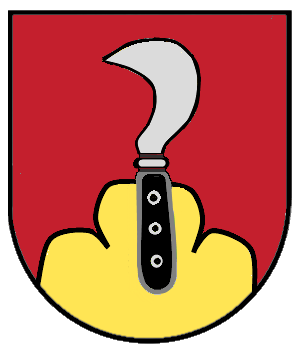
Kiechlinsbergen

Königschaffhausen
- December 1, 1971: Amoltern
- January 1, 1974: Kiechlinsbergen (1150th Anniversary in 2012)
- January 1, 1975: Königschaffhausen

== Sites of interest ==
- Kaiserstühler Heimatmuseum
- Cheese museum Endingen
- Further Austria museum

== Economy and infrastructure ==
=== Economy ===
Viticulture plays, as everywhere in the Kaiserstuhl, a prominent role. There is a wine cooperative in every town and in the city center. Furthermore, several independent wineries are located in the community. Königschaffhausen is especially known for its cherry cultivation. Several industrial and retail companies are located in Endingen.

=== Education ===
For preschoolers there are three kindergartens in the city center (Regenbogen, St. Elisabeth and Maria Quell) and in the winegrower villages one kindergarten each. The Endinger school center comprises an elementary school, the classes 5 to 7 of the Werkrealschule "Nördlicher Kaiserstuhl" (Werkrealschule together with the municipality Wyhl) as well as the Stefan Zweig- secondary school . The Maria Sibylla Merian Primary School in Kiechlinsbergen and Königschaffhausen welcomes elementary school students from the villages of Kiechlinsbergen and Königschaffhausen. There is also a primary school class. In addition, there is the Albert Schweitzer-Förderschule, which cares for pupils with learning difficulties and whose education has been extended since the year 2005 to full-time school.

=== Courts ===
The city Endingen belongs to the jurisdiction of the District Court Kenzingen.

=== Transport ===
Endingen is located south of the state road L113. The city is 5 km away from the A5 Frankfurt am Main - Basel motorway. Its train station lies at the Kaiserstuhl Railway. Direct trains leave to Riegel-Malterdingen (with connection to the Rhine Valley Railway), Breisach, and Gottenheim (both with connection to the Freiburg–Breisach railway. The nearest airport is the EuroAirport Basel-Mulhouse-Freiburg, about 70 km south of Endingen.

== Town twinnings ==
- Erstein, France
- Colonia Tovar, Venezuela

Since 1970, Endingen is twinned with the Alsatian town of Erstein in France, only about 30 kilometers down on the other side of the Rhine. The municipality of Colonia Tovar in Venezuela, which was partly co-founded by emigrants from Endingen, also maintains a twinning. There are also friendly relations with the French commune of Coulonges-sur-l'Autize in the Nouvelle-Aquitaine region of western France.

== People ==
=== Born in Endingen am Kaiserstuhl ===
- Joseph Biechele - creator of Biechele Soap brand
- Augustin Tünger (1455-not after 1510) - author of the first German collection of Facetiae.
- Anton Benitz (1803-1858) - Founded Benitz Brewery, Pittsburgh, PA USA - later known as the Iron City Brewery, still in operation today as the Pittsburgh Brewing Company.

=== Related to Endingen am Kaiserstuhl ===
- Oskar Daubmann (1898-1954)
- Anna Schnidenwind (1688-1751)
