= Wyhl =

- Municipality
- Coat of arms

- Location of Wyhl within Emmendingen district
- Interactive map of Wyhl
- Location within Germany Location within Baden-Württemberg
- Coordinates: 48°9′56″N 7°38′56″E
- Country: Germany
- State: Baden-Württemberg
- Admin. region: Freiburg
- District: Emmendingen

Government
  - Mayor (2016–24): Ferdinand Burger

Area
  - Total: 16.95 km^{2} (6.54 sq mi)
- Elevation: 175 m (574 ft)

Population (2025-12-31)
  - Total: 4,051
  - Density: 239.0/km^{2} (619.0/sq mi)
- Time zone: UTC+01:00 (CET)
  - Summer (DST): UTC+02:00 (CEST)
- Postal codes: 79369
- Dialling codes: 07642
- Vehicle registration: EM
- Website: www.wyhl.de

Wyhl, officially Wyhl am Kaiserstuhl (German pronunciation: [ˈviːl ʔam ˈkaɪzɐʃtuːl]; lit. 'Wyhl on the Kaiserstuhl'), is a municipality in the district of Emmendingen in Baden-Württemberg in southwestern Germany.

== Resistance to Wyhl Nuclear Power Plant construction ==
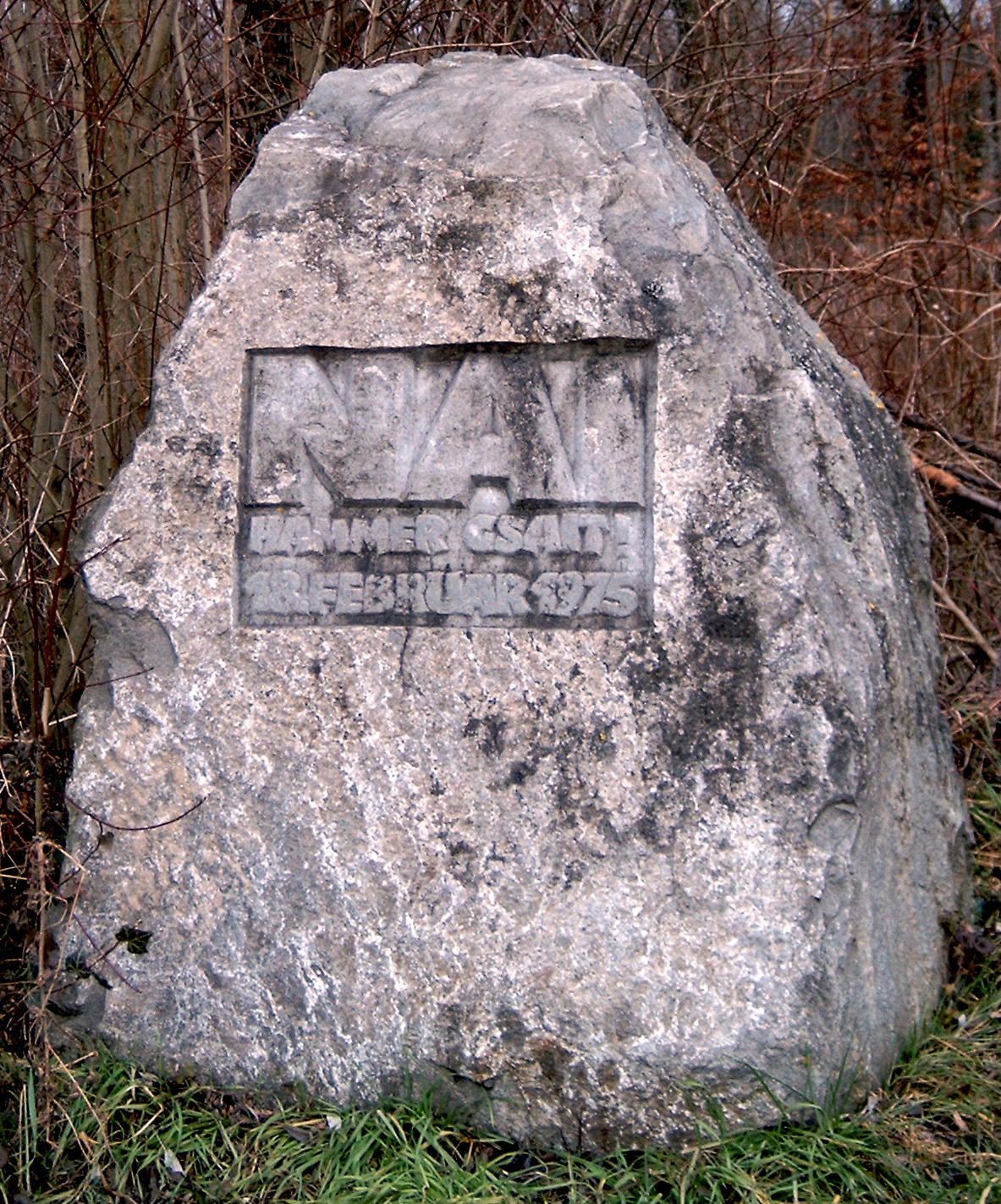
Monument "No we said! 18 February 1975"

It is known in the 1970s for its role in the anti-nuclear movement. Wyhl was first mentioned in 1971 as a possible site for a nuclear power station, the Wyhl Nuclear Power Plant. In the years that followed, local opposition steadily mounted, but this had little impact on politicians and planners. Official permission for the plant was granted and earthworks began on 17 February 1975. On 18 February, local people spontaneously occupied the site and police removed them forcibly two days later. Television coverage of police dragging away farmers and their wives through the mud helped to turn nuclear power into a major national issue. The rough treatment was widely condemned and made the wine-growers, clergy, and others all the more determined. Some local police refused to take part in the action.

Subsequent support came from the nearby university town of Freiburg. On 23 February about 30,000 people re-occupied the Wyhl site and plans to remove them were abandoned by the state government in view of the large number involved and potential for more adverse publicity. On 21 March 1975, an administrative court withdrew the construction licence for the plant. The plant was never built and the land eventually became a nature reserve.

The Wyhl occupation generated extensive national debate. This initially centred on the state government's handling of the affair and associated police behaviour, but interest in nuclear issues was also stimulated. The Wyhl experience encouraged the formation of citizen action groups near other planned nuclear sites. Many other anti-nuclear groups formed elsewhere, in support of these local struggles, and some existing citizens' action groups widened their aims to include the nuclear issue. This is how the German anti-nuclear movement evolved. Therefore, Wyhl is often referred to as the first great success of the German Anti-nuclear power Movement with an announcement effect for other similar conflicts like Brokdorf, nuclear reprocessing plant Wackersdorf or Gorleben. Anti-nuclear success at Wyhl also inspired nuclear opposition in the rest of Europe and North America.

== See also ==
- Anti-nuclear movement in Germany
- Rolf Disch
- Michael Sladek
