= 2017 hair and braid chopping incidents in India =

Mysterious hair chopping incidents in India
- Status: Ended
- Genre: Mystery, rumours, human or animal activities
- Begins: June 2017
- Ends: October 2017
- Frequency: Weekly, alternately, monthly
- Country: India
- Major events: Braid chopping

Numerous unexplained and mysterious hair and braid chopping incidents were being reported across India between June and October 2017. The first widely reported incident was on 23 June 2017, when ABP News reported a woman from Bikaner District, Rajasthan, had her hair chopped allegedly by a 'witch' (dayan) while she was asleep at night. Similar incidents were also reported throughout India, particularly in the northern states of Delhi, Bihar, Haryana, Uttarakhand, Uttar Pradesh and Jammu and Kashmir.

== India ==
=== Rajasthan ===
On 23 June 2017 ABP News reported a woman from Bikaner District, Rajasthan had her hair chopped by a 'witch' as she slept. Additional hair-chopping incidents followed, and fears of an epidemic – particularly in Rajasthan – soared. Incidents occurred not only at night but also during the day.

Three days before the 23 June event, a similar incident was reported in Pipar City, Jodhpur District, where a girl's hair had been found cut when she awoke in the morning. This news was first reported by Dainik Bhaskar. Along with the missing hair, the girl displayed injuries on other parts of her body.^{[which parts?please tell]} When police investigated, they found that the girl's hair had been cut by a blade. However, they were unable to find the culprit.

On 6 July 2017, the Hindustan Times reported that two girls from Rajasthan, aged 13 and 14 years old, and both unknown to each other, were victims of additional hair incidents.

On 8 July 2017, the BBC reported that many western municipalities including Bikaner, Nagaur, Jaisalmer, Barmer, Jodhpur, and Jalore districts had been affected by these incidents.

=== Uttar Pradesh ===
In early August 2017, two cases were reported from Aligarh and Moradabad districts. Four cases were reported in Bulandshahr district. But later Uttar Pradesh Police and Delhi Police clarified that the incidents were only rumours. According to The Indian Express news channel, around thirty cases were filed all over north India.

On 2 August, a 62-year-old woman was killed by angry villagers in Agra district for being accused as a "witch" who cut the braids of girls. NDTV India reported this news on 3 August 2017. UP police filed murder cases on two suspects who fled the city and were neighbors of the victim.

=== Delhi ===
On 1 August 2017, three women, unknown to each other and aged between 50 and 60, from Kangan Heri complained about being the victims of hair-chopping incidents on the same day. None of the women had seen their perpetrator, but when they fell unconscious and later woke up, they found their hair chopped.

=== Haryana ===
Fifteen cases were reported in Haryana state. The women who were victims of these types of incidents said that they had witnessed "godmen", "witches", "ghosts" and "cat-like creatures". The police rejected these claims.

One such incident happened in Gurgaon on 28 July, when a 60-year-old woman found her braid chopped when she awoke on the floor. She made claims that a thin man came to her doorsteps with a trident in his hand. She claims she asked him to leave, but he reappeared, which led her to fall unconscious. The police filed the case and entered it in the Daily Diary.

=== Jammu and Kashmir ===
There have been more than 200 incidents of women being attacked and often knocked unconscious by men in balaclavas, who then chop off their traditional hair braids. Officers had no solid leads or suspects, and Jammu and Kashmir Police (JKP) had to respond to a surge of revenge attacks by vigilantes armed with knives, cricket bats, and iron rods.

The initial police response to the braid attacks, which mainly occurred inside people's homes, was to suggest the victims were suffering from hallucinations. This drew criticism from the government-run Women's Commission, and they began serious investigations but no arrests have been made.

Tasleema Bilal, a 40-year-old woman whose hair was cut off in September 2018 while she was in her home in Srinagar, the region's main city, said that she tried to remove the attacker's mask before escaping, leaving her hair behind. Other women have said that they were knocked unconscious with a mysterious chemical spray that authorities have yet to identify.

Kashmiris have alleged the attacks are the "handiwork of Indian agencies" trying to intimidate the portion of Kashmir's population that opposes Indian rule. Residents are also suspicious of the Indian authorities, and some have accused soldiers and police of staging the attacks or protecting those responsible. In many incidents, the police and Indian Army appeared to aid the braid choppers in escaping by taking and saving them from public vigilantes.

On 22 October 2017, Arab News, a Saudi Arabian news agency, reported that around 100 women in Kashmir have been victims of hair-chopping incidents.

== Religious responses ==
=== Hinduism ===
In the 23 June case, the victim's legs and hands had a Trishula (Trident) mark, linking the incident to Hinduism. However, no Hindu religious leaders have responded to this detail.

=== Islam ===
Some Indian Muslims have also been victims of these types of incidents. Some Islamic scholars stated that these incidents are being executed by mischievous elements in society.

== Change in the rumor ==
On 19 August, a report from Dainik Bhaskar changed the discussion surrounding these events. The report clearly proved that there was no such evidence of a witch or a ghost being responsible. In this report, a man from Gwalior, Madhya Pradesh caught an insect which was later suspected to be a dermestidae, drugstore beetle, rain beetle or varied carpet beetle. This insect is believed to feed on keratin found in hair and nails.

A similar case occurred on 9 August, when in Moradabad district a man killed a honey badger accused of eating or chopping women's hair, but due to lack of evidence, this report faced negligence.

On 17 August, a report from Manpur, Bhopal district, Madhya Pradesh had several eyewitnesses. The incident happened around 4 pm as the victim was sitting outside her house. She suddenly felt that her hair was being cut off. Her screaming brought the attention of her grandmother, who saw that her hair was being cut off, but she did not see anyone do it. Her grandmother quickly caught her fallen hair and the cutting stopped. Later the grandmother discovered an unusual detail. She noticed that as she picked up and held the hair, the rest of her granddaughter's hair was sheared, except for the exact number of hairs she held.

== See also ==
- Witch-hunts in India
