= Witch hunts in India =

Persecution of accused witches in modern-day India

Witch hunts are still prevalent in India in the twenty-first century. Those who are labelled as witches are usually elderly or single women accused of manipulating supernatural forces with malicious intent. Witch branding occurs predominantly in rural, poorer areas of the country where there is often a higher concentration of tribal communities.

Multiple factors can lead to a witchcraft accusation, ranging from crop failure, financial hardship, and the loss of livestock to the illness or death of family members. Accusations are often instigated to serve ulterior motives like grabbing the land and property of a 'witch', settling personal grudges or even as a punishment for turning down sexual advances. There are also deeper underlying causes of witch hunting, primarily a lack of education and basic social benefits, particularly healthcare.

The vast majority of witch-hunting victims are women, especially older, single women of a lower caste, who because of their background are socially marginalised and are thus more vulnerable to becoming scapegoats for the misfortunes of their neighbours. Whilst not as common, men can be subjected to witchcraft accusations especially if they are relatives or family members of an accused witch.

According to the National Crime Records Bureau (NCRB) of India, from 2000 to 2016, over 2,500 people had been killed in witch hunts, overwhelmingly women. This number is estimated to be even higher, as many cases go unreported. Women accused of practising witchcraft face various forms of physical and mental torture as well as execution. Severe violence is commonly used to punish accused witches and can include rape, beating, flogging and severing of limbs. Furthermore, 'witches' can be mentally and emotionally abused through ostracism, banishment, hounding and public humiliation.

== History ==
Witch-hunting in India is an ancient practice spanning back many centuries with references to dayans (witches) being found in several early Sanskrit works. However, unlike the witch trials in Early Modern Europe and Colonial America, where victims were tried and recorded by state-run judiciaries, though all were miscarriages of justice, detailed records of witch hunts in India are difficult to find as many hunts were mob-instigated, unofficial incidents that were publicly tried. For this reason, there is no concrete documented evidence of witch-hunting in India before the Santhal witch trials of 1792 and the majority of witch-hunting cases are found in information from the colonial period.

=== Witch hunting in colonial India ===
In 19th-century Colonial India, many cases of witch hunting were recorded and officials speculated that during this period over a thousand women were killed on the grounds of witchcraft in India's central plains alone. It was also believed that more women were killed as witches than those who died through the practice of Sati. Witches (also known as dakinis or dayans), were usually identified by male practitioners of magic and spiritual leaders. These witch hunters known as 'bohpas', 'bahgats' and other names, were consulted after members of the community, their relatives or the leaders of villages complained of suffering misfortunes caused by witchcraft. Once a 'witch' was identified, bohpas would attempt to 'free' the victim from her power, by using magic, exorcism, torture and execution. For example, a popular method of torture in Western India was 'witch-swinging', where an accused witch would have chilli paste rubbed into her eyes, was hung upside-down from a tree and swung over an open fire until she confessed to her crimes or promised to release her victim(s). In one case in 1886 an elderly woman called Kunkoo was accused of inflicting illness on a soldier's wife, she was made to put her hands in boiling oil and swung for days before being released and eventually murdered.

==== Bans on witch-hunting ====
British authorities implemented several bans on witch-killing between the 1840s and 60s throughout Eastern India. The bans targeted spiritual leaders and holy men who named and accused witches in their villages. In serious cases punishments for hunters could even lead to a death sentence.

Initially, the bans seemed to be effective and were living up to their aim of reducing the number of witch hunts. Women accused of witchcraft and their families were given more resources and opportunities to seek support, compensation and justice. Bhopas were also dissuaded from labelling certain women as witches and carrying out more brutal forms of punishment on the accused. However, hunts continued regardless of new laws, in more inconspicuous and less violent forms. The British failed to acknowledge how deeply embedded witchcraft beliefs were in tribal societies and instead of stopping witch hunts the bans drove the practice underground. It did not help that many colonial officials, attempting to ease tensions and accommodate local traditions, were known to accept certain witch-hunting practices and were lenient towards perpetrators with some even attending witch-swingings.

It is possible that the outlawing of witch-hunting inflamed the number of hunts, due to the hostile and resistant response legislation was met with. Firstly, many Indians opposed the trials of witch-killers, who were often influential men that played central roles in village life and, in the views of locals, were only trying to protect their communities from evil supernatural forces. Additionally, after the passing of witch-hunting bans, reasons to hunt 'dayans' expanded beyond land-grabbing and a way of gaining retribution for misfortunes and arguably transitioned into a form of resisting colonialist rule. For instance, witches became a symbol of colonial power and who many believed had been 'protected' by new British laws, therefore the practice of witch-hunting became an indirect form of expressing hostility towards colonial power.

==== 1855 Santhal Rebellion and 1857 Indian Rebellion ====
Indian Rebellion 1857

Mass incidents of witch-hunting often coincided with major rebellions in British India, further supporting the notion that witch-hunts represented a mode of resistance against colonial rule. For example, in the 1855 Santhal Rebellion, large numbers of women were persecuted by Santhal leaders in the form of witchcraft accusations, despite playing active roles in the resistance.

Similarly, in 1857 during the Indian Rebellion, a wave of witch hunts broke out across the region of Chota Nagpur. The rebellion provided an opportunity for rebel leaders to 'clean out' witches, whose numbers many suspected had risen under the 'benevolent power' of the British, leading to a surge in hunts across rebel-controlled regions. Witches in many ways came to symbolise British power and for this reason were killed by rebel leaders as a way of consolidating their religious and political power over the masses in times of major upheaval.

== Modern witch hunts ==
In modern-day India, witch-hunting continues to be prevalent and customary in isolated and deprived rural areas, particularly in the Northern and central parts of the country. The state of Jharkhand has recorded the highest total number of murders where the motive was witchcraft, with 593 women being killed on the grounds of witchcraft between 2001 and 2021 according to the National Crime Records Bureau (NCRB). The states of Assam, Bihar, Chhattisgarh, Madhya Pradesh and Odisha also have recorded many cases of witch branding. There are usually three stages to a witch hunt: accusation, declaration and persecution. A witchcraft accusation is most commonly triggered after the sudden death or illness of a family member, crop failure or loss of livestock. A woman is then declared a witch by a socially recognised sorcerer, who is consulted by community members after suffering misfortune. These sorcerers perform magic to identify a witch and to punish her for practising black magic.

Murders with Witchcraft as their Motive by Year
Year	Murders
2000	126
2001	126
2002	151
2003	138
2004	111
2005	197
2006	186
2007	177
2008	175
2009	175
2010	178
2011	240
2012	119
2013	160
2014	156
2015	135
2016	134
2017	73
2018	62
2019	102
2020	88
2021	68
Total	3077

=== Persecution ===
Since the early 2000s reported cases of witch-hunting have shown that women accused of practising black magic have been subjected to persecution and inhumane treatment from those living in their village. This is done in an attempt to punish the witch or 'purify' her. Victims can be badly beaten or flogged by perpetrators and sexually assaulted, some are forced to endure even more violent forms of torture such as having limbs chopped off. In more serious cases accused witches are killed, and some methods of execution still used today in hunts include being burned alive and stoned. Many deaths can also happen as a result of injuries caused by physical violence. Witch-hunting victims face mental torture as well as physical attacks, this ranges from verbal abuse and harassment to public humiliation. For example, in 2009 five women from a remote village in Jharkhand's Deoghar district were paraded naked, beaten and forced to eat human faeces. In many cases, women have to flee their homes in fear of persecution or are banished from their villages and forced off their property. The effects of attacks and so-called 'punishments' often leave a lasting impact on victims of witch branding, leading some to commit suicide.

=== Causal factors ===
==== Lack of quality education and healthcare provision ====
The majority of witch-hunting cases in India are recorded from places and communities in poor socio-economic conditions. For example, in Jharkhand, a state where witch branding is highly prevalent, nearly 40% of the population lives below the poverty line. This combined with inadequate healthcare provision and education helps to create an environment where witch-hunting can thrive.

A lack of hygiene and easily accessible medical facilities means that in many poorer areas, treatable minor illnesses are common causes of death. Hospitals and other medical facilities are often too far from rural Indian communities and instead, many Indians in isolated areas seek the help of a local deity or priest for medical ailments. This is a key causal factor of witch hunts as disease outbreaks and seemingly unexplainable deaths are viewed in these communities as the result of witchcraft or black magic. The significance of poor access to healthcare on witch-hunting can be seen in a 2019 joint study by The Uttarakhand State Commission for Women and Action Aid Commission, which found that 27% of recorded witch-hunting cases in the state of Uttarakhand were triggered in response to children developing health issues and another 43.5% were instigated due to the ill health of adults. The poor standard of education in states like Jharkhand also increases the likelihood that people will turn to irrational superstitious beliefs, like witchcraft, to explain sudden deaths, illnesses or crop failure in their communities.

==== Ulterior motives of accusers ====
Witch hunts are often a common ploy to grab land and property from women, a motive which is usually hidden under the guise of superstition. This is because coveted land and resources owned by single, usually widowed and childless women are more easily acquired after witch hunts by jealous neighbours and family members. For instance, a labelled 'witch' can have her right to own property denied. She may be forced off her land in fear of being attacked, by being banished from her village, or killed.

Settling personal grudges and disputes can take the form of a witch hunt. Outspoken, naturally assertive and more confrontational women are more likely to be targeted and labelled as a witch as a way of silencing them or acting on a long-term grudge against them. There have been instances where the refusal of a woman to accept sexual advances has led to her being branded a witch, making it far easier for perpetrators to isolate the woman from her village and take sexual advantage of her.

Some feminist academics have argued that an underlying desire to subordinate women who pose a threat to the patriarchal structure of rural Indian societies is a key factor in the existence of modern-day witch-hunting. Tanvi Yadav, for example, argues that brutal methods of physical and mental punishment for accused witches, such as beating, naked parading and lynching are used to intentionally terrorize and silence women who otherwise may have challenged or spoken out against patriarchal norms. Sikha Das also notes that young, independent and strongly-willed widows are more likely to be branded a witch as a way of punishing them for stepping outside of traditional expectations for women of their status.

== Efforts to end witch-hunting ==
Attempts to create legislation to prevent and eliminate the practice of witch-hunting have been made at national and state levels. For example, in 2001 Jharkhand enacted The Prevention of Witch (Daain) Practices Act to "eliminate" the "torture, humiliation and killing by the (sic) society". Additionally, the law criminalises rituals performed by witch doctors who are believed to identify and 'cure' witches. In 2021 the state government launched Project Garima which aims to curb witch-hunting by "empowering" victims by providing them with counselling, job skills training and livelihood opportunities. The project also has the goal of spreading awareness among vulnerable communities in order to prevent witch-hunts. Currently 6 states in the country have specific laws targeting witch hunting including Rajasthan, Jharkhand, Chhattisgarh, Bihar, Odisha, and Assam, meanwhile Maharashtra and Karnataka have legislation broadly covering witch-hunting along with other superstitions.

However, the overall effectiveness of anti-witch-hunting legislation has been called into question. Firstly, the majority of laws enacted to combat witch-hunting have only been made at a state level and the Central Government of India has yet to pass a specific piece of legislation relating to the practice. One of the only attempts to stop this crime at a federal level has been the introduction of The Prevention of Witch-Hunting Bill by Raghav Lakhanpal to Parliament in 2016, however, as of now the bill is still pending.

The implementation of these laws is also poor, as only 2 percent of perpetrators are convicted. Cases that are reported are likely to be dismissed due to a lack of proper investigation, witnesses or because of a 'compromise' reached between victim and perpetrator. Furthermore, most cases are not documented as it is difficult for poor and illiterate women to travel from isolated regions to file police reports. For these reasons, campaigners have argued for social solutions which target superstition and irrationality in communities, support victims and address the roots of the problem, rather than taking a strictly legal approach to eliminate witch-hunting.

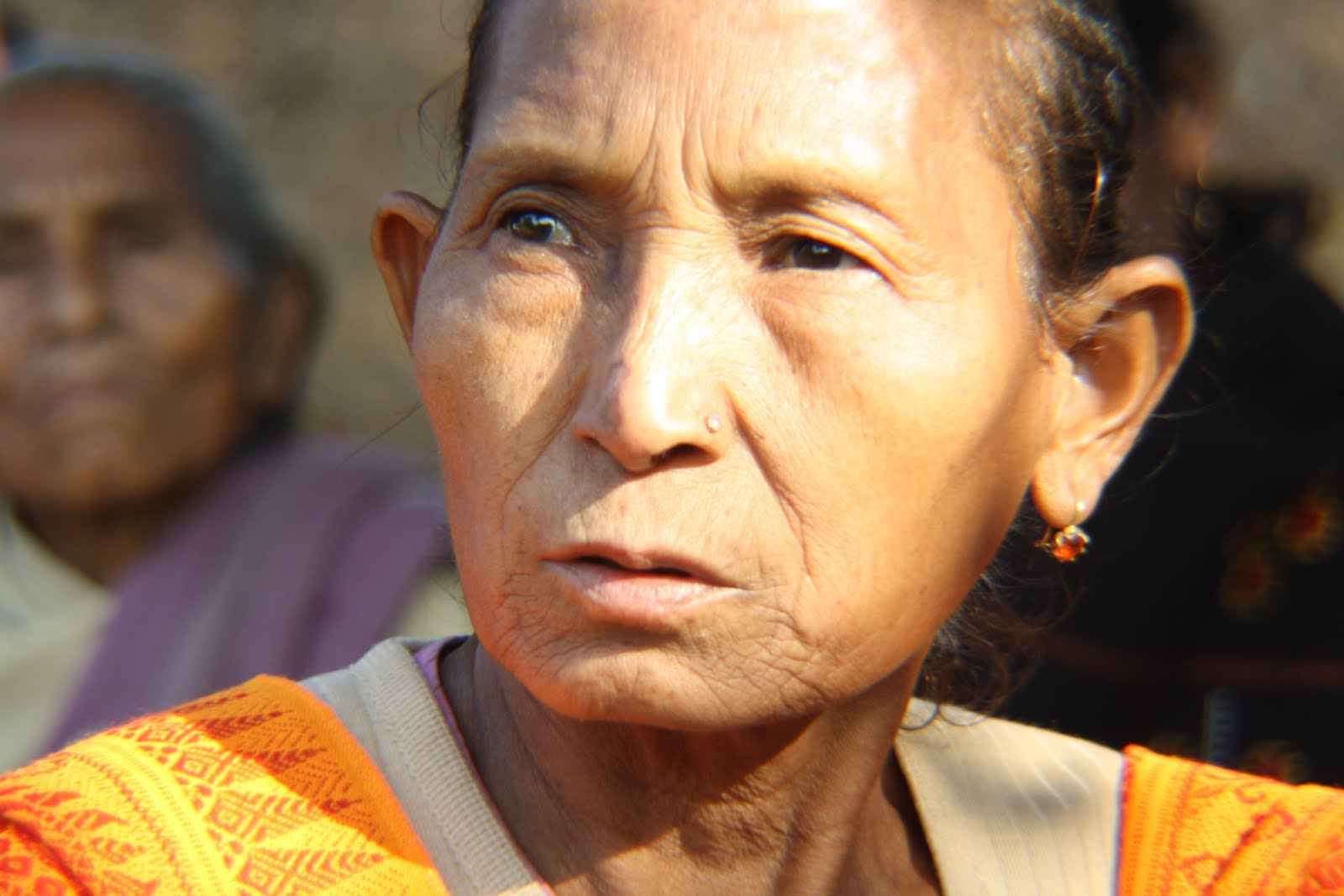
Birubala Rabha

Non-governmental organisations like the Centre for Social Justice (CSJ) use the legal system to fight for the rights and assets of women and marginalized people, who are attacked in witch hunts. Another organisation, ANANDI, builds solidarity among victims of witch hunts or those who live in areas where women are frequently targeted. Individual activists have also had a significant impact on the fight against witch-hunting. For example, Birubala Rabha, who runs an organisation which spreads awareness against witch-hunting called [Mission Birubala, has spent the last 15 years campaigning against the practice. Rabha was instrumental in the passing of the Assam Witch Hunting (Prohibition Prevention and Protection) Act, which many say is India's toughest anti-witch-hunting law and in 2021 was recognised for her work by the Government of India with the prestigious Padma Shri award.

== See also ==
- 2017 hair and braid chopping incidents in India
- Indian WhatsApp lynchings
- Modern witch-hunts
- Witch-hunt
- Witch-hunts in Nepal
- Witch-hunts in Papua New Guinea
