= Witch hunts in Papua New Guinea =

Witch hunts in Papua New Guinea are still occurring in the twenty-first century. They are attacks launched against predominantly female victims accused of using sorcery, commonly known as 'sanguma', with malevolent intent. In 2012 the Law Reform Commission concluded that since the 1980s sorcery-related attacks had been on the rise. For example, in the province of Simbu alone more than 150 cases of witch-hunting occur each year. Local activists also estimate that in total over fifty-thousand people have been chased from their homes as a result of witchcraft accusations.

Although the nature of witch-hunting varies across Papua New Guinea, a very ethnically diverse country, in most cases, witchcraft accusations are triggered by the illness or death of a family member or friend, leading to relatives and other villagers seeking vengeance against the suspected 'witch' who they believe to have caused their misfortune. Attacks on those branded as witches are usually very violent, with victims often being subjected to prolonged physical, emotional and sexual torture. In serious cases, accused witches are killed by large mobs using brutal methods, for instance, burning alive is a still common form of execution.

There are many underlying causes as to why witch hunts occur in Papua New Guinea. High rates of HIV/AIDS and increasing rates of diseases caused by drug and alcohol abuse, alongside a general lack of quality healthcare provision, have led to a rise in deaths in many Papua New Guinean communities, which usually form the basis of sanguma accusations. Migration and social dislocation caused by the use of land for extracting natural resources as well as new development and rapid modernisation have also led to disruption and the spread of sanguma beliefs, helping to make the country fertile ground for witch-hunting.

== Overview ==
A witch hunt is started after a victim is singled out by neighbours, relatives or other community members as a scapegoat for illness, death and other misfortune. Sometimes communities seek the help of a 'witch doctor', a person who practices sorcery but openly declares not to use it for malevolent purposes, to identify a witch. Being a witch doctor is a recognised occupation in many villages and practitioners are often paid well for their services.

Although men have been known to be accused of witchcraft, women and girls are six times more likely to be branded as a witch than men according to Amnesty International. More vulnerable women are particularly at risk, such as single mothers, widows, the infirm, the mentally ill and women who have fewer male relatives who could advocate for and protect them if they were to be labelled a witch. One reason for this is the belief that the female body is more suited to host a 'witch spirit' than a man's as these evil spirits prefer to reside in a woman's womb. The likelihood of being branded as a witch also tends to increase if a family member has been accused of the same crime in the past as it is believed that the ability to perform black magic is passed down through generations.

Once someone is suspected of witchcraft they can be tortured in order to extract a confession to 'prove' their crime. Methods of torture include beating (sometimes with barbed wire), hanging over fire, burning with hot irons, cutting, flaying and amputation of body parts and raping. For example, in November 2017 a young girl was blamed for the illness of a cousin, diagnosed as kaikai lewa (to eat the heart), where a witch uses black magic to remove and eat a person's heart. Shortly after, the girl was abducted and tortured for five days, being strung up by the ankles and flayed with hot machetes in order to force an admission of witchcraft and get her to 'return' her cousin's heart.

In cases where an alleged victim of sanguma does not recover, accused witches can be killed by large mobs as a way of seeking revenge. Those branded as a witch can be executed in a number of brutal ways. For example, there are cases where victims have been hung, burned alive, hacked to death with machetes, stoned and buried alive in witch hunts across the country. Even if the accused survives, in most instances, the effects of physical, sexual and emotional torture caused by sorcery-related attacks lead to long-lasting trauma for survivors.

== Causal factors ==
=== Rapid development ===
Papua New Guinea is a country rich in natural resources and in recent decades it has undergone modernisation and industrialisation at a rapid rate. China, for example, invested approximately $5.9 billion in over two hundred different development projects between 2011 and 2019, according to Australian think-tank The Lowy Institute. The speed of development and its unevenness has led to significant social upheaval as more people leave their villages to seek employment or are forced off their land to make way for the extraction of natural resources. As a result, new communities of economic migrants have formed without traditional authority figures (village chiefs and elders) or tribal justice systems to address sanguma accusations, allowing unruly, angry mobs, often led by young men affected by alcohol and drugs, to target innocent people in witch hunts as scapegoats for their misfortunes.

Furthermore, increased access to technology like mobile phones and the internet, and the construction of new roads have connected communities that were once isolated from each other to the rest of the country. Therefore, development has facilitated the spread of sanguma beliefs from traditionally isolated settlements in Papua New Guinea's remote highlands to its lowland towns and cities. Social media has also allowed witchcraft accusations to spread faster and with a wider reach. For example, in one case an alleged witch who was forced to flee her home because of her dangerous sanguma accusation was attacked in the community she relocated to after being recognised from a viral Facebook post.

=== Jealousy ===
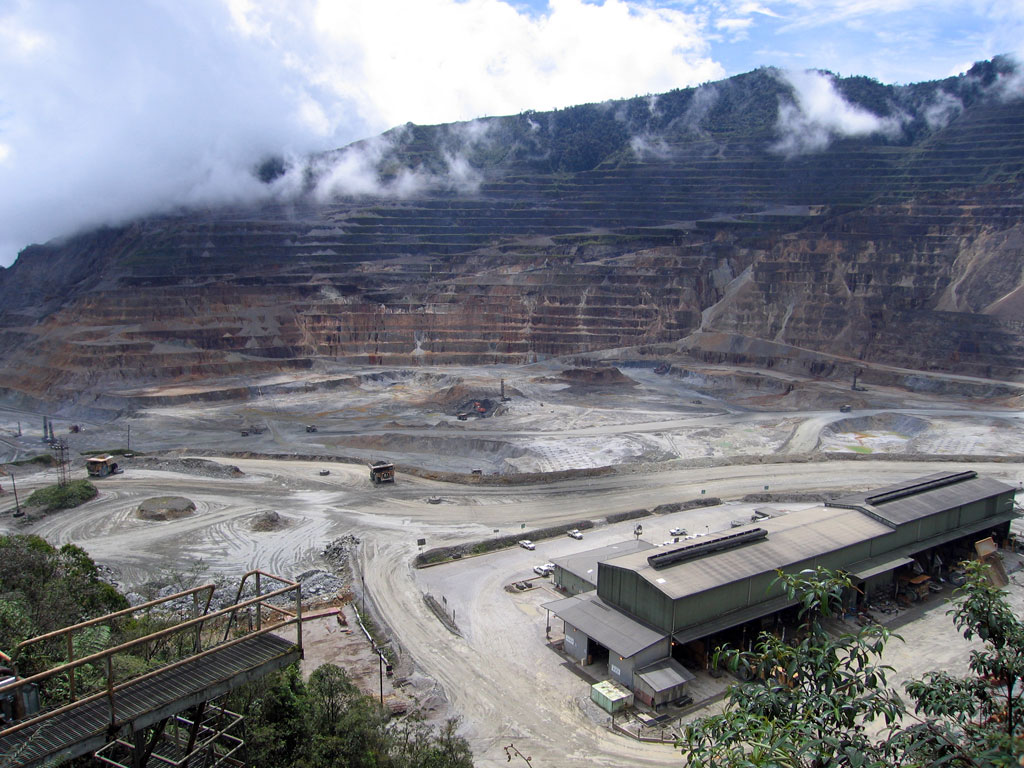
A mine in Papua New Guinea

Some argue that the recent rise in witch-hunting cases has come about as a result of economic jealousy caused by Papua New Guinea's recent mining boom, which has significantly widened the gap between the wealthy and poor. This economic divide has bred resentment amongst the less well-off, leading to sorcery-related attacks being carried out on wealthier neighbours and relatives as an excuse to grab their land and property and to stop them from continuing their own development.

Arguably witch-hunts have also been caused more specifically by jealousy of women, who in recent years have gradually become more financially independent. For instance, more and more women now own businesses, become lawyers, healthcare professionals and run for government office. Douglas Young, the archbishop of Mount Hagen, has corroborated this idea, stating that when young Papua New Guinean men (70-90% of whom are unemployed) see women take on traditional male roles in society, they wish to reassert their power and retaliate, leading to witch-hunts and brutal acts of violence against vulnerable female community members.

=== Lack of legal consequences for perpetrators ===
Another reason behind the violence is that perpetrators rarely face conviction and prosecution for witch-hunting. A 20-year-long study by the Australian National University found less than one percent of perpetrators were successfully prosecuted in 1,440 cases of torture and 600 killings. The main reasons for this are first that witnesses and survivors of witch-hunts fear that speaking out could provoke an attack on them or their property. Moreover, police in Papua New Guinea are understaffed and paid poorly and some are just as likely to believe that victims are real witches as perpetrators; overcrowded prisons also deter them from investigating these crimes.

Additionally, until 2013, the country also had a law which allowed murderers to use an allegation of witchcraft as a legitimate defence in court and acknowledged "widespread belief throughout the country that there is such a thing as sorcery, and sorcerers have extra-ordinary powers that can be used sometimes for good purposes but more often bad ones" in the 1971 Sorcery Act.

=== Poor healthcare provision ===
In Papua New Guinea roughly 80% of the population lives in remote rural communities, many of which are without electricity, water and healthcare. Because of these poor living standards and the fact that so many do not have access to quality healthcare, early and preventable deaths are common. This problem has been worsened by rising rates of HIV/AIDS, alcohol and drug-related illnesses and deaths (such as heart attacks and strokes), and the COVID-19 pandemic. The growing prevalence of previously unknown diseases and an increasing number of untimely deaths, compounded with a poor standard of education, has increased the likelihood of people seeking scapegoats to blame for their suffering and of them turning to irrational superstitious beliefs, like witchcraft, to explain sudden deaths and illness in their communities.

== Efforts to end witch hunting ==
Legal efforts to prevent the practice of witch hunting and branding have been made by the government of Papua New Guinea. One of the most notable examples of this was the repeal of the 1971 Sorcery Act in 2013. This controversial act acknowledged the existence of witchcraft and criminalised it, punishing accused witches with up to two years in prison. Under the act, murderers could also use a witchcraft allegation as a legitimate defence in court and reduce their prison sentences if sorcery was involved in their case. Furthermore, in the same year, the death penalty was reintroduced for murder, in an attempt to reduce sorcery-related lynching and murders. Many believe this legal crackdown on witch hunts was prompted by the high-profile media case of Kepari Leniata, a 20-year-old woman who was burned alive by a mob after being accused of using witchcraft to kill a young boy.

The effectiveness of these legislative changes has been questioned as sorcery accusation related violence is still on the rise in the country. One of the key problems halting progress are low rates of conviction of witch-hunters, evidenced in a 20-year-long study by the Australian National University, which showed that less than one per cent of perpetrators from over 2,000 cases of witchcraft-related torture and killings were prosecuted.

National and international non-governmental organisations (NGOs) play an important role in the drive to end witch-hunts in Papua New Guinea. Many focus on educating communities on the negative impacts of witch-hunts, for instance through holding discussions, workshops and reaching out to community leaders and local influencers. NGOs also combat witch-hunting and branding by taking steps to alleviate poverty in communities vulnerable to harmful superstitions. Oxfam, for example, has advocated providing access to clean water, hygiene education and improved agricultural practices to reduce the likelihood of sickness and premature deaths, common triggers of witch-branding.

Anti-witch hunting activists have also aided the fight against the practice. For example, Ruth Kissam is a community organiser and human rights activist who in 2013 advocated for the repeal of the 1971 Sorcery Act, playing a critical role in the success of its removal. Today, Kissam works with the Papua New Guinea Tribal Foundation, an organisation that works in areas of maternal and child health, education, and gender-based violence. Here she led the Senisim Pasin (Change Behaviour) film campaign, a national campaign aimed at changing cultural attitudes about how women are valued in PNG. Additionally, the foundation has been responsible for the rescue and repatriation of over 150 women since its creation in 2013. Kissam herself rescued and in 2018 adopted Kerpari Leniata's six-year-old daughter who, like her mother, also suffered abuse and torture at the hands of witch-hunters.

== See also ==
- Monica Paulus - Campaigner against sorcery-related violence in Papua New Guinea
- Modern witch-hunts
- Witch hunts in Nepal
- Witch hunts in India
