= Kichkandi =

Nepalese folklore spirit

In Nepalese folklore or mythology, kichkanya (Nepali: किच्कन्या) also referred to as Kichkandi (Nepali: किच्कन्डी) is a spirit of a woman that is latched to an uncremated part of her dead body, usually a bone.

They are generally known to be solitary spirits that haunt a particular location. Children often grow up hearing the stories of such tortured souls of women who wander the site of their untimely death. These women while alive were treated unfairly in some manner or died during childbirth or pregnancy. According to sightings, they are supposed to have unusually long black hair, pale and bony complexion and dressed up in a red bridal dress. It is said that they can be identified by looking at their feet, which face backward.

People usually describe them as alluring and young female, who lures a lonely male traveler and saps their life force. The victims are said to turn out drained of their life and skinny. According to other tales told by locals and cab drivers, these spirits are also known to hitchhike late at night. When the drivers of the vehicle or motorbike follow her directions, they end up in cremation grounds in a temple or a cemetery.

== In popular culture ==
In Bhoot Police, a 2021 Bollywood film, the tea estate of the character Maya(played by Yami Gautam) is haunted by a kichkandi.

== See also ==
- Nepalese folklore
- Ghost Festival (Nepal)
- Kichkalnya
