= Papua New Guinea Constitutional and Law Reform Commission =

The Papua New Guinea Constitutional and Law Reform Commission (CLRC-PNG) is a government commission in Papua New Guinea. Established by parliamentary act in 2004 as the "Constitutional and Law Reform Commission of Papua New Guinea", the Commission is charged with considering reforms to the law of Papua New Guinea.

== History ==
The Law Reform Commission Act of 1975 established a Law Reform Commission of Papua New Guinea. From 1975 to 1978 the Commission's chairman was Bernard Narokobi. A separate Constitutional Commission was established by the Constitutional Commission Act of 1993. The 2004 Act united these two bodies.

In 2009 the Commission established a working committee to review the law on sorcery and related killings.

Eric Kwa became the Commission's chairman in 2011, and held the post until 2018. The current chairman is Kevin Isifu. The Deputy Secretary, and former Acting Secretary, is Dorothy Mimiko-Kesenga.
