= Modern witch hunts =

Witchcraft-related laws by country: Practice of magic is illegal Using witchcraft against another person is illegal Accusing someone of being a witch is illegal Pretending to be a witch and accusing someone of being a witch is illegal Practice of fortune-telling is illegal Law repealed

Witch hunts are a contemporary phenomenon occurring globally, with notable occurrences in Sub-Saharan Africa, India, Nepal, and Papua New Guinea. Modern witch hunts surpass the body counts of early-modern witch-hunting. Sub-Saharan Africa, particularly the Democratic Republic of Congo, South Africa, Tanzania, Kenya, and Nigeria, experiences a high prevalence of witch-hunting. In Cameroon, accusations have resurfaced in courts, often involving child-witchcraft scares. Gambia witnessed government-sponsored witch hunts, leading to abductions, forced confessions, and deaths.

In Ghana, witch hunting has historical roots, with sanctuaries for victims identified. In the southern regions, accusations tend to remain peaceful, while mass-panics involving media-induced hysteria have occurred. Kenya has a history of witch-hunts, with lynchings reported in the past. Nigeria sees accusations leading to deadly consequences, often considered a form of community service. Tanzania has witnessed intense witch-hunts, with economic strains and exploitation as contributing factors. Zambia experienced witchfinders using a mix of Christian and native traditions.

In India, witch hunts involve accusations against women, often widows or divorcees, leading to violence and sometimes death. Indonesia has a history of superstition and belief in witchcraft, with vigilante witch-hunts reported post-Suharto era. In Nepal, low-caste women are targeted in witch hunts due to superstitions, lack of education, and societal issues. Papua New Guinea experiences extrajudicial torture and murder of alleged witches, driven by jealousy and economic factors. Witch-hunts against children have seen a significant increase in sub-Saharan regions, with estimates of 40,000 child-related witch-hunt orphans in Kinshasa alone.

== Africa ==
Most witch hunts today take place in modern sub-Saharan Africa. The majority of ethnographic literature on the subject remains on a local level. Summarizing studies and meta-analysis remain scarce due to the amount of data involved. Max Marwick, John Middleton, Mary Douglas and Lucy Mair were among the first to cover a wider range of witch-hunts. In recent times, Wolfgang Behringer has provided an overview about witch hunts throughout history and continents.

A particularly high prevalence of recent witch hunting has been noted for the DRC, South Africa, Tanzania, Kenya and Nigeria. Other states showing ongoing and repeated witch hunts are Malawi, Ghana, Gambia, Benin, Angola and Central African Republic. While some societies suffer at most sporadic and low-level witch-hunts (Senegal, Namibia, Rwanda), the entire Sub-Saharan Africa shows a high prevalence of beliefs in the existence of witchcraft and a considerable prevalence of violent witch hunts. Nonetheless, many if not most ethnic groups believe in the existence of witchcraft but do not or do not normally accuse people of witchcraft. Where accusations occur, accusations do not all lead to violence and can even be used for benefits by the accused person.

=== Cameroon ===
Several African states, including Cameroon, reestablished witchcraft-accusations in courts after their independence. From Cameroon, Robert Brain and Peter Geschiere delivered ethnographic accounts on a child-witchcraft scare that tended to remain largely peacefully. After confessions, the accused or self-accused children were rewarded with large amounts of meat to induce a purifying vomiting. In addition, witch doctors have been used as expert witnesses in trials, according to a 1998 study.

In 2017, it was reported that the Cameroonian President Paul Biya had urged citizens to use witchcraft as a means of combatting Boko Haram.

=== Gambia ===
In March 2009, Amnesty International reported that up to 1,000 people in Gambia had been abducted by government-sponsored "witch doctors" on charges of witchcraft, and taken to detention centers where they were forced to drink a poisonous concoction at gunpoint, known as kubejaro. On 21 May 2009, the New York Times reported that the alleged witch-hunting campaign had been sparked by the Gambian President, Yahya Jammeh. The president continued a series of "witch hunts" over the next seven years, in which rural villagers experienced beatings, kidnappings, and forced confessions (after the ingestion of kubejaro, which often made the victims extremely weak or unconscious). Deaths that occurred during the time were due to the side effects of drinking kubejaro, such as kidney failure, or beatings. Later, the Gambian government launched an investigation of these crimes and opened a center to support the victims. A Washington Post report found that many of the victims had received no support or outreach from such initiatives. Many of the victims also still suffer from health problems, such as pains, weakness, and anxiety.

Jammeh fled the country in 2017 after losing an election. In January 2019, investigators began interviewing people about their experiences of the atrocities, as either torturers or victims. The hearings may last two years. Meanwhile, the truth and reconciliation commission publicizes the interviews through social media.

=== Ghana ===
Research on witch hunting in Ghana dates back into the early 20th century. Arthur W. Cardinall may be the first anthropologist to mention the ghetto for victims of witch-hunts at an earth-shrine in Gnani (Tindang, Gnaani). A later research paper by Susan Drucker-Brown observed and discussed the renowned ghetto in Gambaga. Witches in Exile, the 2004 documentary by Allison Berg, followed the structure of accusations in Kukuo, the biggest ghetto near Bimbilla. Another documentary, The Witches of Gambaga, follows over 10 years the inmates of Gambaga. The Bradt Travel Guides mentions the ghetto in Gambaga as a tourist attraction. A total of eight sanctuaries for witch-hunt victims were listed by the Ethnologist Felix Riedel. The list of sanctuaries includes so far (locations with inmates):

- Kukuo (Bimbilla, Nanumba South): 450.
- Tindang (Gnani, Gnaani): 350.
- Gushiegu: 120.
- Gambaga: 80.
- Nabule (Chereponi): 55.
- Kpatinga: 40.
- Duabone: 10.
- Banyasi (Bonyanse): 3–8.

While all are sanctuaries that offer protection for outcasts, at least five of the eight ghettoes are dominated by an earth-priest. They then serve as sites for traditional exorcisms, that involve a chicken-ordeal to determine the guilt or innocence of an accused person and a concoction to cleanse the supposed witchcraft-power. The local earth is believed to neutralize the witchcraft powers.

Ethnographic research and journalistic interest in the comparably safe and well-researched Northern Ghana sometimes lead to an overrepresentation of Ghana what witch-hunting concerns. Neighbouring regions and countries appear underrepresented in current research in comparison.

In the southern parts of Ghana as in its urban areas witch-hunting as mass-violence occurs, but far less frequent than in the Northern Regions. Deadly mass-panics in Accra and Kumasi involved media-induced penis-theft-hysterias common throughout Western and Central Africa. In general, witchcraft accusations in Southern Ghana today tend to stay rather peaceful or at least quiet, leading to social isolation of a person. A study of Van der Geest also showed, that almost every person in a Southern Ghanaian town has both experienced an accusation and accused another person.

In the early 20th century, several witch hunting movements spread from Northern Ghana's shrine Tongnaab into Southern Ghana and into Nigeria. Those movements tended to stay rather peaceful, while harassment, beating and fining of accused persons occurred on a regular basis.

=== Kenya ===
Kenya has a long-covered history of witch hunts. In the past years, lynchings were a frequent feature of public violence. For example, it was reported on 21 May 2008 that in Kenya a mob had burnt to death at least 11 people accused of witchcraft.

The Western region of Kenya is particularly known for witch hunts, and the district of Kisii has been labeled a "sorcery belt". In this region, elders are often targeted and labeled as witches.

=== Nigeria ===
People accused of being witches in Nigeria include a seventy-year-old widow from Irrua named Auntie B. As of 2019, she had avoided being made to drink a magical potion of toxic substances. In the nearby Ozalla community, at least twenty accused people since 2004 have died under similar circumstances. "Killing an alleged witch is considered a form of community service, a way to avenge and neutralize the source of danger to the community." In 2012, 70-year-old Rebecca Adewumi was tortured to death in Omuo Ekiti by youths who accused her of witchcraft.

=== Tanzania ===
Tanzania has seen some of the most intense witch-hunts in Africa, with an estimated 20,000 people brought to death throughout the past 20 years. Mostly elderly women were affected by the violence. As a main factor, economic strains and exploitation are named by documentaries, state-reports and independent observers.

As much as 93% of the population believe in magic and witchcraft, and witchdoctors play an important role in society as healers, and everyday helpers, with as much as 100,000 registered in the county's healthcare system protocols. Black magic and witchcraft are feared and not just for superstitious reasons. Incidents of abductions, maimings and even bestial killings by witchdoctors and their helpers, are regularly experienced in Tanzania, where human body parts are used in some witchcraft rituals or as magical charms. In particular the country's albino population is targeted for this, but not exclusively.

=== Zambia ===
Audrey I. Richards, in the journal Africa, relates in 1935 an instance when a new wave of witchfinders, the Bamucapi, appeared in the villages of the Bemba people of Zambia. They dressed in European clothing, and would summon the headman to prepare a ritual meal for the village. When the villagers arrived they would view them all in a mirror, and claimed they could identify witches with this method. These accused persons would then have to "yield up his horns"; i.e. give over the horn containers for curses and evil potions to the witch-finders. The bamucapi then made all drink a potion called kucapa which would cause a witch to die and swell up if he ever tried such things again.

The villagers related that the witch-finders were always right because the witches they found were always the people whom the village had feared all along. The bamucapi utilised a mixture of Christian and native religious traditions to account for their powers and said that God (not specifying which god) helped them to prepare their medicine. In addition, all witches who did not attend the meal to be identified would be called to account later on by their master, who had risen from the dead, and who would force the witches by means of drums to go to the graveyard, where they would die. Richards noted that the bamucapi created the sense of danger in the villages by rounding up all the horns in the village, whether they were used for anti-witchcraft charms, potions, snuff or were indeed receptacles of black magic.

== Asia ==
=== India ===
Some people in India, mostly in villages, have the belief that witchcraft and black magic are effective. On one hand, people may seek advice from witch doctors for health, financial or marital problems. On the other hand, people, especially women, are accused of witchcraft and attacked, occasionally killed. It has been reported that mostly widows or divorcees are targeted to rob them of their property. Reportedly, revered village witch-doctors are paid to brand specific persons as witches (dayan), so that they can be killed without repercussions. The existing laws have been considered ineffective in curbing the murders. In June 2013, National Commission for Women (NCW) reported that according to National Crime Records Bureau (NCRB) statistics, 768 women had been murdered for allegedly practising witchcraft since 2008 and announced plans for newer laws.

==== Recent cases ====
Between 2001 and 2006, an estimated 300 people were killed in the state of Assam. Between 2005 and 2010, about 35 witchcraft related murders reportedly took place in Odisha's Sundergarh district. In October 2003, three women were branded as witches and humiliated, afterwards they all committed suicide in Kamalpura village in Muzaffarpur district in Bihar. In August 2013, a couple were hacked to death by a group of people in Kokrajhar district in Assam. In September 2013, in the Jashpur district of Chhattisgarh, a woman was murdered and her daughter was raped on the allegation that they were practising black magic.

A 2010 estimate places the number of women killed as witches in India at between 150 and 200 per year, or a total of 2,500 in the period of 1995 to 2009. The lynchings are particularly common in the poor northern states of Jharkhand, Bihar and the central state of Chhattisgarh. Witch hunts are also taking place among the tea garden workers in Jalpaiguri district, West Bengal. The witch hunts in Jalpaiguri are less known, but are motivated by the stress in the tea industry on the lives of the adivasi (tribal) workers.

In India, labeling a woman as a witch is a common ploy to grab land, settle scores or even to punish her for turning down sexual advances. In a majority of the cases, it is difficult for the accused woman to reach out for help and she is forced to either abandon her home and family or driven to commit suicide. Most cases are not documented because it is difficult for poor and illiterate women to travel from isolated regions to file police reports. Less than 2 percent of those accused of witch-hunting are actually convicted, according to a study by the Free Legal Aid Committee, a group that works with victims in the state of Jharkhand.

=== Indonesia ===
Superstition and belief in magic is most common in Indonesia, where services from dukun, as Indonesian male and female witch-doctors are called, help with healings, blessings, fortune telling, and other magical tasks in everyday life on a regular basis. Belief in, and fear of, black magic and sorcery from dukun is also prevalent and a source of conflict and sometimes even witch-hunts and killings.

The collapse of the violent Suharto era in 1998 was accompanied by vigilante witch-hunts with about 400 killings in the following years, including the 1998 East Java ninja scare. The large scale persecutions has diminished since then, but accusations, witch-hunts and sometimes killings still occur regularly on a smaller scale in Indonesia. It is unclear if superstition and genuine fear of sorcery is the motivating factor in these incidents, or the prospect of grabbing victims' possessions and property is more important. The law and penal code of Indonesia does not encompass magic or the supernatural, but there has been public pressure and debate about including it since at least 1981, hoping to outlaw witches and witchcraft.

=== Nepal ===
Witch hunts in Nepal are common, and are targeted especially against low-caste women. The main causes of witchcraft related violence include widespread belief in superstition, lack of education, lack of public awareness, illiteracy, caste system, male domination, and economic dependency of women on men. The victims of this form of violence are often beaten, tortured, publicly humiliated, and murdered. Sometimes, the family members of the accused are also assaulted. In 2010, Sarwa Dev Prasad Ojha, Minister for Women and Social Welfare, said, "Superstitions are deeply rooted in our society, and the belief in witchcraft is one of the worst forms of this."

=== Papua New Guinea ===
Though the practice of "white" magic (such as faith healing) is legal in Papua New Guinea, the 1976 Sorcery Act imposes a penalty of up to two years in prison for the practice of "black" magic. In 2009, the government reports that extrajudicial torture and murder of alleged witches—usually lone women—are spreading from the highland areas to cities as villagers migrate to urban areas. For example, in June 2013, four women were accused of witchcraft because the family "had a 'permanent house' made of wood, and the family had tertiary educations and high social standing". All of the women were tortured and Helen Rumbali was beheaded. Helen Hakena, chairwoman of the North Bougainville Human Rights Committee, said that the accusations started because of economic jealousy born of a mining boom.

Reports by UN agencies, Amnesty International, Oxfam and anthropologists show that "attacks on accused sorcerers and witches—sometimes men, but most commonly women—are frequent, ferocious and often fatal." It's estimated about 150 cases of violence and killings are occurring each year in just the province of Simbu in Papua New Guinea alone. Reports indicate this practice of witch hunting has in some places evolved into "something more malignant, sadistic and voyeuristic." One woman who was attacked by young men from a nearby village "had her genitals burned and fused beyond functional repair by the repeated intrusions of red-hot irons." Few incidents are ever reported, according to the 2012 Law Reform Commission, which concluded that they have increased since the 1980s.

== Other regions ==
=== Amazonia ===
Neil L. Whitehead and Robin Wright presented a collection of essays on witch-hunts among native tribes in the amazon high- and lowlands. While prevalent in many tribes, especially child-witch-hunts among Ashaninka have attracted interest and raised questions about methodological strategies in reporting abusive practices in an already biased environment.

=== Bolivia ===
Witch trials have taken place in the parallel justice of the Guaraní until the 1990s.

=== Brazil ===
In 2017, an effigy of philosopher Judith Butler was burned as a witch while she helped organize a conference at SESC, a research organization in São Paulo. Butler was accused of witchcraft at a protest, and was accused of trying to destroy people's gender identities and trying to undermine the values of the country.

=== Peru ===
The rondas campesinas perform witch trials.

=== Saudi Arabia ===
Witchcraft or sorcery remains a criminal offense in Saudi Arabia, although the precise nature of the crime is undefined.

The frequency of prosecutions for this in the country as whole is unknown. In November 2009, it was reported that 118 persons had been arrested in the province of Makkah that year for practising magic and "using the Book of Allah in a derogatory manner", 74% of them being female. According to Human Rights Watch in 2009, prosecutions for witchcraft and sorcery are proliferating and "Saudi courts are sanctioning a literal witch hunt by the religious police."

In 2006, an illiterate Saudi woman, Fawza Falih, was convicted of practising witchcraft, including casting an impotence spell, and sentenced to death by beheading, after allegedly being beaten and forced to fingerprint a false confession that had not been read to her. After an appeal court had cast doubt on the validity of the death sentence because the confession had been retracted, the lower court reaffirmed the same sentence on a different basis.

In 2007, Mustafa Ibrahim, an Egyptian national, was executed, having been convicted of using sorcery in an attempt to separate a married couple, as well as of adultery and of desecrating the Quran.

Also in 2007, Abdul Hamid Bin Hussain Bin Moustafa al-Fakki, a Sudanese national, was sentenced to death after being convicted of producing a spell that would lead to the reconciliation of a divorced couple.

In 2009, Ali Sibat, a Lebanese television presenter who had been arrested whilst on a pilgrimage in Saudi Arabia, was sentenced to death for witchcraft arising out of his fortune-telling on an Arab satellite channel. His appeal was accepted by one court, but a second in Medina upheld his death sentence again in March 2010, stating that he deserved it as he had publicly practised sorcery in front of millions of viewers for several years. In November 2010, the Supreme Court refused to ratify the death sentence, stating that there was insufficient evidence that his actions had harmed others.

On 12 December 2011, Amina bint Abdulhalim Nassar was beheaded in Al Jawf Province after being convicted of practicing witchcraft and sorcery. Another very similar situation occurred to Muree bin Ali bin Issa al-Asiri and he was beheaded on 19 June 2012 in the Najran Province.

== Children ==
Witch-hunts against children appear in the early ethnographic literature and in many modern circumstances. In Cameroon, DRC, Ghana, but also in Brazil sporadic child-witch-hunts have a tradition of at least 100 years. In the past 20 years and especially in the past 10 years an unprecedented increases in child-witch-hunting has been noted in Southern Nigeria, DRC, Angola, Ghana and other sub-Saharan regions. Several sources estimate 40,000 children in Kinshasa alone as witch-hunt-related orphans.

== See also ==
- Moral panic – Fear that some evil threatens society
- Satanic panic – Widespread moral panic alleging abuse
