= Nepalese folklore =

Mythology and beliefs of Nepali people

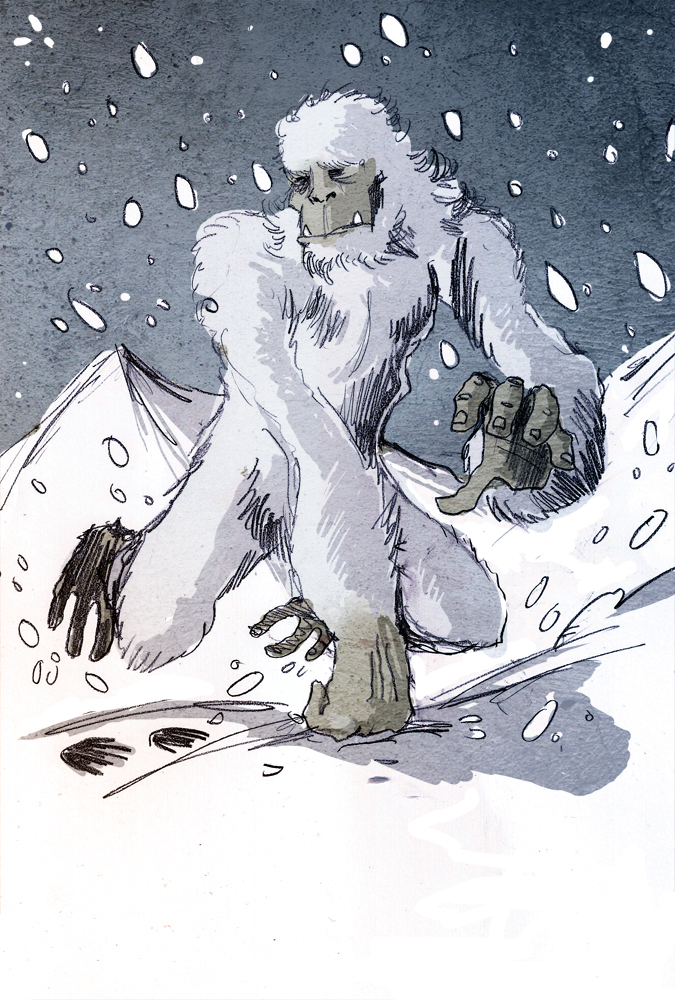
Yeti

Nepali folklore is a diverse set of mythology and traditional beliefs held by the Nepali people.

== Folk beliefs ==
- Banjhakri and Banjhakrini, supernatural shamans of the forest.
- Bir, a demon
- Boksi, a witch
- Budhahang, legendary Kirati king who could stop movement of sun
- Chhauda, a child ghost
- Kichkandi, type a female ghost.
- Khyah, mythical creatures
- Lakhey and Majipa Lakhey, types of demon.
- Masan, a demon
- Murkatta, a headless ghost with eyes and mouth in chest
- Yeti, an ape-like creature purported to inhabit the mountains of Nepal.

== See also ==
- Culture of Nepal
