= Ghost Festival (Nepal) =

Festival in Nepal

Ghost Festival (भुतमेला, bhoot mela) takes place on the full moon day of the month of Kartik (October/November) in Siraha district of Nepal at the Kamala River. In this festival, shamans are believed to cure illnesses thought to be caused caused by family deities, or evil people in their village by using tantric power.

== History ==
The festival is a centuries-old tradition celebrated every year on the full moon day of Kartik to control the influence of ghosts and Boksi. The festival occurs at the same time as Dashain. The origin of this festival is not known.

== Activities ==
Thousands of people, mostly from Dhanusha District and India take part in the event. During the night, people chant mantras while shamans practice various rituals near the temple of Sonamai (सोनामाई). Shamans classify the possessions into two groups. First one is the people possessed by the soul of another person who suffered an untimely or unwanted death (ghosts). Second, are the ones possessed by their lineage to god or goddess and therefore considered godly.

Food and temporary shelters are generally provided by the organization committee for the pilgrimages.

== Controversy ==
The practice is considered to be superstitious and victimizing the marginalized community such as the lower caste Dalit community.
