= Bhoot Police =

2021 Indian film by Pavan Kirpalani

- Official release poster
- Directed by: Pavan Kirpalani
- Written by: Pavan Kirpalani; Sumit Batheja; Pooja Ladha Surti
- Produced by: Ramesh Taurani; Akshai Puri
- Starring: Saif Ali Khan; Arjun Kapoor; Jacqueline Fernandez; Yami Gautam; Javed Jaffrey
- Cinematography: Jaya Krishna Gummadi
- Edited by: Pooja Ladha Surti
- Music by: Songs: Sachin–Jigar; Background Score: Clinton Cerejo
- Production companies: Tips Industries; 12 Street Entertainment
- Distributed by: Disney+ Hotstar
- Release date: 10 September 2021
- Running time: 129 minutes
- Country: India
- Language: Hindi

Bhoot Police (transl. Ghost police) is a 2021 Indian Hindi-language horror comedy film, directed by Pavan Kirpalani and produced by Ramesh Taurani and Akshai Puri. The film stars Saif Ali Khan, Arjun Kapoor, Jacqueline Fernandez, Yami Gautam and Javed Jaffrey, and premiered on 10 September 2021 on Disney+ Hotstar.

== Plot ==
Two brothers, Vibhooti "Vibhu" Vaidya (Saif Ali Khan) and Chiraunji "Chiku" Vaidya (Arjun Kapoor), run a fake exorcism business, conning people by exploiting their superstitions. They arrive in a village in Rajasthan to "exorcise" a girl, but Vibhooti discovers that she is pretending to be possessed to avoid an arranged marriage. They help her by staging a fake exorcism.

Later, at a Tantric fair, Chiraunji deciphers an ancient book that belonged to their father, Umedji Vaidya a.k.a. Ullat Baba (Saurabh Sachdeva), a legendary exorcist. While trying to escape from Inspector Chedilal (Javed Jaffrey), they meet Maya "Mayu" Kulbhushan (Yami Gautam), who seeks their help with a supernatural problem in Dharamshala.

Maya explains that 27 years earlier, their father banished a malevolent spirit, the Kichkandi (Kalsang Dolma), from her family's tea estate. Now, the Kichkandi has returned and is terrorising the workers. Despite Vibhooti's scepticism, they investigate and learn about the spirit's tragic past. Vibhooti accidentally releases the Kichkandi, leading to Maya's possession.

After initially planning to fake another exorcism, Vibhooti realises that the ghost is real. The brothers discover that the Kichkandi is searching for her daughter, Titli Meena (Youngykar Dolma), a ghost Vibhooti had encountered earlier. With their father's knowledge, they reunite the mother and daughter, freeing their spirits.

The film ends with Maya and her sister Kanika "Kanu" Kulbhushan (Jacqueline Fernandez) reconciling, and a hint at a sequel involving werewolves and vampires.

== Cast ==
- Saif Ali Khan as Vibhooti "Vibhu" Vaidya
- Arjun Kapoor as Chiraunji "Chiku" Vaidya
- Jacqueline Fernandez as Kanika "Kanu" Kulbhushan
- Yami Gautam as Maya "Mayu" Kulbhushan
- Javed Jaffrey as Inspector Chedilal
- Amit Mistry as GM Hari Kumar
- Jamie Lever as Lata
- Saurabh Sachdeva as Umedji Vaidya a.k.a. Ullat Baba
- Yashaswini Dayama as Guddi
- Girish Kulkarni as Santo
- Rupesh Tillu as Vinod
- Rajpal Yadav as Goggal Baba (special appearance)
- Kalsang Dolma as Kichkandi
- Youngykar Dolma as Titli Meena

== Production ==
The principal photography commenced on 4 November 2020 in Dharamshala.

== Soundtrack ==
Bhoot Police

Soundtrack album by Sachin–Jigar
- Released: 12 September 2021
- Recorded: 2020
- Genre: Feature film soundtrack
- Length: 13:32
- Language: Hindi
- Label: Tips Music

Sachin–Jigar chronology
Roohi (2021)	Bhoot Police (2021)	Shiddat (2021)

The music of film was composed by Sachin–Jigar while lyrics written by Kumaar and Priya Saraiya.

Track listing
No.	Title	Lyrics	Singer(s)	Length
1.	"Aayi Aayi Bhoot Police"	Kumaar	Vishal Dadlani, Sunidhi Chauhan, Mellow D	4:46
2.	"Mujhe Pyaar Pyaar Hai"	Priya Saraiya	Armaan Malik, Shreya Ghoshal	5:11
3.	"Raat Gayi So Baat Gayi"	Kumaar	Vishal Dadlani, Asees Kaur	3:35
Total length:				13:32

== Reception ==
Bollywood Hungama gave it a rating of 3 stars out of 5 and wrote, "Pavan Kirpalani's story gives a deja vu of Stree and Roohi. But unlike the other two films, it focuses on ghostbusters and that gives a unique touch." Koimoi gave it a positive review, rating of 3 stars out of 5 and said, "If You've Got It, Haunt It’ & Saif Ali Khan Does The Same!". Firstpost gave it a rating of 3 stars out of 5 and wrote, "Saif Ali Khan sizzles in a breezy horror comedy."

NDTV gave it a rating of 2.5 stars out of 5 stars and wrote, Saif Ali Khan Brings His Flair For Comedy To Breezy Caper Film. Times of India gave it 2 stars out of 5 and wrote,"A childish horror comedy."
