= Murkatta =

Headless ghost from Nepali folklore

Murkatta (Nepali: मुर्कट्टा) is a headless ghost with eyes and mouth in chest and carrying its head tucked under its arm. Murkatta is mentioned in various Nepali culture and traditions. They are considered as the spirits from the dead.

The Murkatta is also interpreted as a person whose head has been cut down, symbolizing the defeat or a loss of intellect.

== In contemporary culture and religion ==
The concept of Murkatta has inspired various works in contemporary culture, arts and literature. Some are listed below.

- In Kathmandu, Nepal, a festival is celebrated on the day of Ghode Jatra to scare away the Murkatta and prevent its evil eyes from the children.
- In Varanasi, India, a fifth century headless sculpture of the Buddha is worshipped as Murkatta Baba.
- The Sisne mountain (Nepali:सिस्ने हिमाल) in Rukum district is nicknamed as Murkatta in local language.
- Murkatta Lass is a Nepali book by Dirgabahu.

== See also ==
- Nepalese folklore
