= Birubala Rabha =

Indian activist (1954–2024)

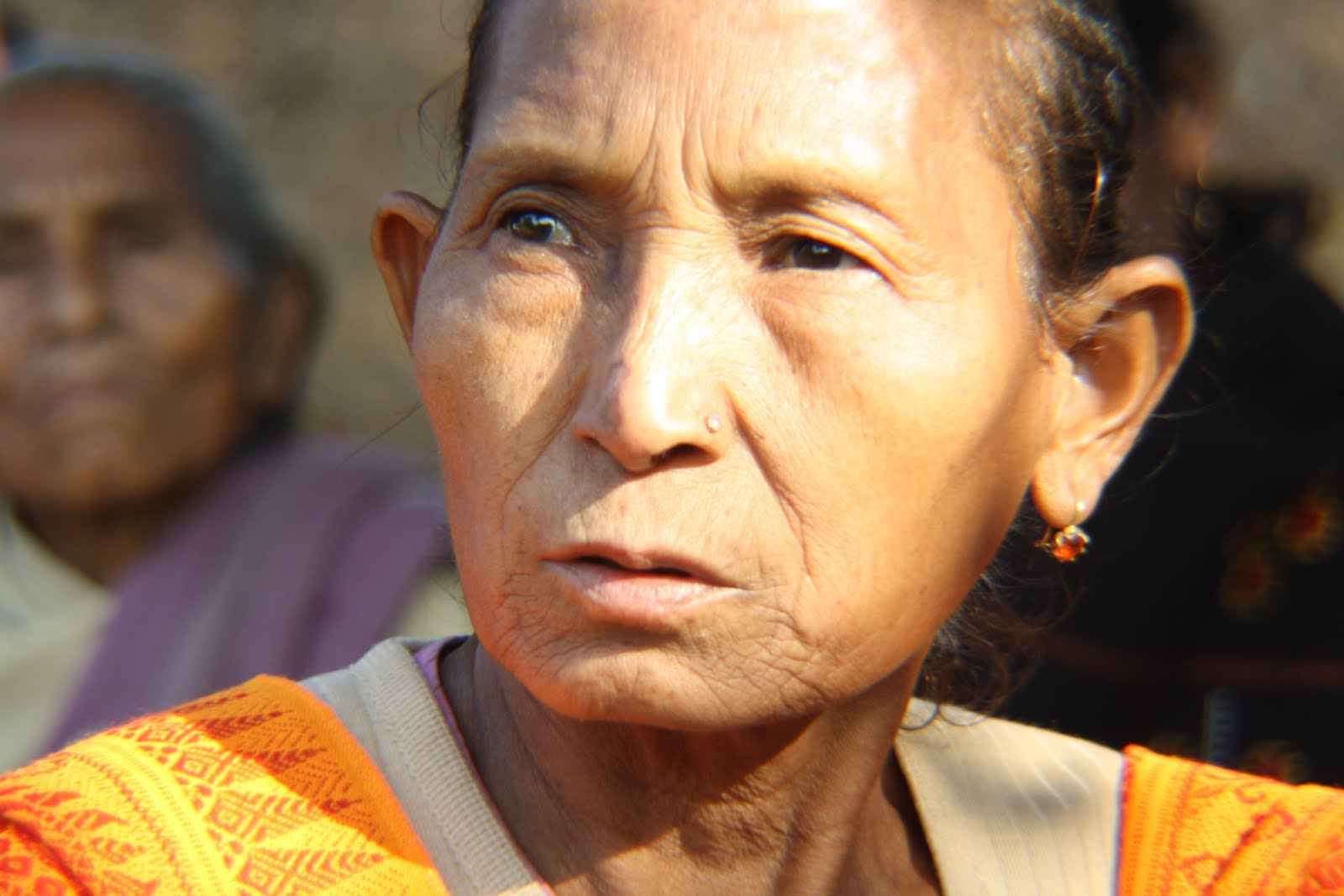
- Rabha in 2009
- Born: 1954; Thakurvila, Goalpara, Assam, India
- Died: 13 May 2024 (aged 70); Guwahati, Assam, India
- Occupation: Human rights activist
- Organisation: Mission Birubala

Birubala Rabha (1954 – 13 May 2024) was an Indian activist who campaigned against witch hunting in India. She was based in Goalpara, Assam. She ran an organisation called Mission Birubala which spreads awareness against witch hunting. She was instrumental in the Government of Assam passing the legislation on the prevention of and protection from witch hunting in 2015. The Government of India awarded her the fourth-highest civilian honour of the Padma Shri, in 2021, for her contributions to social work.

== Background ==
Rabha was born in 1954 in the village of Thakurvila, near the border of Meghalaya in Assam's Goalpara district. Her father died when she was six, forcing her to drop out of school and help her mother run the household. Rabha was fifteen when she was married to her husband, a farmer with whom she had three children.

In 1985, her mentally ill eldest son, Dharmeswar, suffered from a bout of typhoid, leading Rabha and her husband to take him to a village quack. They were told that he had been possessed by and had married a fairy, who was pregnant with his child and that as soon as this child was born he would die. According to the quack, Dharmeswar had only three days to live. However, he eventually recovered, living long after his diagnosis. After this incident, Rabha realised that the superstitions that led to the diagnosis of her son were baseless and stopped visiting quacks, who she believed were frauds.

== Activism ==
Initially, Rabha formed the Thakurvila Mahila Samity, a women's association raising awareness of various social ills, including witch-hunting in her local village, and later in 2006, became involved in the Assam Mahila Samata Society. In 2011, she founded Mission Birubala; a non-profit organisation made up of a network of social activists, survivors and lawyers; which aims to educate and spread awareness against witch-hunting, as well as support and protect survivors and potential victims of witch hunts across the state of Assam. Despite facing ridicule and attacks from those who defend the belief in witches, and being subjected to accusations of witchcraft herself, Rabha frequently spoke out against witch-branding and hunting at meetings, organised awareness camps and taught school lessons denouncing the practice. She also rescued over thirty-five women branded as witches in the last decade of her life.

In 2015, the activist's campaigning prompted the Assamese government to pass The Assam Witch Hunting (Prohibition Prevention and Protection) Act, which many consider to be India's toughest anti-witch-hunting law. The act, which came into effect in 2018, allows up to seven years in jail along with a substantial fine for identifying and branding a person as a witch, and extended the punishment for leading a person to commit suicide after accusing them of witchcraft to life imprisonment.

== Recognition ==
Rabha was recognised for her work against witch-hunting in Assam with numerous awards and accolades. In 2005, she was nominated for a Nobel Peace Prize by the North East Network (a women's rights organisation operating in Assam), and in 2015, was awarded an honorary Doctorate from Gauhati University. In 2021, she was recognised by the Indian government for her social work and campaigning with the Padma Shri, the fourth-highest civilian award in India.

== Death ==
Rabha died from oesophageal cancer at the State Cancer Institute, GMCH, on 13 May 2024, at the age of 70. (Note: Many news sources mislabel her age as "75".)
