= Witch hunts in Nepal =

Witch hunts are still occurring in Nepal in the twenty-first century, and the persecution of marginalised individuals of the community, especially women, still persists. Witchcraft is believed to be the exercise of supernatural powers by witches (Nepali: बोक्सी, romanized: Boksi). Although Nepal does not have a recorded history of systematic witch-hunts, belief in the supernatural, magic, and humans capable of exploiting both to do good or harm is pervasive. In many instances, witch-hunts are simply tribal scapegoating measures carried out to serve ulterior motives, such as getting revenge or winning property disputes.

The victims are usually poor elderly women, free-spirited young women, widows, women of lower castes, or any possible combination of the above. The perpetrators are usually neighbours or residents of the same village, and occasionally family or close relatives, usually armed with accusations from shamans or witch-doctors (tantrics). Politicians, teachers, police officers, army officers and other respected members of the community have also been implicated in various incidents.

Execution may be carried out by burning alive. Many victims succumb to their injuries from torture and assault. Non-murderous witch-hunts usually include beating and feeding of excrement, as it is believed that witches must follow a strict dietary regimen of purity to retain their magical powers.

== Overview ==
Witchcraft may be blamed in Nepali societies for material loss, sickness of cattle, and other problems, in addition to mental and physical illnesses in humans. It is also believed that witches can give deadly or chronic diseases by means of food or drinks. As such, suspected witches are completely marginalised from the community even if they have received no public accusations or violence. Facial hair or baldness in women, stooped posture, cantankerousness, garrulousness, red or yellow eyes, infertility, and talking to oneself are some of the characteristics that can get a person suspected or accused of witchcraft.

Mob violence (including killing) based on accusations of witchcraft, sometimes sanctioned by a committee of village elders, is prevalent. The accused may be paraded naked, with their faces blackened with soot or battery powder, and a garland of shoes around their neck, made to feed on excrement, shaved, beaten, tortured, and banished from the village. The accused may be made to put their hand on red-hot iron and inhale fumes from burning chillies. The most vulnerable group are the widows who may be accused of killing their own husbands using witchcraft. Such an accusation against a widow is almost always used as a means to prevent her from inheriting her husband's property. A significant number of victims are poor Dalit women. Witch-doctors play a key role in providing an authoritative accusation against the targeted victim in order to rouse the whole community to participate in the violence. It has been suggested that witch-hunts serve to discipline all women, preventing them from asserting their rights.

There is social stigma associated with reporting violence, and normalisation of violence as a way of life. The police are more likely to suggest reconciliation and altogether reject a complaint. Almost all perpetrators go unpunished unless there is a death, and victims are left without any remedial measures.

=== Prevalence ===
Nepal is featured prominently in media reports on witch-hunts. INSEC reported 52 incidents of witch-hunt related violence against women in 2012, 69 in 2013 and 89 in 2014. According to a study by UNFPA Nepal, 16% of the respondents in Nepal said it was all right to blame a woman as a witch.

== Efforts to combat the problem ==
The Government of Nepal, especially the Council of Ministers' Gender Empowerment Coordination Unit (GECU) actively seeks to combat the issues related to witch-hunts in Nepal, in collaboration with other ministries and (NWC). There are some NGOs that provide relief to victims as well, but their effectiveness is questionable. A shelter has been set up in Kathmandu for the victims of witch-hunts. Women's Rehabilitation Center (WOREC) and Women's Foundation of Nepal (WFN) are two prominent organisations working with victims of witch-hunt–related violence. Television programs, street, and stage plays have been created and performed by various artists and social organisations to spread awareness about the issue.

=== Legal status ===
The outdated Muluki Ain provision, in Miscellaneous Section 10(B), stipulated a fine ranging from Rs. 5,000 to Rs. 25,000 and jail-time ranging from three months to two years for violence committed by accusing someone of witchcraft.

The Anti-Witchcraft Act (2014) was specifically enacted to curb violence based on accusations of witchcraft, by introducing stringent measures. It stipulated fines not exceeding Rs 100,000 and up to 10 years in jail. In cases where the accusation was levelled based on the verdicts of tantriks (witch-doctors), the penalties were Rs 70,000 in fines and 7 years of jail. In addition, slandering the family members of the victim could incur fines of up to Rs 30,000 and up to three years of jail. If the perpetrator does not have the means to compensate the victim, the victim would be compensated through the Gender Violence Prevention Fund.

The Criminal Code Bill passed in 2017 stipulates penalties for inhuman treatment of an individual by accusing them of practising witchcraft. According to section 168 of the bill, the perpetrator of such an act could face up to five years in jail and up to Rs. 50,000 in fines to be granted as compensation to the victim. An additional three months of jail time is stipulated for perpetrators who happen to be a government employee at the time of the crime. In addition, the perpetrators would also be prosecuted for other charges relevant to the incident, such as torture, assault, and murder. This provision replaced the outdated Muluki Ain provision mentioned above.

== Timeline of reported incidents ==
The true extent of the prevalence is unknown as only a small fraction are reported. The increase in reports of witch-hunts in recent years may reflect an increase in awareness in Nepal. Many of the cases go unreported, especially when they occur in remote rural communities. In many cases, only those directly assaulting the victim are investigated by the police while in truth a whole community may be involved or the perpetrators may have been directed by their families, friends, or elders and in some cases a committee of village elders. The following is a non-exhaustive list of reported witch-hunt-related incidents in Nepal.

=== November 2009 ===
Thirty-year-old Jug Chaudhary of Kailali District in far western Terai was dragged from her home, beaten up in public, force-fed human excrement and paraded naked by members of her community including her relatives, in November 2009. She was accused of killing her mother-in-law's brother using witchcraft. According to Nepali Times which reported the incident, police declined to register a complaint, suggesting it was a personal matter to be resolved within the community.

=== February 2010 ===
According to a report by the Telegraph published on 15 February 2010, Kalli Bishwokarma, a 47-year old Dalit woman, was abducted by a group of 35 people from her own village and held for two days in a cowshed without food or water, and tortured. She was made to eat human feces and drink urine. She confessed to making a schoolteacher in her village sick using witchcraft, when the mob proceeded to peel her skin off after she had held off torture for two days.

=== 17 February 2012 ===
A forty-year-old widow, Dhegani Mahato of Chitwan District, was killed by burning alive after a shaman accused her of witchcraft. The execution was carried out by a mob including her relatives, after the shamans brought in to investigate the illness of one of her relatives accused her of keeping him sick. She was attacked with sticks and rocks in the early morning while she was performing her household chores. The mob proceeded to douse her in gasoline and set her on fire in front of her nine-year-old daughter. Ten people, which included a group of five women, an eight-year-old boy, and two shamans, were charged with murder. Eight of the accused were sentenced to life in prison.

=== 22 March 2012 ===
Sunita Pudasaini of Jorpati, Kathmandu, was attacked by her relatives including her siblings and blinded with a sickle on 22 March 2012. She was attacked when she was visiting her aunt. She was taken to Tilganga Eye Hospital for treatment. Six people were arrested in connection to the attack. The government also announced a cash support of Rs. 200,000 to the victim, in addition to all medical expenses.

=== 6 February 2013 ===
Forty-five-year-old Domani Chaudhary of Dhodana VDC-2, Siraha, was severely beaten by her neighbours over the death of a newborn in her village. Ramakanta Chaudhary, the father of the infant, allegedly roused her neighbours into beating her. She suffered severe injuries to the chest and head, and had to be admitted to the hospital. Her son and daughter were also injured when they tried to shield their mother. The perpetrators had fled the village before police action could be taken. All of the five accused were arrested on 9 February, but were released on bail 15 days later. A year later, Siraha district court sentenced all five to three months in prison and fines of Rs 5,000 each.

=== April 2013 ===
Sixty-year-old Rajkumari Rana was assaulted and tortured in April 2013 in Kailali District, in an act of vigilante justice sanctioned by the village council. She was stripped bare and had her head shaved. She was also badly beaten and made to feed on human excrement.

=== 15 August 2013 ===
On 15 August 2013, forty-five-year-old Parvati Devi Chaudhary of Supadi VDC was accused by a group of influential people in her village, and she and her husband were ordered to leave the village. They had agreed and were preparing to leave the next day. However, they were attacked the same night, and she was beaten to death. She was accused of witchcraft for the illness of a local girl. A group of people that included women, and one of the alleged masterminds Kari Kha had been arrested, while many others were still at large, as of 26 August. It was alleged that the police had refused to register the case the next day because it was a Saturday (public holiday) which had given opportunity to the accused to flee.

=== 9 December 2016 ===
Thirty-two-year-old Dalit woman Laxmi Pariyar of Kavre was found dead in her home on 13 December 2016, following a public torture and repeated assaults on 9 December 2016, by a group of people led by schoolteacher Hira Lama, in and near the premises of Suryodaya Secondary School in Sano Bangthali. On 9 December 2016, she was intercepted on her way back from a fair, by Hira Lama and his mother Kaili Tamang, and tied to a basketball pole with a rope. According to Pariyar's second son who was nine years old at the time and witnessed the whole event, Nirmaya Tamang, the shopkeeper who sold Lama the rope was also involved in the assault. In front of the villagers Lama had gathered to witness, he repeatedly beat Pariyar with a stick. He also kicked her on her chest. She was eventually force-fed human feces and untied. After she'd been helped away from the premises by her son, Lama again caught up with them and assaulted her a second time. Another witness said that the assault had occurred but it wasn't over an allegation of witchcraft.

It was later reported that she and her family had been continuously harassed by Lama leading up to the attack. Lama had beaten her brother-in-law in 2013. He had also made the family pay a fine of Rs. 6,000, along with an apology and a hundred sit-ups, by lodging a complaint to the police that she had hurt shopkeeper Tamang's buffalo, a case that had been settled just a day before she was found dead. Following her death, police reportedly arrested her husband who had reported the death as the main suspect. He reportedly confessed to beating her the previous night but denied his culpability in her death.

=== 13 April 2017 ===
Sixty-five-year-old Kusama Devi Yadav of Siraha was attacked inside her home and beaten by Shiva Nath Yadav and two others from her village. Her husband also sustained injuries trying to shield her. She was taken to a medical center for treatment after being rescued with the help of other villagers. Shiva Nath Yadav's daughter had been ill, for which he blamed the victim of witchcraft. The police promised to take action if the victim lodged a complaint.

=== 24 September 2017 ===
Raj Kumari Upadhaya, a woman's rights activist and chairperson of the District Women's Rights Forum, Parsa District, was assaulted in her home by a group of people including an officer of Nepal Armed Police Force. She was tortured for about two hours before she was rescued. According to the NGO Asian Human Rights Commission (AHRC), the police tried to hush up the incident as it involved one of their own but were forced to act through external pressures.

=== 30 December 2017 ===
The Kathmandu Post reported repeated assaults on Ritadevi Das of Siraha District in southern Nepal, by her neighbours Indradevi and her daughter Neelam Das. Ritadevi filed a complaint against her assailants when she was assaulted for the third time, the last assault having occurred on the night of 30 December 2017. Her neighbours reportedly suspected witchcraft because Ritadevi's husband had been bedridden for three years due to diabetes. The 36-year old victim had been supporting her sick husband and their three children with daily-wage labour.

=== 8 March 2018 ===
Eighteen-year-old Radha Chaudhary of Ghodaghodi was dragged from her home and tortured for six hours by a group led by a shaman, in front of hundreds of cheering onlookers, on 8 March 2018, International Women's Day. The victim had to be rushed to Seti Zonal Hospital. The police reportedly declined to register the complaint by the victim's family, instead advising them to seek community settlement and reconciliation, under pressure from the mayor and ward chair. The police were forced to take action when multiple NGOs and INGOs in the city exerted pressure on the city's law enforcement. Following his arrest, the shaman Bhole Baba reportedly apologised for breaking the law, affirming that he would stop "curing" the ill but would stay a "believer". The acting chief of the Area Police Office, Sukkad, Assistant Sub-inspector (ASI) Dinesh Bista, was later suspended for his attempt to reconcile the two sides instead of taking police action. Bhole Baba was fined Rs. 100,000 and sentenced to five years in jail, in June 2018. His accomplice, Kismati Chaudhary, was sentenced to one year and fined Rs. 50,000 while another accomplice, Smarika Chaudhary, was sentenced to six months and fined Rs. 25,000.

Chaudhary expressed her desire to become a woman's rights activist after her ordeal. She was fearful about the prospect of returning to her village. She finally returned home after several days of rehabilitation at the Women's Rehabilitation Center in Dhangadhi. She reported feeling ostracised by her classmates, friends, and neighbours even months after the incident. In November 2018, she was assaulted and tortured again, by another man, under the same accusation.

=== 22 May 2018 ===
Thirty-year-old Gita Devi Ram of Rautahat District in southern Nepal was beaten by members of her own family on the night of 22 May 2018 when a shaman accused her of keeping her sister-in-law's son sick. The parents and brothers of the sick boy, who had failed to recover from his illness after a year, assaulted his aunt, beating her indiscriminately on the night of 22 May.

=== 3 June 2018 ===
In Sunsari District of eastern Nepal, a faith healer was assaulted by a group of three brothers on 3 June 2018. They were carrying out instructions from their father, who suspected her of witchcraft when she was seen performing rituals in a nearby temple in an attempt to cure another sick woman. They were reportedly trying to force her to leave their village.

=== 14 November 2018 ===
A 73-year-old single woman from a remote village in Dhading District, Seti Maya Layo Magar, was thrashed and force-fed human excrement by a group of men led by a Nepal Army officer, on 14 November 2018, after three local shamans accused her of being the village witch. She had to be admitted to a hospital in Kathmandu. The main perpetrator, Dhan Bahadur Magar, a Nepal Army officer on leave, had brought in three shamans to investigate his ailment, after he had started feeling chest pain. The shamans identified Seti Maya as the culprit and accused her of trying to eat his heart. While she needed hospitalisation after the incident, she was threatened by the perpetrators, as well as the local leaders of political parties, against making a police report. A police complaint was only launched by the victim three days later. All four accused were arrested.

=== 18 August 2019 ===
A thirty-five-year-old woman was force-fed human feces by a group of five or six women in Birta village of Bangaha Municipality-4, Mahottari District, on 18 August 2019. The victim was taken to hospital for treatment and two of the alleged perpetrators were arrested the same day.

== Film ==
"Agnidahan" (2017) Dir. Gnanshyam Lamichhane

== See also ==
- Chhaupadi
- Human trafficking in Nepal
- Ghost Festival (Nepal)
- Modern witch-hunts
