= Harangul =

Village in Maharashtra

- village
- Location in Maharashtra, India Harangul (India)
- Coordinates: 18°54′0″N 76°40′0″E
- Country: India
- State: Maharashtra
- District: parbhani
- Elevation: 438 m (1,437 ft)

Languages
  - Official: Marathi
- Time zone: UTC+5:30 (IST)
- Vehicle registration: MH-
- Coastline: 0 kilometres (0 mi)

Harangul is a village in Parbhani district, Maharashtra, India.

== Geography ==
It is located at an average elevation 438 m above MSL.
