= Sonamai =

Coordinates: 26°50′N 85°49′E

Sonamai, Bhoil Timkiya सोनामाई ,भोईल
- Village development committee
- Motto(s): Religious, Cultural, Touristry Place
- Location in Nepal
- Country: Nepal
- Federal State: Province No. 2
- Zone: Janakpur Zone
- District: Mahottari District

Government
  - Type: government of Nepal Janakpur zone.... District =Mahottari VDC=Sonamai
- Elevation: 69 m (226 ft)

Population (2011)
  - Total: 8,973
- Time zone: UTC+5:45 (Nepal Time)
- Postal code: 45707
- Area code: 044
- Website: www.sonamai.com

Sonamai, सोनामाई is a village development committee in Mahottari District in the Janakpur Zone of south-eastern Nepal. At the time of the 2011 Nepal census it had a population of 8,973 people living in 1,662 individual households.

Sonamai has a substantial tourism industry due to its significance in Hinduism and being the place of Goddess.
