= Kangan Heri =

Village in Kapashera, Delhi, India

Coordinates: 28°32′48.54″N 76°59′17.76″E

Kanganheri village is a YADAV Land in Kapashera sub division of South West District in Delhi of the Indian state . It is located 12 km west of the District headquarters in kapashera. It is 9 km from Dwarka sub city and 1.5 km from Chhawla BSF camp.

== See also ==
- Najafgarh
- Dwarka
- Badusrai
