= Manpur, Bhopal =

Manpur
- village
- Location within Madhya Pradesh Location within India
- Coordinates: 23.225°N 77.826°E
- Country: India
- State: Madhya Pradesh
- District: Bhopal
- Tehsil: Berasia

Population (2011)
  - Total: 229
- Time zone: UTC+5:30 (IST)
- ISO 3166 code: IN-MP
- Census code: 482144

Manpur is a village in the Bhopal district of Madhya Pradesh, India. It is located in the Berasia tehsil.

== Demographics ==
According to the 2011 census of India, Manpur has 47 households. The effective literacy rate (i.e. the literacy rate of population excluding children aged 6 and below) is 40.22%.

Demographics (2011 Census)
	Total	Male	Female
Population	229	128	101
Children aged below 6 years	45	28	17
Scheduled caste	0	0	0
Scheduled tribe	0	0	0
Literates	74	48	26
Workers (all)	96	55	41
Main workers (total)	51	47	4
Main workers: Cultivators	24	23	1
Main workers: Agricultural labourers	27	24	3
Main workers: Household industry workers	0	0	0
Main workers: Other	0	0	0
Marginal workers (total)	45	8	37
Marginal workers: Cultivators	3	2	1
Marginal workers: Agricultural labourers	40	6	34
Marginal workers: Household industry workers	0	0	0
Marginal workers: Others	2	0	2
Non-workers	133	73	60
