= Boksi =

Person who has knowledge of witchcraft

A boksi (Nepali: बोक्सी) is a person who has knowledge of witchcraft, Tuna Muna and Tantra. According to Tantra-shastra and Shiva Purana, a boksi or boksa is a woman or man who is different from normal gods or goddesses and has their own language. Boksi has a divine power and is capable to heal various diseases. A Boksi is capable to differentiate god, goddess, ghosts, pret, pichas or dakini. They are able to call any of the goddess or witches and ask them to do a job for them. According to mythology, Parvati, the wife of Shiva was the originator of boksi knowledge. She gave this power to seven of her sisters. From the youngest sister, this knowledge is believed to be transferred to the humans.

Mostly elderly, unmarried or widowed women are the most likely to have been accused of being a boksi.

== In contemporary culture ==
- Boksi - a Nepali book on child psychology written by Balkrishna Sama.
- Boksi Ko Ghar (Translation: House of Boksi) - a Nepalese social drama film written by Sulakshyan Bharati, adapted from its own screeplay.
- Bokshi - an Indian folk-horror film directed by Bhargav Saikia.

== Legislation ==
According to Nepalese law, the person accusing someone a Boksi may be subjected to criminal offence and is liable to pay up to NPR 100,000 and a prison sentence of up to five years.

== See also ==
- Nepalese folklore
- Witch-hunts in Nepal
