= Dayan (witch) =

Type of witch in Indian culture

Dayan, Daayan, Ḍāin or Ḍāini is a malevolent spirit or ghost in Indian folklore, often of a woman who died under traumatic or unresolved circumstances (death in childbirth, murder). The term is often translated into English as "witch", though this translation can be misleading, as a daayan is typically understood as a vengeful supernatural spirit, rather than a living human practitioner of harmful magic (maleficium), and is therefore not equivalent to the Western concept of witchcraft. The term daayan has been derived from the Sanskrit word dakini, which refers to a female paranormal entity from patala (the netherworld). Dakinis have been described in medieval Hindu texts such as the Bhagavata Purana, Brahma Purana, Markandeya Purana and Kathasaritsagara as female fiendish spirits in the train of Kali who feed on human flesh.

Daayans have sometimes been compared to malevolent female spirits such as the succubi of Western folklore. They also resemble vampiresses based on their alleged feeding behaviours that require the blood or life-force of their victims. Powerful and older daayans are referred to as ekayans in some places. The primary source of a daayan's power is described as her unusually long braid (choti), that is used as an additional limb, which can be flexed, stretched, retracted and regenerated to do whatever the daayan pleases. The daayan is also described as having long and monstrous black nails, and feet that face backwards. It is said that once a daayan lays her evil eye on someone, it is a bad omen for the whole household of that person. Daayans are regarded as one of the most powerful paranormal beings in Indian folklore.

== History ==
Although daayans are described as supernatural beings in folklore, the term daayan along with churel has also been used in some contexts in a few places to label women for causing misfortune, leading to its association with witchcraft accusations. The daayan cult refers to a secret society which emerged during the 15th century in Harangul, a village in the Parbhani district of Maharashtra. The concept of daayans has permeated Indian culture, and may be seen on popular television programs. Belief in daayans has existed in many regions of India, particularly in Jharkhand and Bihar. "'Victims of witch-hunting are usually old or widowed women. These women are victimized for their property, or due to problems in the family or for sexual exploitation" says Vasvi Kiro, a member of the Jharkhand State Commission for Women. The legend is prevalent in rural and semi-rural areas, with "witch-hunts" causing women to be killed or ostracised.

In Harangul it is believed that daayans live in an area of the village, and that an evil spirit resides within them. Villagers believe these women destroy everything that is good. Daayans are allegedly found in and around cemeteries, abandoned battlefields, crossroads, toilets and squalid places.

== Folklore ==
Folklore suggests that a woman who suffered immense cruelty, often in the form of sexual violence and brutal murder returns as a daayan, haunting the family and drinking the blood of male family members. Beginning with the youngest male in the family, draining his blood changes him into an old man before she progresses to the other men.

A daayan is also said to target young families, young women and other family surrogates. Assuming the form of a young, attractive female, she hunts for young men on roads and seduces lone travellers into accompanying her. Imprisoning a man, she feeds on his age and blood. One legend says that a daayan will hold a young man captive until he is old, using him sexually until he dies and joins the spirit world. Another says that a young man seduced by the daayan who eats her food returns at dawn to the village as an old man.

Some women are believed to be daayans, and (along with young children) are sometimes tortured and killed in rural areas. Witchcraft is a major social problem in Jharkhand, a large number of women are accused as witches and are killed. The state is known for an indigenous religion called Sarna. Similar to the puritan society of the 17th century, women here are not treated as equal to men. Hence single women, especially widows, are easy targets of witchcraft accusations.

Daayans worship evil, "black magic spirits". Many believe they are the handmaidens of goddesses, and are known as yoginis in local lore. The word daayan is used in many Hindi films, short films, Indian and Pakistani TV serials as well as in social media to refer to a woman who does things that are not for the good cause or promote evil in society.

== Differences between Daayans and Churels ==
Daayan is sometimes used interchangeably with the term churel (Hindi: चुड़ैल cuṛail), although conceptual and cultural differences exist between them. A churel is a vengeful ghost that arises from the death of a woman during pregnancy or childbirth, with preternatural powers similar to a witch. Whereas a Daayan is a vengeful, malevolent, black-magic performing ghost of a woman who suffered a traumatic death (raped, brutally murdered or even neglectful death during childbirth). Indian witch stories vary across the country; the north Indian states believe that the churel (which lives near graveyards or in forests) can change its form and lure young men, whom they will kill if they have physical contact with them. While in the western and eastern parts of India, it is believed that a churel looks like an old hag who lures small children away from their families to kill and eat them so as to keep herself younger.
