= Josef Friedrich Wilhelm, Prince of Hohenzollern-Hechingen =

Prince of Hohenzollern-Hechingen (1717–1798)

Josef Friedrich Wilhelm
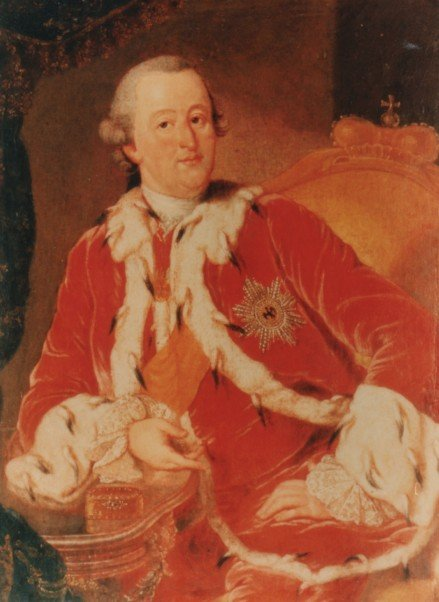
- 18th century portrait

Prince of Hohenzollern-Hechingen
- Reign: 4 June 1750 – 9 April 1798
- Predecessor: Frederick Louis
- Successor: Hermann
- Born: 12 November 1717; Bayreuth
- Died: 9 April 1798 (aged 80); Hechingen
- Spouse: Princess Maria Theresia Folch de Cardona y Silva; Countess Maria Theresia of Waldburg-Zeil
- Issue: Meinrad; Joseph; Maria Crescentia; Maria Theresia; Hieronymus; Maria Antonia
Names
- German: Josef Friedrich Wilhelm
- House: House of Hohenzollern-Hechingen
- Father: Count Herman Frederick of Hohenzollern-Hechingen
- Mother: Countess Maria Josepha Theresia of Oettingen-Spielberg

Josef Friedrich Wilhelm (born 12 November 1717 in Bayreuth; died 9 April 1798 in Hechingen), was prince of Hohenzollern-Hechingen from 1750 until his death.

== Life ==
Prince Josef Friedrich Wilhelm, Officer in Imperial Service, was the son of Imperial field Marshal Herman Friedrich of Hohenzollern-Hechingen and Josepha von Oettingen zu Spielberg. He succeeded his unmarried cousin, Frederick Louis, in 1750.
On 25 June 1750 in Vienna, Josef married Princess Maria Theresia Folch de Cardona y Silva, the 18-year-old only daughter of Francisco Manuel Folch de Cardona y Silva, 2nd Reichsfürst of Cardona and 6th Marqués del Aguila. Maria Theresia died only three months into the marriage and left behind her family's fortune in its entirety. Marriages in the House of Hohenzollern-Hechingen were often chosen based on dowry and inheritance.

In 1751, Josef married Countess Maria Theresia of Waldburg-Zeil who bore him six children, of which only the youngest daughter grew past childhood.

Josef Friedrich Wilhelm pursued a career in the Habsburg Army, and reached the rank of Feldmarschallleutnant in 1757, General of the cavalry in 1758 and Generalfeldmarschall in 1787.

Josef was an enthusiastic hunter and traveler. In 1764, during a stay in Bad Wildbad, he became acquainted with a Prussian Stabskapitän who had been released from the Prussian army after the end of the Seven Years' War. This man was Friedrich Wilhelm von Steuben (1730–1794), who would spend the next 12 years as Hofmarschall in Josef's service before his role assisting George Washington in the Revolutionary War as General Inspector and Organizer of the United States Army.

Steuben was also involved when the prince began to implement money-saving or money-creating policies. These include his attempt in 1772 to dissolve the court and to travel incognito with only his wife and Steuben accompanying him. He stayed for extended periods of time in Strasbourg, Montpellier, and Lyon. Josef spent much of his money and time with company, fine dining, gambling, theater, carnival, and hunting. This continued for three full years, until the princess succeeded in convincing the prince to end his masquerade.

In the following years, Josef became comfortable in the position of an enlightened leader; he promoted agriculture and established compulsory education. In 1775, he founded a Gymnasium (roughly equivalent to the American high school) as well as a Latin school in the "Old Castle", and contributed to the reduction of churchly holidays despite resistance from the population. He was considered to be tolerant towards Protestants and Jews.

His need for representation led to the establishment of the Collegiate church in Hechingen. In 1764, the well-renowned French architect Pierre Michel d’Ixnard was hired as the director of this construction project. The architect was also involved in renovating the Friedrichsburg castle in Hechingen.

Although the prince intended to always appear as a friendly father-figure for his people, he was relentless in conflicts with his subjects and was always distrustful of his potential successors. On 9 April 1798, Josef died after 48 years of reigning.

Because he had no male successors, the crown passed to his nephew Hermann.

== Issue ==
Josef Friedrich Wilhelm and his second wife Countess Maria Theresia of Waldburg-Zeil zu Wurzach had six children, of which only the youngest daughter grew past childhood :

- Meinrad Joseph Maria Friedrich Erbgraf von Hohenzollern-Hechingen (* 9 October 1751, Hechingen; † 28 September 1752, Hechingen)
- Joseph Wilhelm Franz Erbgraf von Hohenzollern-Hechingen (* 12 December 1752, Hechingen; † 7 July 1754, Hechingen)
- Maria Crescentia Josepha Gräfin von Hohenzollern-Hechingen (* 4 September 1754, Hechingen; † 29 September 1754)
- Maria Theresia Josephine Karoline Gräfin von Hohenzollern-Hechingen (* 3 December 1756, Hechingen; † December 1756)
- Hieronymus Joseph Karl Erbgraf von Hohenzollern-Hechingen (* 18 April 1758, Hechingen; † 23 June 1759, Hechingen)
- Maria Antonia Anna Gräfin von Hohenzollern-Hechingen (* 10 November 1760, Hechingen; † 25 July 1797, Hechingen) married in 1778 to Prince Joseph Maria, Prince of Fürstenberg (1758-1796)

== Bibliography ==
- Philipp Matthäus Hahn: Kurze Beschreibung einer kleinen beweglichen Welt-MACHINE, welche Sr. Hochfürstl. Durchlaucht dem regierenden Fürsten [Joseph Friedrich Wilhelm] zu Hohenzollern Hechingen unter der DIRECTION des Pfarrers M[agistri]. Hahns von Onstmettingen von dem Schulmeister Schaudten [i. e. Philipp Gottfried Schaudt] daselbst verfertiget worden. 1770. [Vignette] Gedruckt zu Constanz bey Johann Gerhard Lüdolph.
- Jürgen Brüstle: Friedrich Wilhelm von Steuben – Eine Biographie. Marburg 2006.
- Ludwig Egler: Chronik der Stadt Hechingen. 1889. S. 158-167.
- Gustav Schilling: Geschichte des Hauses Hohenzollern, in genealogisch fortlaufenden Biographien aller seiner Regenten von den ältesten bis auf die neuesten Zeiten, nach Urkunden und andern authentischen Quellen. F. Fleischer, 1843, pp. 245 ff.
- E. G. Johler: Geschichte, Land- und Ortskunde der souverainen teutschen Fürstenthümer Hohenzollern, Hechingen und Sigmaringen. 1824, pp. 58 ff. (Digitalisat)

== Notes ==
Josef Friedrich Wilhelm, Prince of Hohenzollern-Hechingen House of Hohenzollern-Hechingen Cadet branch of the House of Hohenzollern Born: 12 November 1717 Died: 9 April 1798
Regnal titles
Preceded by Frederick Louis	Prince of Hohenzollern-Hechingen; 4 June 1750 – 9 April 1798	Succeeded by Hermann
