= Friedrich Ludwig, Prince of Hohenzollern-Hechingen =

- Born: 1 September 1688; Strasbourg
- Died: 4 June 1750 (aged 61); Lindich Castle in Hechingen
- Noble family: House of Hohenzollern
- Father: Friedrich Wilhelm
- Mother: Maria Ludovica Leopoldine of Sinzendorf

Friedrich Ludwig of Hohenzollern-Hechingen (1 September 1688 in Strasbourg – 4 June 1750 at Lindich Castle in Hechingen) was prince of Hohenzollern-Hechingen.

Friedrich Ludwig was a son of Prince Friedrich Wilhelm of Hohenzollern-Hechingen (1663–1735), and his wife Countess Maria Ludovica Leopoldine of Sinzendorf (1666–1709). His childhood and youth were spent in his parents' Renaissance castle in Hechingen. After his military training, Friedrich Ludwig became a passionate hunter and soldier. He was an imperial Field Marshal and Commander-in-Chief of the Austrian army on the Upper Rhine. He fought under Prince Eugene of Savoy in the Austro-Turkish War of 1716–1718 and against Hungarian rebels.

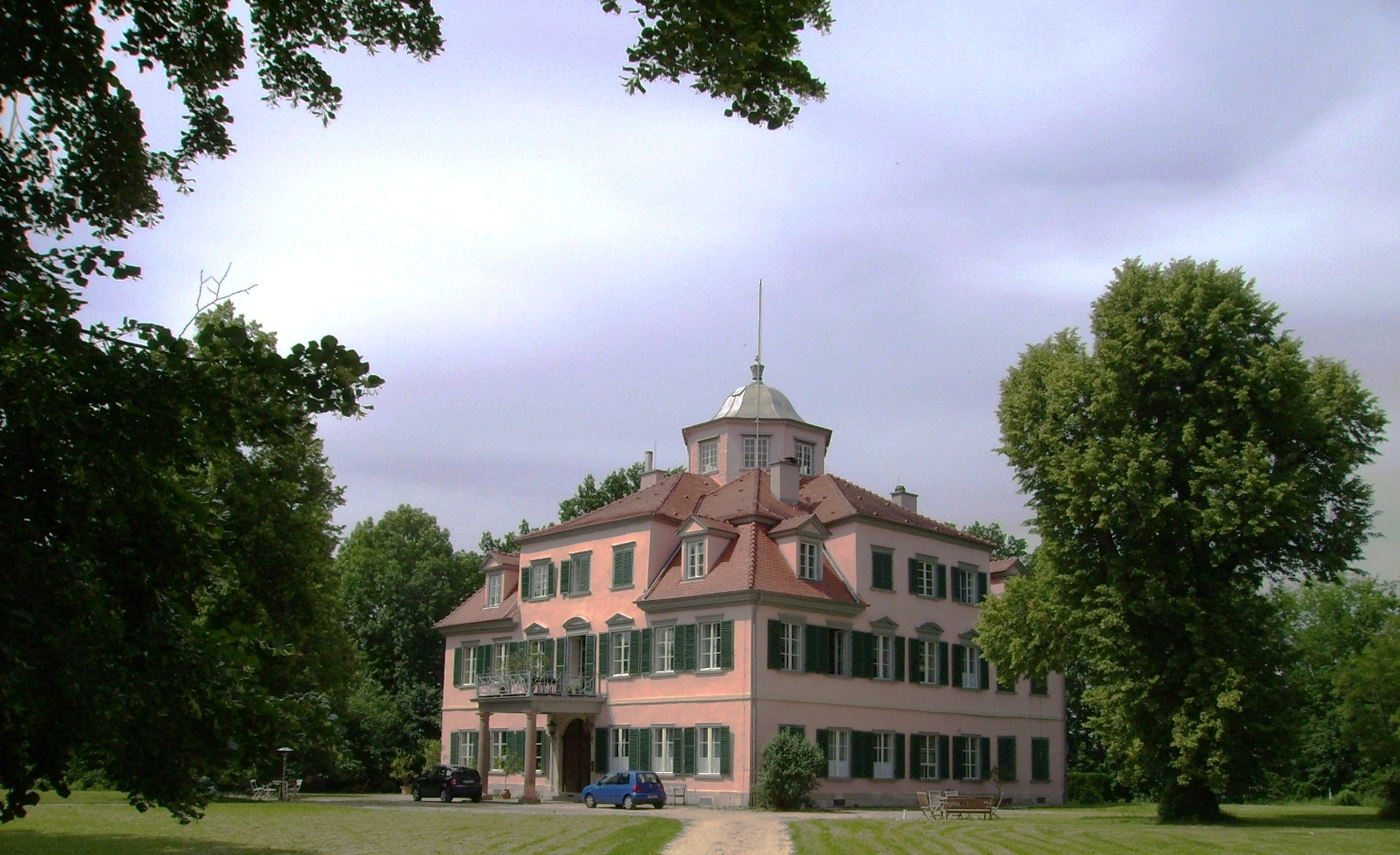
Lindich Castle was built at the instigation of Friedrich Ludwig

In 1730, his father abdicated as Prince of Hohenzollern-Hechingen and Friedrich Ludwig took over. His passion for hunting led him to construct a Jagdschloss and summer residence, despite the principality's awkward financial situation. The architecturally outstanding Lindich Castle was constructed between 1739 and 1741, three kilometers west of Hechingen. He also built Jagdschloss Friedrichstal, southeast of Boll (now a suburb of Hechingen). These construction projects worsened the principality's financial problems and led to confrontations with his subjects. Friedrich Ludwig died at Lindich Castle on 4 June 1750. He was unmarried and childless. His successor was his cousin Josef Friedrich Wilhelm.

Friedrich Ludwig, Prince of Hohenzollern-Hechingen House of Hohenzollern Born: 1 September 1688 Died: 4 June 1750
Preceded by Friedrich Wilhelm	Prince of Hohenzollern-Hechingen; 1730–1750	Succeeded by Josef Friedrich Wilhelm
