= Friedrich Hermann Otto, Prince of Hohenzollern-Hechingen =

Friedrich Hermann Otto
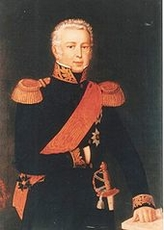
- Portrait by an unknown artist, c. 1810-1838

Prince of Hohenzollern-Hechingen
- Reign: 2 November 1810 – 13 September 1838
- Predecessor: Hermann
- Successor: Constantine
- Born: 22 July 1776; Namur
- Died: 13 September 1838 (aged 62); Schloss Lindich, Hechingen
- Spouse: Luise Pauline Maria Biron
- Issue: Constantine
Names
- German: Friedrich Hermann Otto
- House: Hohenzollern-Hechingen
- Father: Hermann, Prince of Hohenzollern-Hechingen
- Mother: Princess Maximiliane of Gavre

Friedrich Hermann Otto of Hohenzollern-Hechingen (born 22 July 1776 in Namur; died 13 September 1838 at Schloss Lindich in Hechingen) was the penultimate Prince of Hohenzollern-Hechingen. Friedrich was the only child of Hermann, Prince of Hohenzollern-Hechingen (1751–1810) and his wife Princess Maximiliane of Gavre (1753 or 1755 – 1778). From 1806 to 1812, he fought on the French side in the Napoleonic Wars and was severely wounded in the 1812 Russian campaign.

He ordered the demolishing of the Friedrichsburg castle in 1812 in order to replace it with the Neues Schloss in Hechingen

A portrait of Otto by German engraver Carl Ermer is held in the Royal Collection Trust.

== Marriage and issue ==
Friedrich married Princess Pauline Biron von Kurland, Princess of Sagan (1782–1845) in Prague on 26 April 1800. Friedrich and Luise had one child:

- Constantine, Prince of Hohenzollern-Hechingen (16 February 1801 – 3 September 1869)

∞ Eugénie de Beauharnais, no issue.
∞ Baroness Amalie Schenk von Geyern, issue.

Friedrich Hermann Otto, Prince of Hohenzollern-Hechingen House of Hohenzollern-Hechingen Cadet branch of the House of Hohenzollern Born: 22 July 1776 Died: 13 September 1838
Regnal titles
Preceded by Hermann	Prince of Hohenzollern-Hechingen; 2 November 1810 – 13 September 1838	Succeeded by Constantine
