= Friedrichsburg (Hechingen) =

Former palace in Hechingen, Germany

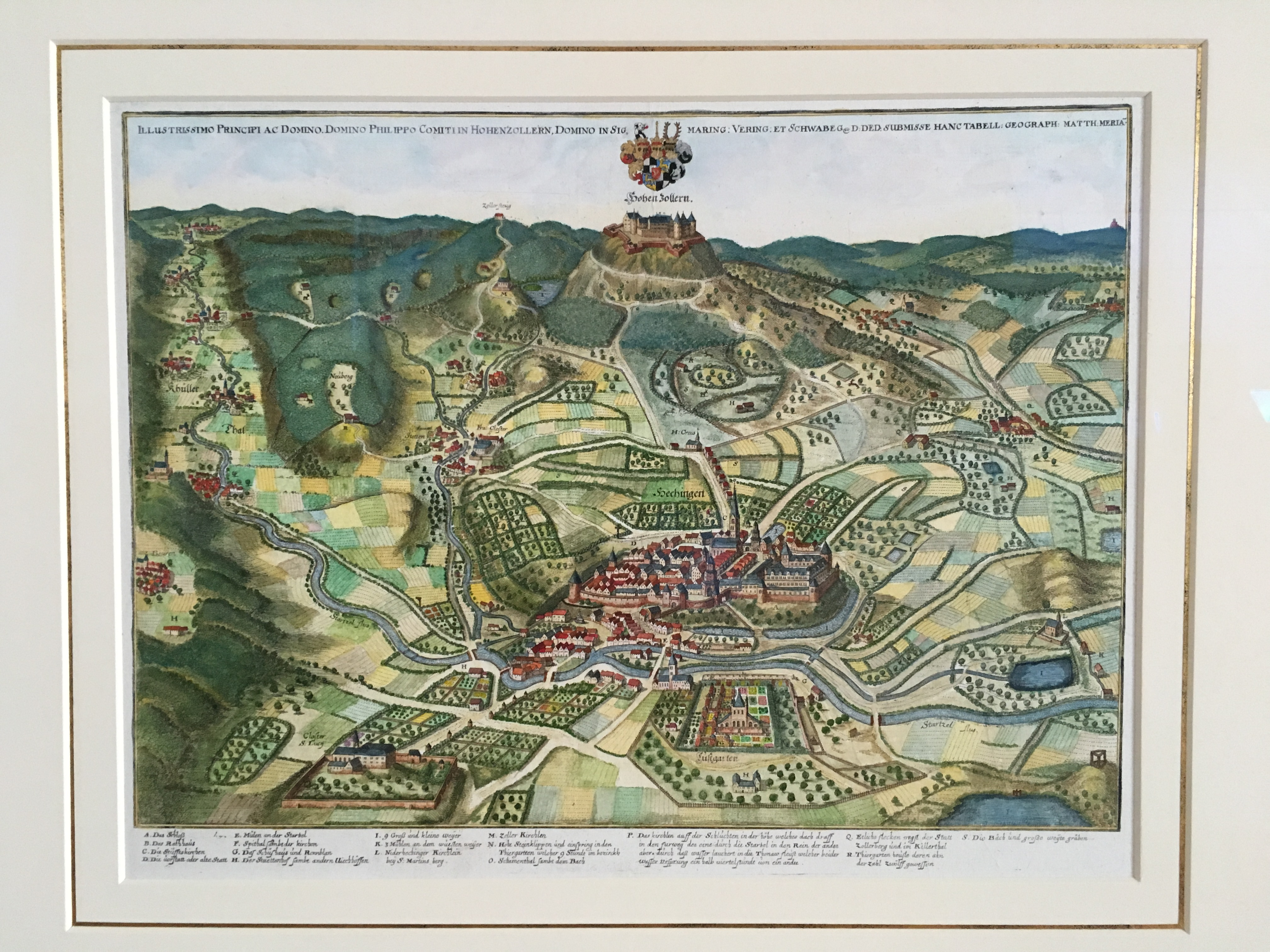
Hechingen with the Friedrichsburg, and Hohenzollern Castle around 1643 by Matthäus Merian

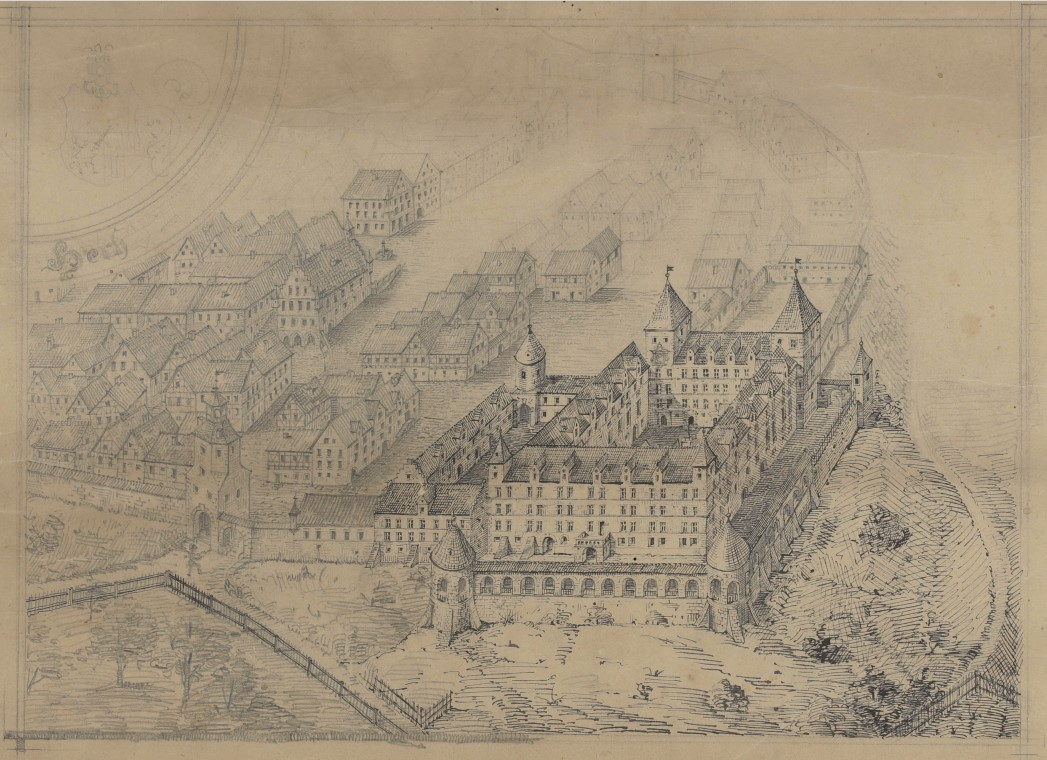
Friedrichsburg at the start of the 17th century

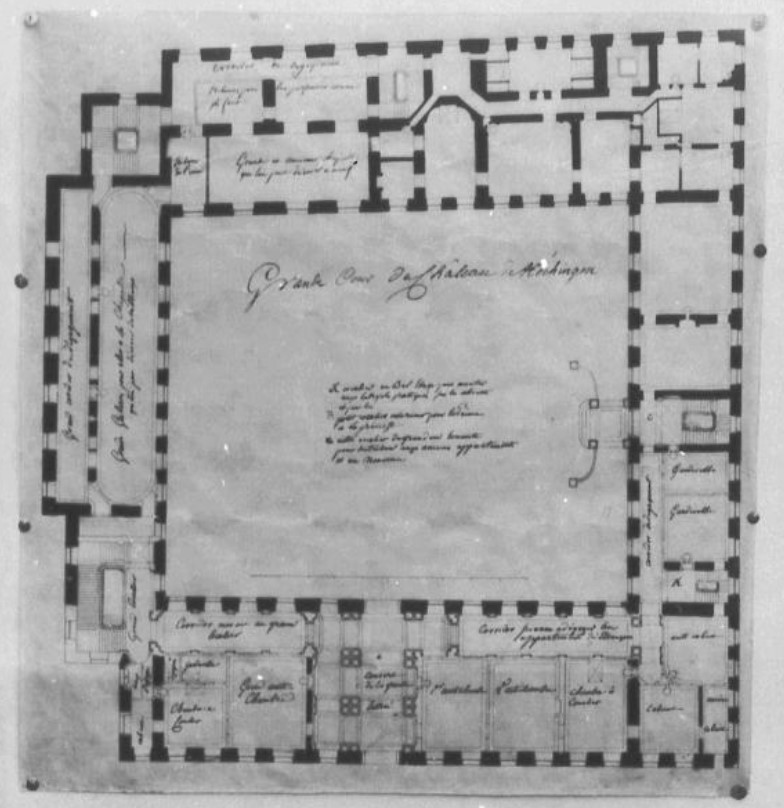
Floor plan (ground?) of the Friedrichsburg by Pierre Michel d'Ixnard (north wing to the right)

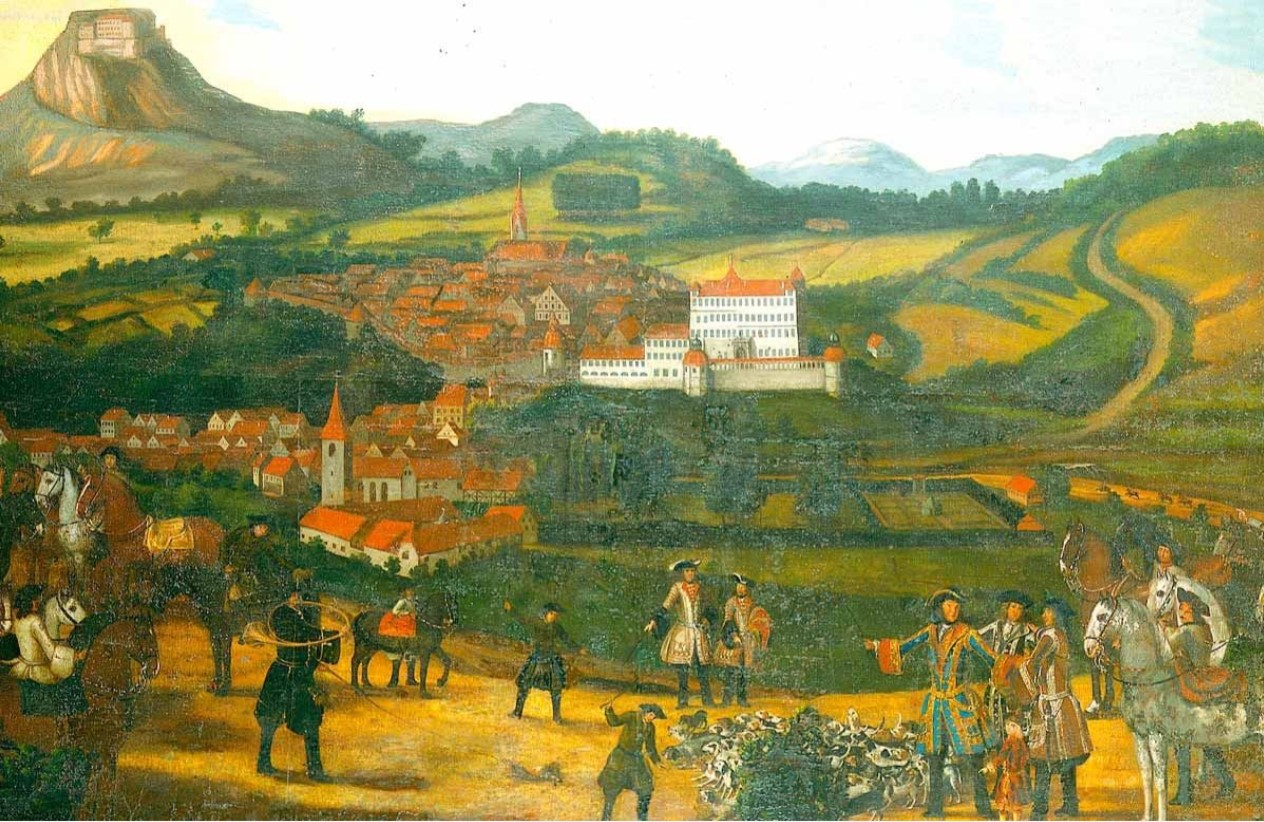
Hunting party in front of Hechingen and Friedrichsburg castle around 1740

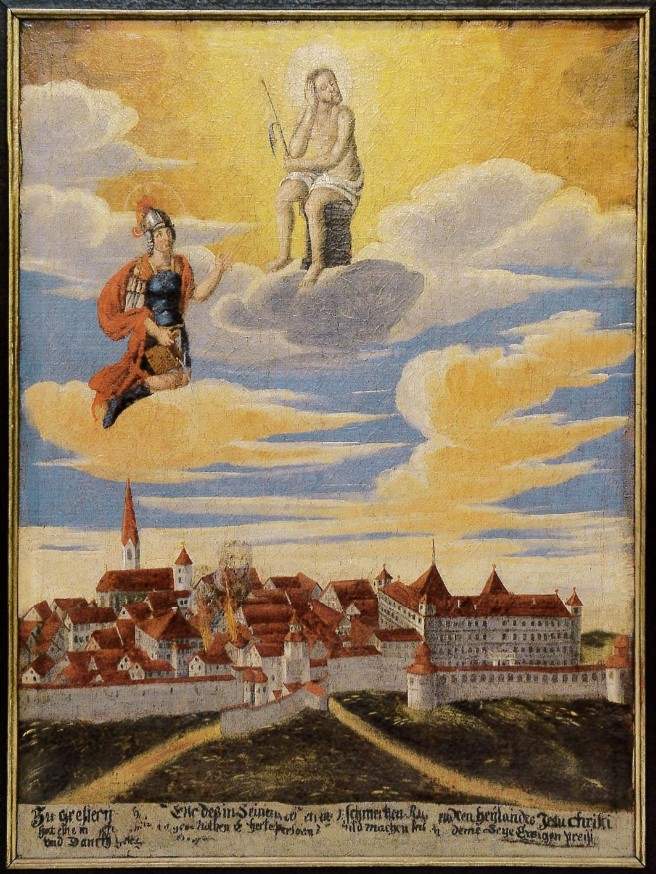
Votiv picture showingen Hechingen and Friedrichsburg in 1723

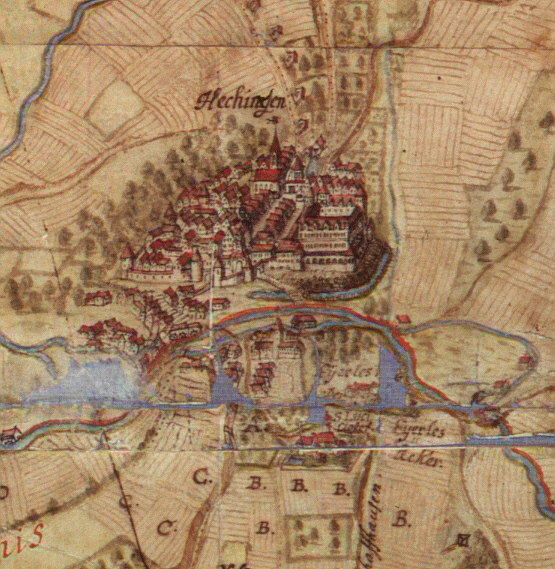
Hechingen in 1716

Friedrichsburg Castle (German: Schloss Friedrichsburg) was a princely castle in renaissance style, situated in Hechingen, within the state of Baden-Württemberg, Germany. It was the residence of the princes of Hohenzollern-Hechingen. At the start of the nineteenth century, the castle was demolished and replaced by the ‘Neues Schloss’. Today, nothing remains anymore of the Friedrichsburg.

== History ==
After the division of Hohenzollern in 1576, Eitel Frederick IV, Count of Hohenzollern (1545-1605) decided to build a castle in Hechingen, which he named Friedrichsburg. Construction lasted from 1577 to 1595. Master builders Jörg Schwartzenbergers and Esaias Grubers were involved in the design.

Between 11 and 15 October 1598, the castle was the setting for an opulent wedding that Eitel Frederick IV organized for his son Johann Georg, Prince of Hohenzollern-Hechingen (1577-1623) and Franziska von Salm-Neufville. Around 1,000 guests came to Hechingen for a week-long celebration, including 200 nobles. The margrave of Baden alone travelled with 300 horses. The wedding festivities included the wedding in the palace chapel and a wedding banquet, but also dance events, hunts, gift presentations. The wedding has been immortalized in a poem by the poet Jakob Frischlin (1557-1621).

During the 18th century, prince Josef Friedrich Wilhelm (1717-1798) decided to reconstruct the Friedrichsburg. He engaged the French architect Pierre Michel d'Ixnard (1723-1795) to execute the renovations between 1764 and 1768. It is mentioned that a theater was constructed and a princely cabinet. There is even a plan by d'Ixnard to create a whole new baroque wing for the palace, however this was not realized.

At the start of the nineteenth century, the castle had become dilapidated. The east wing collapsed in 1812. Prince Friedrich Hermann Otto (1776-1838) decided to demolish the Friedrichsburg in 1814 and replace it by a new residence. The decision was motivated by French reparation funds received from the Congress of Vienna. The ‘Neues Schloss’ was built between 1818 and 1819 basis a design from the architect Rudolf Burnitz. The new palace was never finished as the funds were not sufficient and the principality was in debt. The state museum of Hohenzollern, the 'Hohenzollerisches Landesmuseum', located in Hechingen, created a virtual reconstruction of the Friedrichsburg in 2007. It is displayed in the museum to give its visitors an impression how the destroyed castle looked like.

== Architecture ==
Schloss Friedrichsburg was a quadrangular castle in renaissance style, similar to Schloss Heiligenberg and Schloss Zeil, near Leutkirch im Allgäu . It was located in the north western corner of the Hechingen city center.

Very little is known about the exact dimensions and interior of the castle. There is a blueprint remaining of one of the castle's floors (ground?), drawn by the architect Pierre Michel d'Ixnard. It is estimated that the castle area was approximately 100 times 150 metres, and that the sides of the main building were 75 metres long.

There are various engravings and paintings showing the castle's exterior, the most famous one being the city view of Hechingen by Merian. And there are some written contemporary descriptions and bills from craftspeople who worked at the construction of the castle.

The castle contained more than 127 rooms. As in Schloss Heiligenberg, a wing (east) was entirely taken up by a large hall on its two upper floors. The ballroom was decorated with a rich carved coffered ceiling (created in 1579), and two magnificent fireplaces on its narrow sides (constructed in 1580) . Also, the palace chapel within the south wing (built at the start of the 1590s) was probably very similar to Schloss Heiligenberg. At the center of the chapel was a large high altar, most of its images have been preserved in the parish church of the neighboring village of Jungingen. On the chapel walls, there were seven Stations of the Cross by the sculptor Joachim Taubenschmid. Some of the stations have been preserved and are shown in the Hohenzollerisches Landesmuseum.

== Literature ==
- Hossfeld, Friedrich; Vogel, Hans; Genzmer, Walther (1939). Die Kunstdenkmäler Hohenzollerns erster Band: Kreis Hechingen (in German). Hechingen: Holzer.
- Werner, Otto (March 1986). "Von der Schlosskirche oder Hofkapelle in der Friedrichsburg zu Hechingen". Hohenzollerische Heimat (in German). 36–1. Hohenzollerischen Geschichtsverein: 1–3.
- Merten, Klaus (1987). Schlösser in Baden-Württemberg (in German). München: Verlag C.H. Beck. pp. 122–123. ISBN 3406323073.
- Schmitt, Günter (2007). Burgen, Schlösser und Ruinen im Zollernalbkreis (in German). Ostfildern: Thorbecke Verlag. pp. 233–243. ISBN 9783799501866.
- Kuchar, R; Schairer, T; Strasser, W (2007). "Photorealistic Real-Time Visualization of Cultural Heritage: A Case Study of Friedrichsburg Castle in Germany" (PDF). Eurographics: 9–16. doi:10.2312/egch.20071002.
- Trugenberg, Volker (2012). "Hechingen". In Paravicini, Werner (ed.). Höfe und Residenzen im spätmittelaterlichen Reich Grafen und Herren Teilband 1 (in German). Ostfildern: Jan Thorbecke Verlag. pp. 643–644. ISBN 978-3799545259.
