= Hermann, Prince of Hohenzollern-Hechingen =

Hermann
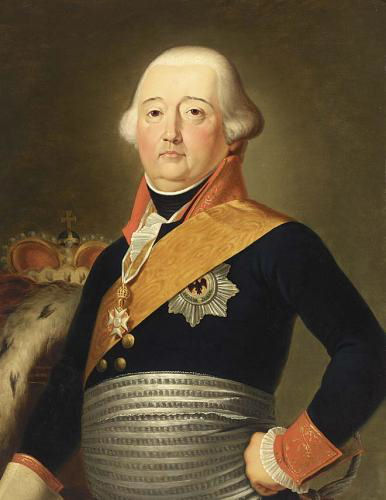

Prince of Hohenzollern-Hechingen
- Reign: 9 April 1798 – 2 November 1810
- Predecessor: Josef Friedrich Wilhelm
- Successor: Friedrich Hermann Otto
- Born: 30 July 1751; Lockenhaus (Léka), Vas County, Kingdom of Hungary
- Died: 2 November 1810 (aged 59); Hechingen, Hohenzollern-Hechingen
- Spouse: Countess Louise of Merode-Westerloo (m. 1773; died 1774) Princess Maximiliane of Gavre (m. 1775; died 1778) Princess Maria Antonia of Waldburg-Zeil-Wurzach (m. 1779; died 1810)
- Issue: Princess Luise; Friedrich Hermann Otto; Princess Maria Antonia; Princess Maria Theresia; Princess Franziska Theresia; Princess Maria Maximiliane; Princess Josephine
Names
- German: Hermann Friedrich Otto
- House: House of Hohenzollern-Hechingen
- Father: Count Franz Xaver of Hohenzollern-Hechingen
- Mother: Countess Anna Maria of Hoensbroech-Geulle

Hermann Friedrich Otto (30 July 1751 – 2 November 1810) was the ruling Prince of Hohenzollern-Hechingen from 1798 until 1810.

== Early life ==
He was raised in Belgium, where his father, Count Franz Xaver of Hohenzollern-Hechingen, was an imperial officer. From his mother, Countess Anna Maria of Hoensbroech-Geulle, Prince Hermann inherited his Dutch holdings. Hermann succeeded his uncle Josef Friedrich Wilhelm as Prince in 1798.

== Career ==
After the transfer of the left bank of the Rhein to France as part of war reparations, he tried to find money for the beautification of Hechingen and the improvement of roads. All of his activities served to increase the fortune of his House.

Prince Hermann was an Imperial-Field Marshal General and a Prussian Lieutenant General. The situation of the princedom between the time of the Second Congress of Rastatt and the end of the Empire, the Prince's debut was actually quite relaxed. Soon after his ascension to power, he held peace talks with the local land holders, and came to a mutual agreement June, 1795 in Hechingen with the local land holders. He then disbanded "the daily joyful homage festivals from a couple of free movements of all subjects of bondage. The village of Bisingen missed out on this because it would not enter into the agreement. In addition the village would not pay homage" (since that time the Bisingers carry the nickname "Nichthuldiger“ meaning those who do not pay homage.) The prince confined his hunts to three of his lands, outside of these lands, animals could be hunted by the peasants. The lands not within set borders were parceled out or sold. The serfdom, as far as legal dependents protected by the prince was concerned, was abolished. This weighed heavily upon them, however. The monarchy was appointed five percent of the estate.

The subjects obtained the right, in to appoint representatives by general election. These representatives would have the right to control taxes and the right to make to represent the common people. The prince gave Jews, upon the suggestion of his Jewish adviser, Jakob Kaulla (see also Karoline Kaulla) permission to reside in his princedom for forty years in exchange for remuneration to the high chamber. The prince succeeded in the settlement of the conflicts with his subjects within a few short weeks.

Prince Hermann was not generally a man of compromise, he was a bizarre personality, his nature was suspicious and that of a micro-manager; he concerned himself with the external details of administration. He loved, according to the prevailing taste of the time, being alone in nature, particularly in his hunting lodge at Friedrichsthal. He was a businesslike, vigilant patriarch who managed to enjoy one last high point of princely absolutism. The Confederation of the Rhine Acts rescued the independent existence of the Hechinger Princes, however he was in no way given an extension of power, neither based on landowner nor on rights of sovereignty. He perceived this as an affront and as discrimination against him, the eldest line of his House. Prince Hermann Friedrich was reportedly deeply afflicted by the humiliation of Prussia and Austria.

== Personal life ==
Prince Hermann Friedrich Otto was married three times. His first spouse, Countess Louise of Merode-Westerloo, died after only one year of marriage. From his second wife, Princess Maximiliane of Gavre, Marquise d'Aysseau, he inherited one billion Francs. In 1779, Prince Hermann married his third wife, the Countess Maria Antonia of Waldburg-Zeil zu Wurzach.

=== First marriage ===
On 18 November 1773, he married Countess Louise of Merode-Westerloo (1747–1774), the daughter of Jean Guillaume von Merode-Westerloo and Princess Eleonore Louise Constance of Rohan-Rochefort. Before her death, they were the parents of one daughter:

- Princess Luise Juliane Konstantine (1774–1846), who married Baron Ludwig Heer von der Burg in 1806.

=== Second marriage ===
On 15 February 1775, he married Princess Marie Maximiliane of Gavre (1753–1778), daughter of Charles I Alexandre, 1st Prince de Gavre and Baroness Marie Amour Désirée de Rouveroit. Before her death in 1778, they were the parents of one son:

- Friedrich Hermann Otto, Prince of Hohenzollern-Hechingen (1776–1838), who married Princess Pauline Biron of Courland, Princess of Sagan.

=== Third marriage ===
Prince Hermann married his third wife, Countess Maria Antonia Monika of Waldburg-Zeil zu Wurzach (1753–1814), on 26 July 1779. The widow of Count Joseph Anton Damian Albert of Oettingen-Baldern-Katzenstein, she was a daughter of Count Franz Ernst Joseph Anton of Waldburg-Zeil-Wurzach and Countess Maria Eleonore of Königsegg-Rothenfels. Her brother was Eberhard, 1st Prince of Waldburg-Zeil-Wurzach. Together, they were the parents of:

- Princess Maria Antonia Philippine (1781–1831), who married Count Friedrich Ludwig von Waldburg-Capustigall in 1803.
- Princess Maria Theresia Franziska (1784–1784)
- Princess Franziska Theresia Karoline (1786–1810)
- Princess Maria Maximiliane Antonie (1787–1865), who married Count Eberhard von Waldburg-Wurzach in 1811. After his death in 1814, she married Count Klemens Josef von Lodron-Laterano in 1817.
- Princess Josephine (1790–1856), who married Count Ladislaus Festetics de Tolna in 1811.

Prince Hermann Friedrich Otto died on 2 November 1810.

Hermann, Prince of Hohenzollern-Hechingen House of Hohenzollern-Hechingen Cadet branch of the House of Hohenzollern Born: 30 July 1751 Died: 2 November 1810
Regnal titles
Preceded by Josef Friedrich Wilhelm	Prince of Hohenzollern-Hechingen; 9 April 1798 – 2 November 1810	Succeeded by Friedrich Hermann Otto
