= Friedrich Wilhelm, Prince of Hohenzollern-Hechingen =

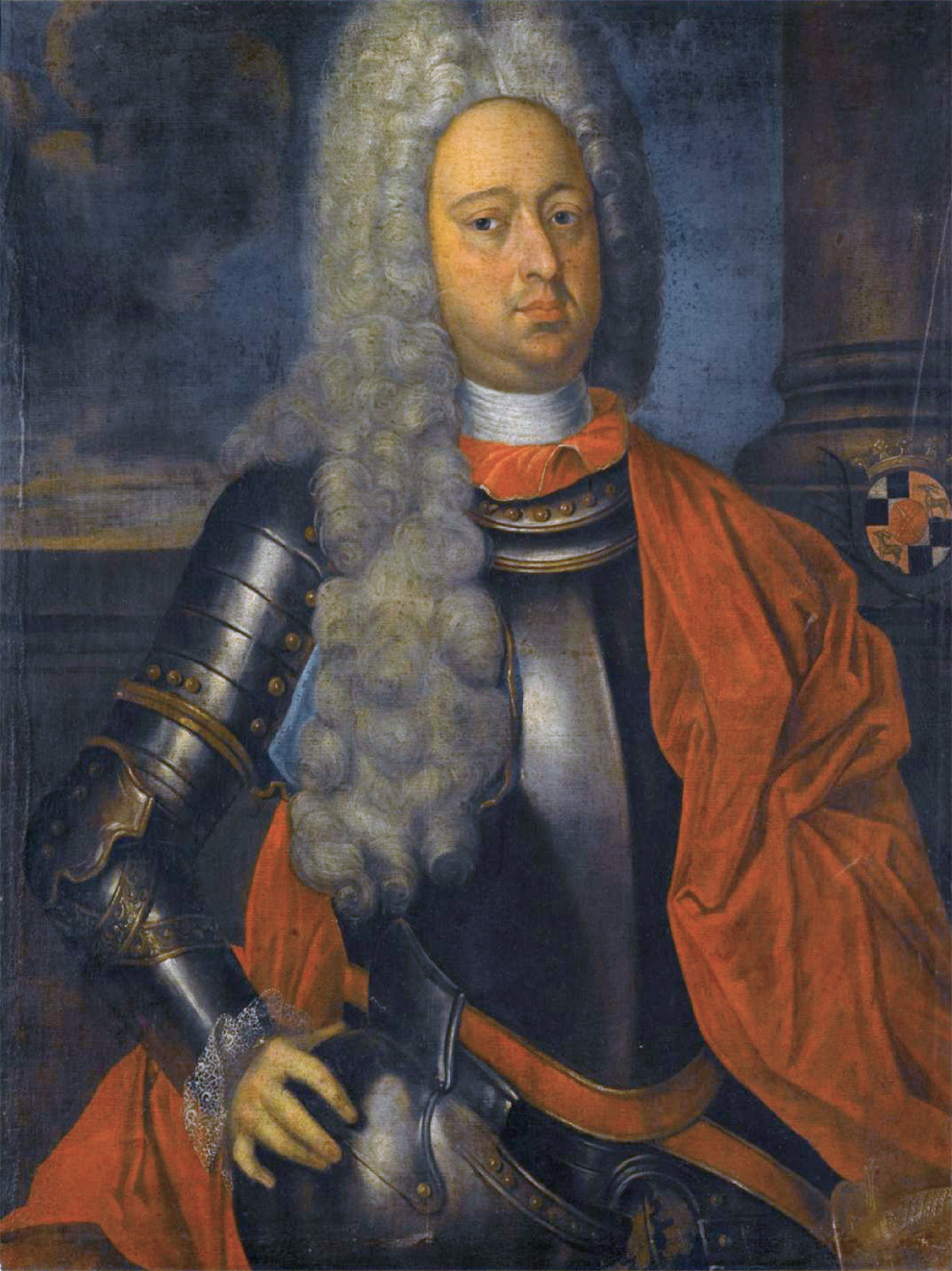
- Portrait of Friedrich Wilhelm c. 1700–1725
- Born: 20 September 1663; Hechingen
- Died: 14 November 1735 (aged 72); Hechingen
- Noble family: House of Hohenzollern
- Spouses: Maria Leopoldina of Sinzendorf; Maximiliane Magdalena of Lützau
- Father: Philipp, Prince of Hohenzollern-Hechingen
- Mother: Marie Sidonie of Baden-Rodemachern

Friedrich Wilhelm of Hohenzollern-Hechingen (20 September 1663 in Hechingen – 14 November 1735 in Hechingen) was the fourth Prince of Hohenzollern-Hechingen and was also an imperial Field Marshal.

== Life ==
Friedrich Wilhelm was the eldest son of Prince Philipp of Hohenzollern-Hechingen (1616–1671) from his marriage to Marie Sidonie (1635–1686), the daughter of Margrave Herman Fortunatus of Baden-Rodemachern. He was still a minor when he succeeded his father as Prince, so his mother took up the regency. Friedrich Wilhelm was sent to Baden, where he was further educated. He later completed his military training in Vienna. By the end of 1681, he took up the government of Hohenzollern-Hechingen himself.

In the imperial army, Friedrich Wilhelm was Field Marshal and the owner of a regiment of cuirassiers bearing his name. In 1682, he participated in the suppression of an uprising in Hungary and in the victory in the Battle of Slankamen.

In 1702, he was taken prisoner in Friedlingen. However, he managed to free himself. Two years later, he fought on the victorious side in the battle of Blenheim. Also in 1704, he fought under Field Marshal Sigbert Heister to suppress another Hungarian uprising.

With permission from the Emperor, Friedrich Wilhelm reached an agreement with the Elector of Brandenburg about the Burgraviate of Nuremberg and became one of the first recipients of the Prussian Order of the Black Eagle.

== Marriages and offspring ==
Friedrich Wilhelm married twice. He first married on 22 January 1687 in Vienna to Maria Leopoldina (1666–1709), the daughter of Count Georg Ludwig of Sinzendorf. With her, he had the following children:

- Friedrich Ludwig (1688–1750), Prince of Hohenzollern-Hechingen
- Ludwige Ernstine Friederike (1690–1720), married in 1713 Prince Franz Anton of Lamberg (1678–1759)
- Charlotte (1692–1692)
- Christine Eberhardine Friederike (1695–1754), abbess of Munsterbilzen Abbey
- Sophie Johanna Frederika (1698–1754), abbess of Munsterbilzen Abbey
- Friedrich Karl (1697–1697)

He married his second wife on 7 September 1710 in Hechingen. She was Baroness Maximiliane Magdalena of Lützau (1690–1755). Emperor Karl VI had elevated her to "Countess of Homburg" and this marriage was not considered morganatic. This marriage produced two children:

- Herman Eberhard Friedrich (1711–1726), Count of Hohenzollern
- Maria Maximiliana (1713–1743), married in 1741 to Count Innocent Künigl of Ehrenburg (1714–1764)

== Ancestry ==
Ancestors of Friedrich Wilhelm, Prince of Hohenzollern-Hechingen

16. Karl I, Count of Hohenzollern
8. Eitel Friedrich IV, Count of Hohenzollern
17. Anna of Baden-Durlach
4. Johann Georg, Prince of Hohenzollern-Hechingen
18. Froben Christoph of Zimmern
9. Sibylle of Zimmern
19. Kunigunde of Eberstein
2. Philipp, Prince of Hohenzollern-Hechingen
20. Philip Francis of Salm-Dhaun
10. Frederick I of Salm-Neufville
21. Maria Aegyptiaca of Oettingen-Oettingen
5. Franziska of Salm-Neufville
22. John VI of Salm
11. Franziska of Salm
23. Claude of Stainville
1. Friedrich Wilhelm, Prince of Hohenzollern-Hechingen
24. Christopher II, Margrave of Baden-Rodemachern
12. Edward Fortunatus, Margrave of Baden-Rodemachern
25. Princess Cecilia of Sweden
6. Herman Fortunatus, Margrave of Baden-Rodemachern
26. Joost of Eicken
13. Maria of Eicken
27. Barbara of Moll
3. Marie Sidonie of Baden-Rodemachern
28. Wirich of Criechingen
14. Count Christopher of Criechingen
29. Antonia of Salm-Kyrburg
7. Antonia Elisabeth of Criechingen
30. John Adam II Bayer of Boppard
15. Anna Bayer of Boppard
31. Maria of Malberg-Adicht

Friedrich Wilhelm, Prince of Hohenzollern-Hechingen House of Hohenzollern Born: 20 September 1663 Died: 14 November 1735
Preceded by Philipp	Prince of Hohenzollern-Hechingen; 1671–1735	Succeeded by Friedrich Ludwig
