= Eugensberg Castle =

Castle in Salenstein, Switzerland

Coordinates: 47°40′01″N 9°02′36″E

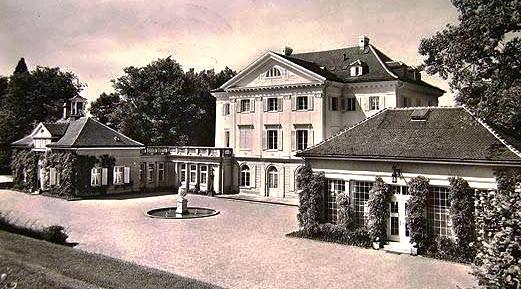
Eugensberg Castle

Eugensberg Castle is a castle in the municipality of Salenstein of the Canton of Thurgau in Switzerland. It is a Swiss heritage site of national significance.

The castle is named after its builder, Eugène de Beauharnais, Duke of Leuchtenberg and stepson of Emperor Napoleon, later inherited by his daughter, Eugénie de Beauharnais, Princess of Hohenzollern-Hechingen.

== See also ==
- List of castles in Switzerland
