= Constantine, Prince of Hohenzollern-Hechingen =

Prince of Hohenzollern-Hechingen from 1838 to 1849

Constantine
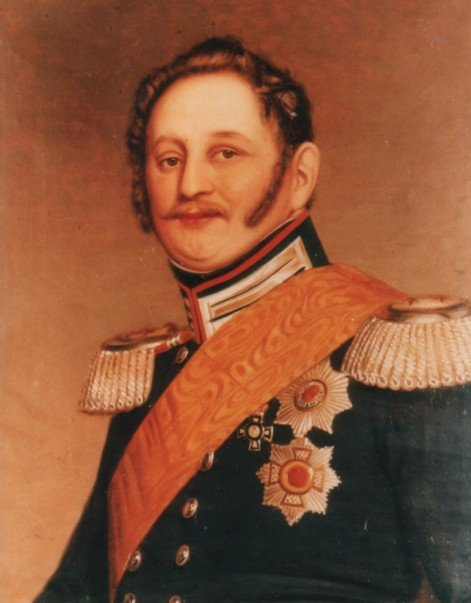
- Portrait of Constantine, c. 1840

Prince of Hohenzollern-Hechingen
- Reign: 13 September 1838 – 7 December 1849
- Predecessor: Friedrich Hermann Otto
- Successor: Annexation by Prussia
- Born: 16 February 1801; Schloss Sagan, Sagan, Silesia, Prussia
- Died: 3 September 1869 (aged 68); Schloss Polnisch Nettkow, Grünberg, Silesia, Prussia
- Spouse: Eugénie de Beauharnais (m. 1826; died 1847) Baroness Amalie Schenk von Geyern (m. 1850)
Names
- German: Friedrich Wilhelm Konstantin Hermann Thassilo
- House: Hohenzollern-Hechingen
- Father: Friedrich Hermann Otto, Prince of Hohenzollern-Hechingen
- Mother: Princess Pauline of Courland
- Religion: Roman Catholicism

Constantine, Prince of Hohenzollern-Hechingen (Friedrich Wilhelm Konstantin Hermann Thassilo; 16 February 1801 – 3 September 1869), was the last Prince of Hohenzollern-Hechingen. Constantine was the only child of Frederick, Prince of Hohenzollern-Hechingen and his wife, Princess Pauline of Courland, the daughter of the last Duke of Courland, Peter von Biron.

== Regency and reign ==
Constantine served as regent for his ill father, Frederick, beginning in 1834. Upon his father's death in 1838, Constantine became Prince of Hohenzollern-Hechingen and after the death of his mother in 1845, he also inherited the Duchy of Sagan. Following the Revolutions of 1848, Constantine and Charles Anthony, Prince of Hohenzollern-Sigmaringen both agreed to cede their principalities to the Kingdom of Prussia and renounced their rights as sovereign princes and heads of government on 7 December 1849.

== Marriages and issue ==
Constantine married firstly to Princess Eugénie de Beauharnais on 22 May 1826 in Eichstätt. They had no children.

After her death in September 1847, he married secondly (and morganatically) to Baroness Amalie Schenk von Geyern; upon their marriage, Frederick William IV of Prussia bestowed Amalie with the title Countess of Rothenburg. The couple had three children:

- Countess Friederike Wilhelmine Elisabeth von Rothenburg (1852–1914)
- Count Friedrich Wilhelm Karl von Rothenburg (1856–1912)
- Count Wilhelm Friedrich Louis Gustaf von Rothenburg (1861–1929)

He also had a daughter out of wedlock with Sophie Scherer:

- Ludovika Sophia (1824–1884)

== Death and dynastic end ==
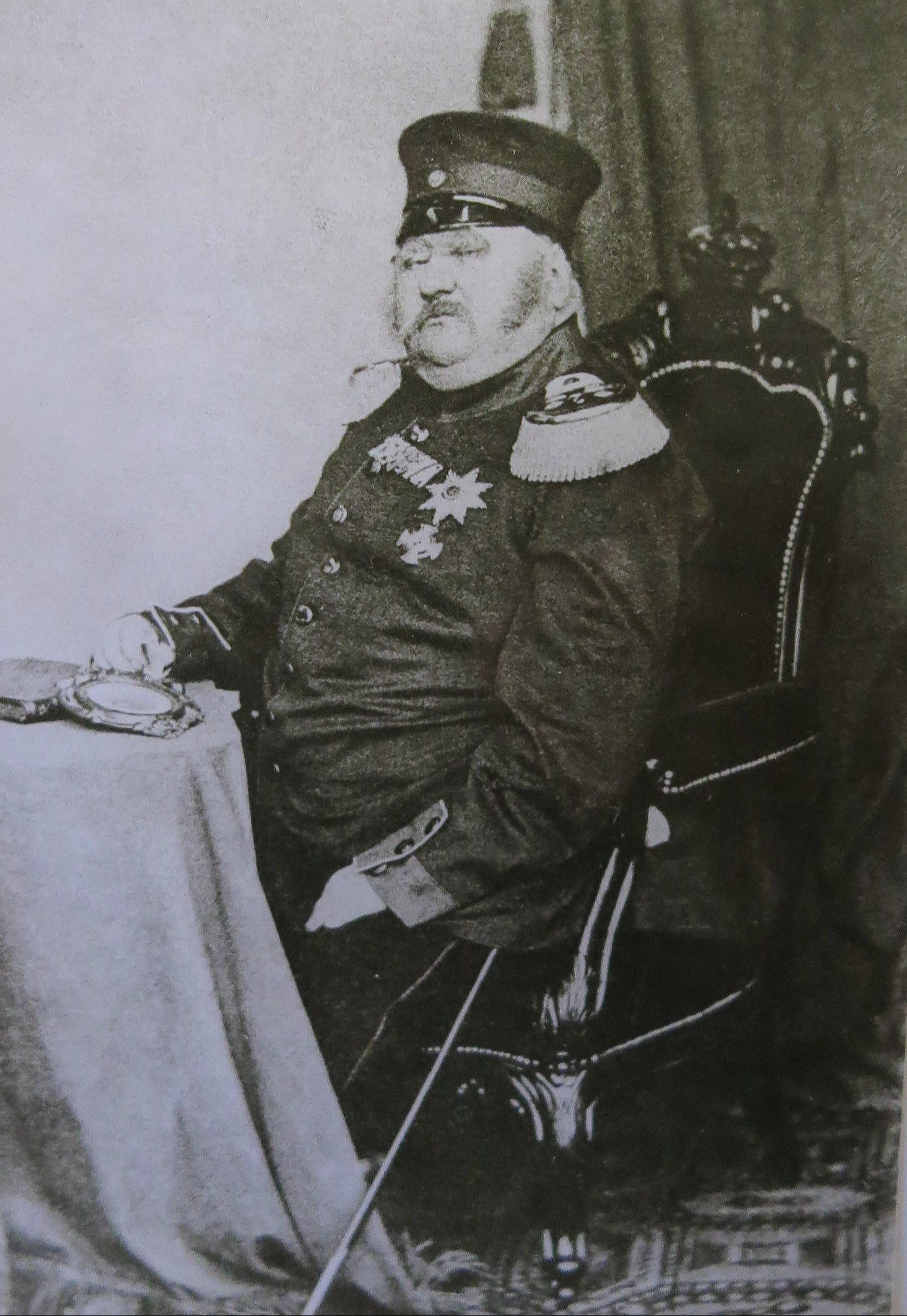
Photograph of Constantine after his abdication, c. 1860s

Constantine died on 3 September 1869 at his estate in Silesia. Because Constantine was the final dynast male member of the Hohenzollern-Hechingen dynastic line, having no legitimate heirs from his two marriages, his title passed to the head of the House of Hohenzollern-Sigmaringen, Charles Anthony, Prince of Hohenzollern.

== Honours ==
He received the following orders and decorations:

- Baden:
  - Grand Cross of the Zähringer Lion, 1821
  - Grand Cross of the House Order of Fidelity, 1823
- Württemberg:
  - Grand Cross of the Württemberg Crown, 1830
  - Grand Cross of the Friedrich Order, 1846
- Kingdom of Bavaria: Knight of St. Hubert, 1835
- Kingdom of Prussia:
  - Knight of the Black Eagle, with Collar, 24 December 1838
  - Grand Commander's Cross of the Royal House Order of Hohenzollern
  - Service Award Cross
- Hohenzollern: Joint Founder of the Princely House Order of Hohenzollern, 5 December 1841
- Sweden-Norway: Knight of the Seraphim, 21 July 1843
- Empire of Brazil: Grand Cross of the Southern Cross
- Kingdom of Portugal: Grand Cross of the Tower and Sword

== Ancestry ==
Ancestors of Constantine, Prince of Hohenzollern-Hechingen

8. Franz Xaver, Count of Hohenzollern-Hechingen
4. Hermann, Prince of Hohenzollern-Hechingen
9. Countess Anna Maria of Hoensbroech-Geulle
2. Friedrich Hermann Otto, Prince of Hohenzollern-Hechingen
10. François I Joseph, 2nd Prince de Gavre
5. Princess Maximiliane of Gavre
11. Marie Amour Désirée de Rouvray
1. Constantine, Prince of Hohenzollern-Hechingen
12. Ernst Johann, Duke of Courland and Semigallia
6. Peter, Duke of Courland and Semigallia
13. Benigna Gottlieb von Trotha genannt Treyden
3. Princess Pauline of Courland, Duchess of Sagan
14. Johann Friedrich, Count of Medem
7. Countess Dorothea von Medem
15. Louise Charlotte von Manteuffel

== Literature ==
- Anton-Heinrich Buckenmaier, Michael Hakenmüller: Friedrich-Wilhelm Constantin. Der letzte Fürst. Glückler, Hechingen 2005
- Gustav Schilling: Geschichte des Hauses Hohenzollern, in genealogisch fortlaufenden Biographien aller seiner Regenten von den ältesten bis auf die neuesten Zeiten, nach Urkunden und andern authentischen Quellen, F. Fleischer, 1843, p. 257 ff.

Constantine, Prince of Hohenzollern-Hechingen House of Hohenzollern-Hechingen Cadet branch of the House of Hohenzollern Born: 16 February 1801 Died: 3 September 1869
Regnal titles
Preceded by Frederick	Prince of Hohenzollern-Hechingen; 13 September 1838 – 7 December 1849	Principality annexed by the Kingdom of Prussia
Titles in pretence
Preceded by Himself	— TITULAR — Prince of Hohenzollern-Hechingen; 7 December 1849 – 3 September 1869; Reason for succession failure: Principality annexed by the Kingdom of Prussia in 1850	Succeeded by Karl Anton
