= State Deputation of Hohenzollern-Hechingen =

Unicameral legislature

State Deputation Landesdeputation

Type
- Type: Unicameral

History
- Founded: 1798
- Disbanded: 1850
- Seats: 12

The State Deputation was the unicameral legislature of the Principality of Hohenzollern-Hechingen. It existed from 1798 until the two Hohenzollern principalities were absorbed into Prussia as the Province of Hohenzollern in 1850.

== History ==
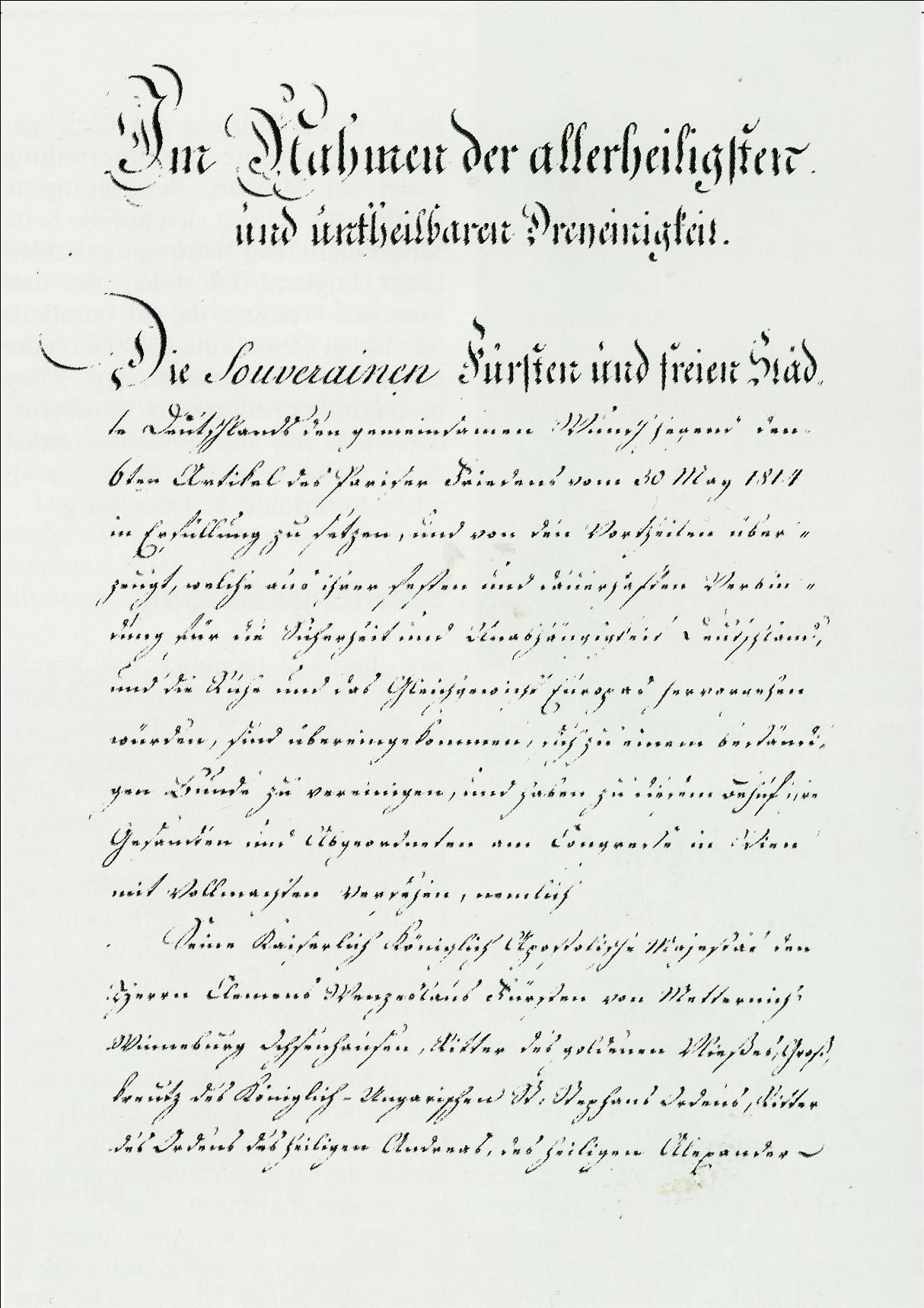
First page of the Constitution of the German Confederation

Formed in 1798 as the Tax Deputation (Steuerdeputation), the State Deputation of Hohenzollern-Hechingen initially exercised little control over the state of affairs in the principality. Constitutions were drafted in Hohenzollern-Hechingen and Hohenzollern-Sigmaringen in 1831 as a result of Article XIII of the 1815 Constitution of the German Confederation, which obligated member states to institute constitutions. In February 1835 new electoral regulations were adopted in the principality. These regulations formally changed the name of the Tax Deputation to the State Deputation and its powers were expanded significantly. The legislature consisted of 12 indirectly elected deputies (two of whom represented the city of Hechingen) representing eleven constituencies and met every three years. Following the 1835 elections, the number of constituencies was reduced to six, with two deputies representing each constituency.
