= New Castle (Hechingen) =

Nineteenth-century palace in Hechingen in Germany

Coordinates: 48°21′13″N 8°57′48″E

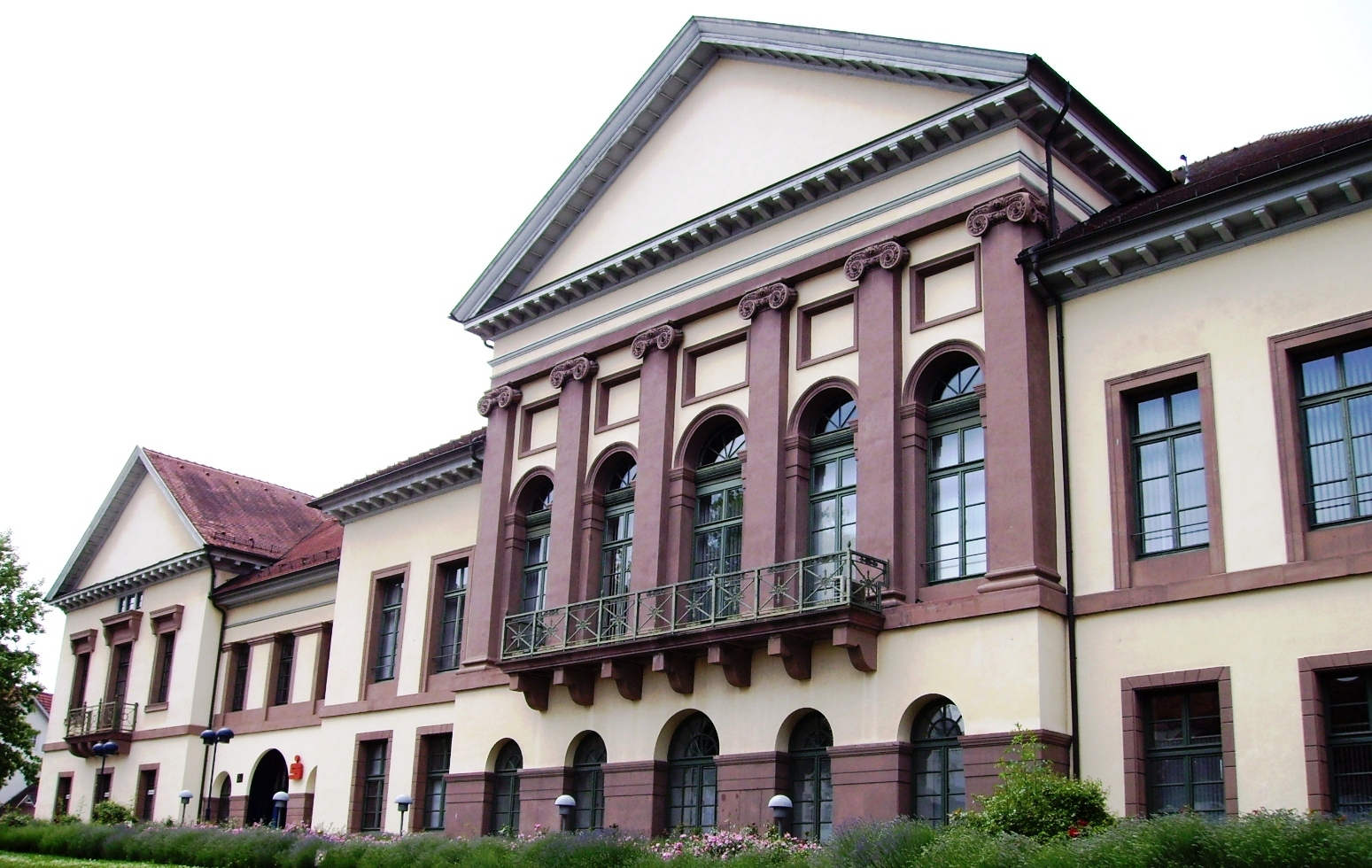
The New Castle

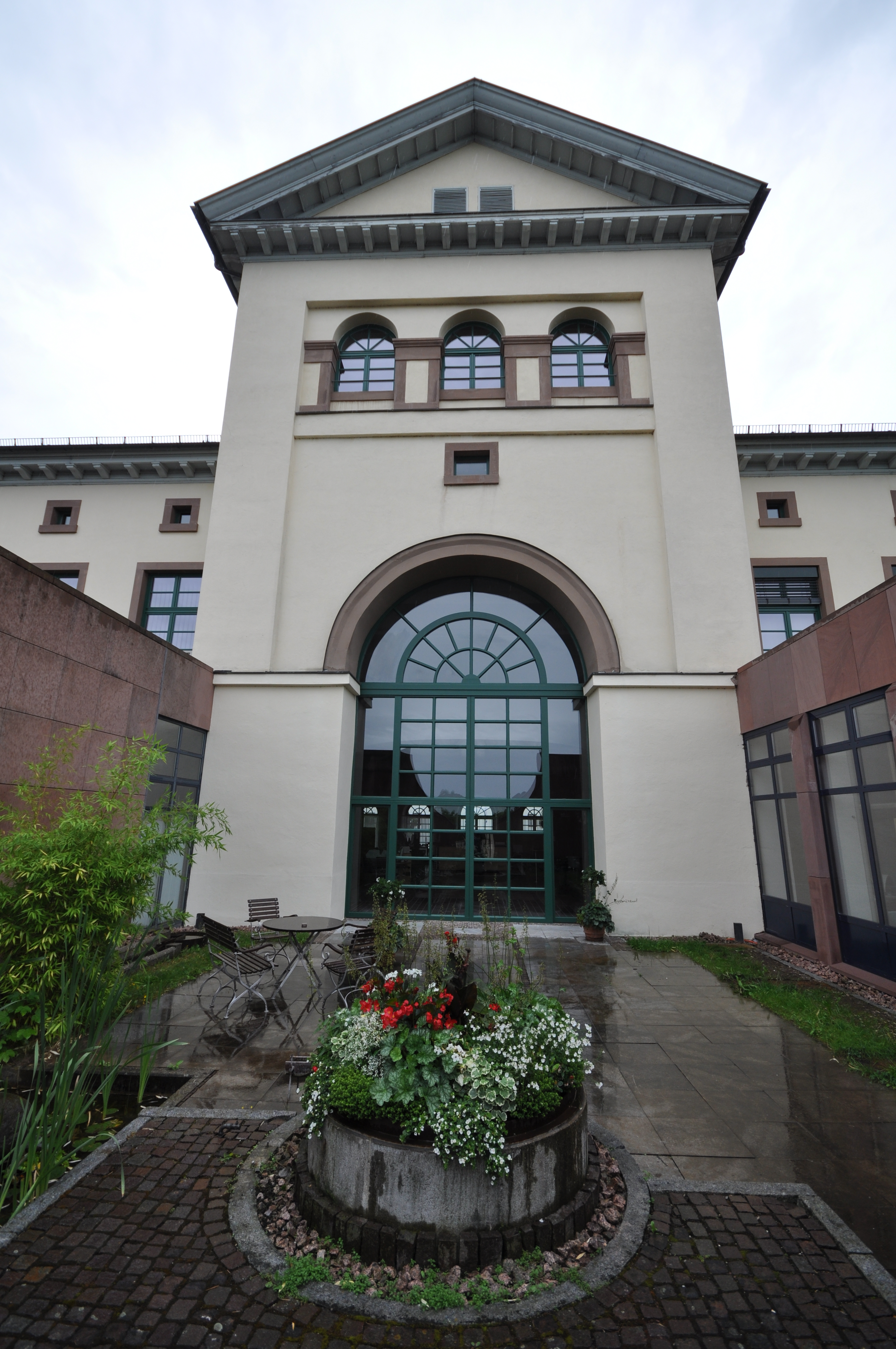
The rear of Burnitz's building, with modern extensions

The New Castle (Neues Schloss) is a nineteenth-century palace in Hechingen in Germany. It served as the city residence for princes of the House of Hohenzollern-Hechingen.

== History ==
The first building on the site was a Renaissance-style residence built by Eitel Frederick IV, Count of Hohenzollern in the late 16th century. Apart from a few minor remnants, it was demolished by Friedrich Hermann Otto at the start of the 19th century to make way for the three-wing present structure, built between 1818 and 1819, designed by Rudolf Burnitz and funded by French reparations from the Congress of Vienna. Burnitz was a pupil of Friedrich Weinbrenner, a leading neo-classical architect in the Grand Duchy of Baden. The castle remained unfinished, since the principality was in debt and the funds for its construction ran out.

== Bibliography ==
- Friedrich Hossfeld und Hans Vogel: Die Kunstdenkmäler Hohenzollerns, Bd. 1: Kreis Hechingen. Holzinger, Hechingen 1939, S. 186 ff.
- Wulf Schirmer (Hrsg.): Friedrich Weinbrenner und die Weinbrenner-Schule, Bd. 1: Die barocke Stadtplanung und die ersten klassizistischen Entwürfe Weinbrenners. Müller, Karlsruhe 1996, ISBN 3-7650-9041-7 (zugl. Dissertation, Universität Karlsruhe 1990).
