= Peter Burnitz =

German painter (1824–1886)

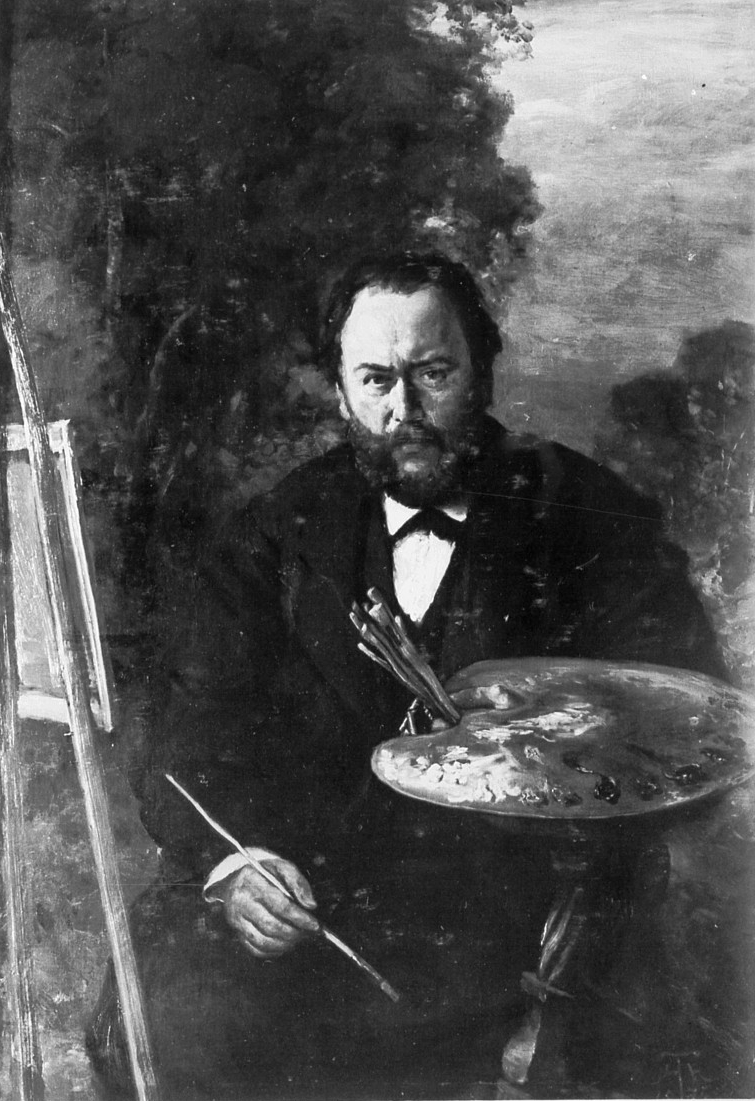
Peter Burnitz, by Hans Thoma (1875)

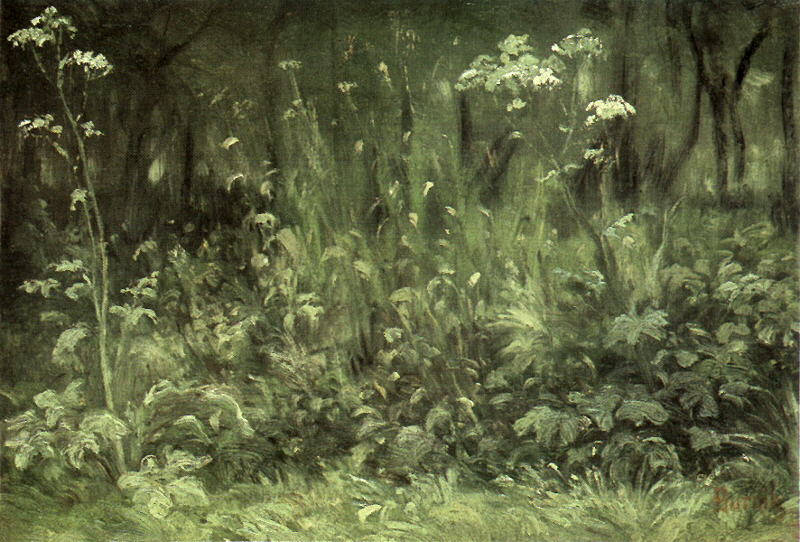
Meadow Scene with Acanthus (date unknown)

Carl Peter Burnitz (14 January 1824 – 18 August 1886) was a German landscape painter who began as a lawyer.

== Life and work ==
He was born in Frankfurt. He became an orphan at the age of nine and was placed under the care of his uncle, the architect Rudolf Burnitz. After graduating from the local schools, he entered the University of Berlin, where he studied law. In 1844, he moved to the University of Göttingen, then to the University of Heidelberg where he received his Doktor Juris (Doctor of Law) degree in 1847.

That summer, he began an extensive tour of Rome, Naples and Palermo. He returned to Frankfurt in 1849, briefly practicing law but, feeling dissatisfied with the legal profession and inspired by what he had seen in Italy, he took another trip in 1852, visiting Algiers and Madrid. There he met the painter Fritz Bamberger who suggested that Burnitz go to Paris to study art. With Bamberger's recommendation, he made contact with the lithographer Karl Bodmer, who introduced him to the Barbizon School. He soon began studying with Emile Lambinet.

In 1857, he returned to Frankfurt where he made friends with Anton Burger and Jakob Fürchtegott Dielmann, who convinced him to live at the art colony in Kronberg. By 1878, he was successful enough to purchase a large, multi-story home in Frankfurt. However, following a common custom among the newly rich, he never lived there himself. Instead, it became the residence of fellow artist Eduard von Steinle.

Burnitz died in Frankfurt on 18 August 1886.

Most of his paintings are in private collections, as is the case with a majority of the artists who worked at Kronberg.
