= Eugénie de Beauharnais =

Princess Eugénie
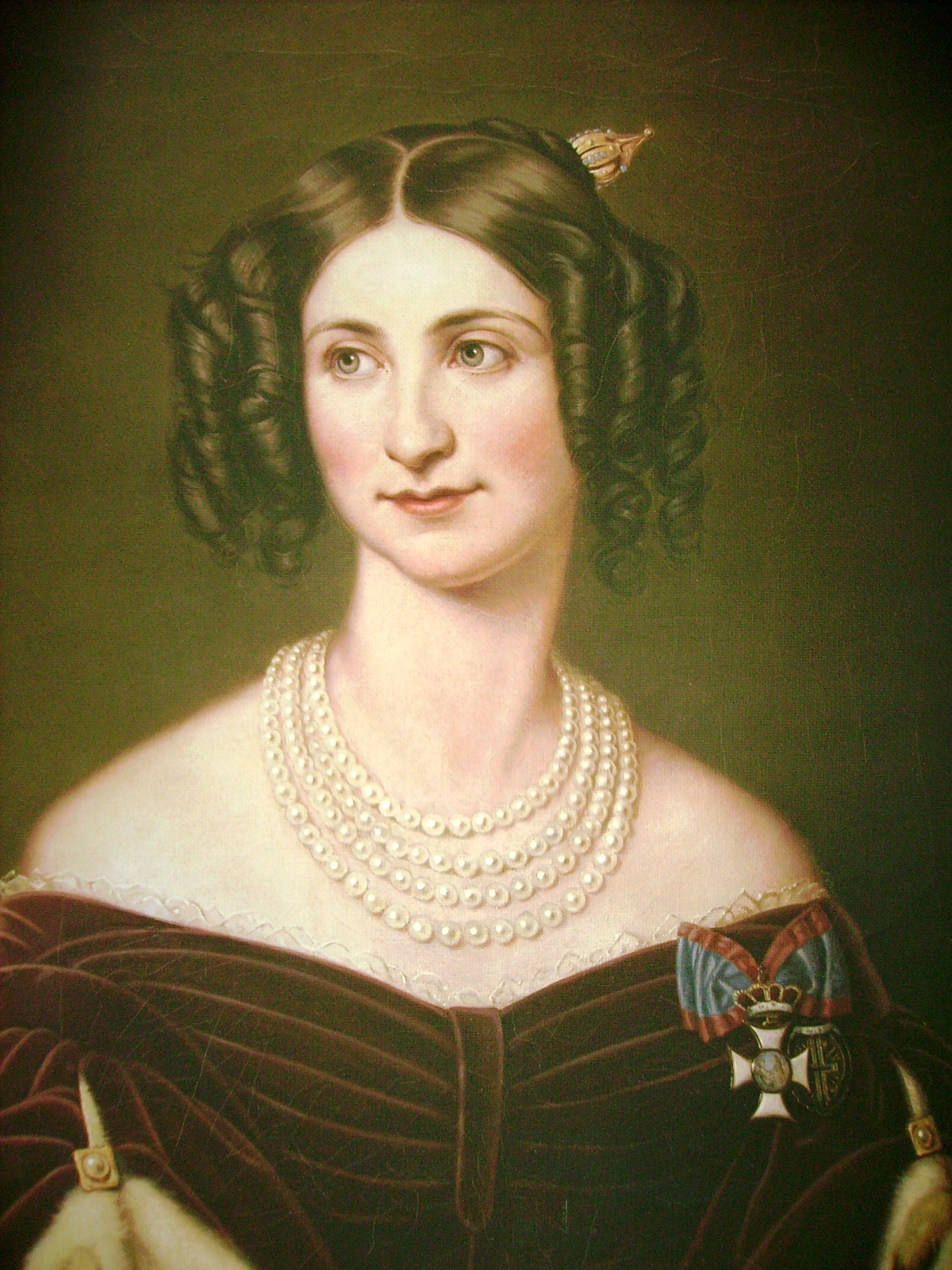
- Portrait of Eugenie de Beauharnais, Palace of Ajuda

Princess consort of Hohenzollern-Hechingen
- Tenure: 13 September 1838 – 1 September 1847
- Born: 23 December 1808; Milan
- Died: 1 September 1847 (aged 38); Freudenstadt
- Burial: 4 September 1847; Stiftskirche, Hechingen, Hohenzollern
- Spouse: Constantine, Prince of Hohenzollern-Hechingen (m. 1826)
Names
- Eugénie Hortense Auguste Napoléone de Beauharnais
- House: Beauharnais
- Father: Eugène de Beauharnais
- Mother: Princess Augusta of Bavaria

Eugénie Hortense Auguste Napoléone de Beauharnais, Princess of Leuchtenberg (23 December 1808 – 1 September 1847) was a Franco-German princess. She was the second daughter of Eugène de Beauharnais and Princess Augusta of Bavaria, and a member of the House of Beauharnais. In 1826, she married Constantine, Prince of Hohenzollern-Hechingen.

== Life ==
=== Early years ===
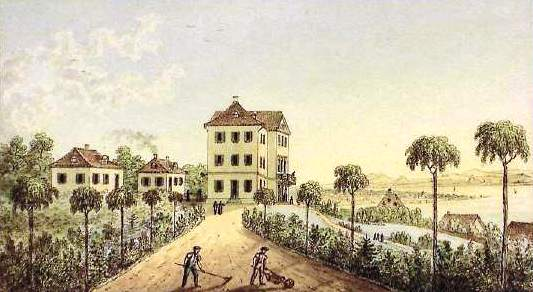
Schloss Eugensberg in 1850

Born and raised as a Catholic, Eugénie grew up in the Palais Leuchtenberg on Ludwigstraße in Munich and frequently spent the summer months with her parents at Schloss Eugensberg, a castle built by her father on Lake Constance (at what is now Salenstein). The family's behaviour was princely in every aspect - the French envoy Coulomb wrote in 1822: "Prince Eugène de Beauharnais lives in greater luxury than [Napoleon's] court". Their palace in Munich had been built by the famous Bavarian architect Leo von Klenze for over 2 million guilders. Besides Munich and Schloss Eugensberg, the family had manors at Eichstätt and Ismaning. On her father's death in 1824, Eugénie inherited Schloss Eugensberg.

=== Marriage ===
On 22 May 1826, Eugénie married the Catholic Hereditary Prince Constantine of Hohenzollern-Hechingen in Eichstätt. Eugénie brought Hofkavalier Gustav von Billing (born in Leuchtenberg) to Hechingen as her financial advisor - he managed her large dowry on her mother's behalf and quickly won Constantine's trust as an advisor. From 1833 on, Eugénie and her husband lived at Schloss Lindich near Hechingen, the residence city of the House of Hohenzollern-Hechingen, though they also spent much of the summer months at Schloss Eugensberg, thus keeping in contact with her aunt Hortense and her cousin Louis Napoleon, who later became Napoleon III.

=== Life in Hechingen ===
Eugénie had a great lust for life and even hunted deer with her husband in 1831. The couple took many trips to Munich, to Schloss Eugensburg by Lake Constance, to Schloss Tegernsee in Tegernsee, the summer residence of the kings of Bavaria, and in 1833 a Grand Tour to Italy, which lasted nearly 18 months and went as far as Sicily.

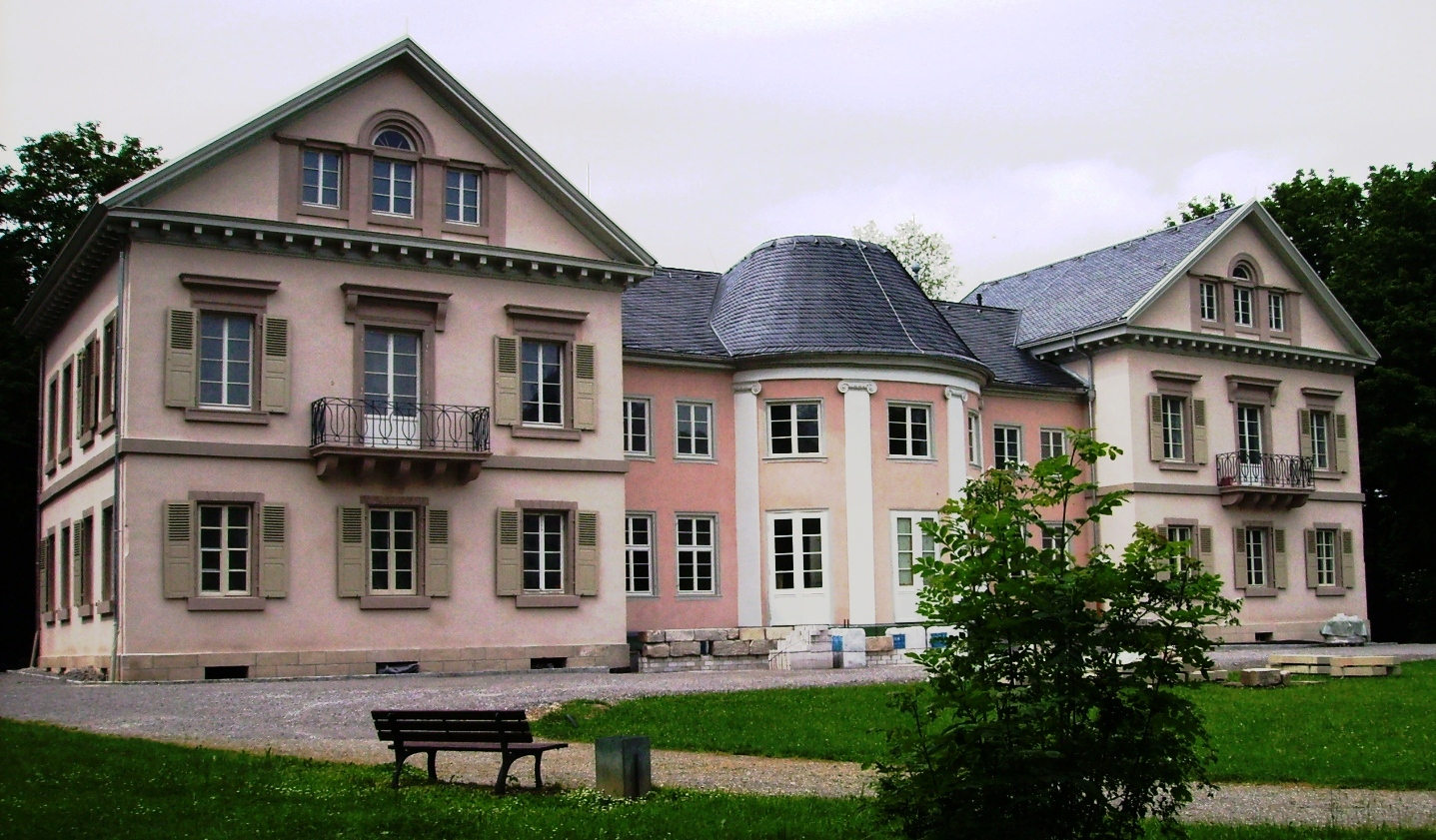
Villa Eugenia in Hechingen

Eugénie then sold Schloss Eugensberg for 32,000 guilders to Heinrich von Kiesow of Augsburg. The proceeds of that sale financed her rebuilding of Villa Eugenia in Hechingen, where the couple took up residence in 1834. At the southern edge of the villa's park, she acquired the Gasthaus Zur Silberburg and in 1844 rebuilt it as another villa, to house visiting noble relations. The surrounding gardens were also bought up and redesigned as an English landscape, now known as the Fürstengarten.

Some of the couple's famous guests at Hechingen included her cousin Napoleon III, Hector Berlioz, and Franz Liszt. The Hofkapelle had a good choir, and from 1843 the villa hosted Sunday concerts by members of the Museumsgesellschaft (museum society) and the Musikvereins (music society).

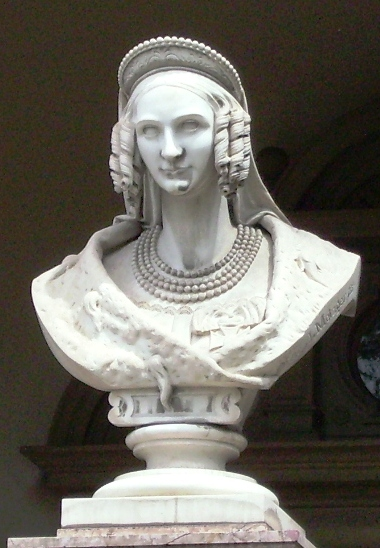
Bust of Eugénie de Beauharnais at the Kinderbewahranstalt in Hechingen which she founded

She remained childless and sought comfort in increasing piety, setting up an old-people's home in Hechingen and (in 1839) a major Kinderbewahranstalt for the town (the building which housed the latter contains a bust of her and is now the Amtsgericht). The latter was set up for those children whose parents "were often hindered by business or domestic difficulties, at home or in the fields, from bringing up their small children."

For ten years she attended her father-in-law Frederick, mortally ill from war injuries, who died in 1838 at Schloss Lindich. Every Maundy Thursday, Eugénie and her husband washed the feet of twelve old and needy local people and then invited them to an Apostelmahl or Last Supper in the Billardhäuschen in the Fürstengarten, at which (after a grace) a stockfish with sauerkraut was passed round.

Eugénie became ill with tuberculosis and in winter 1846 moved into the so-called Hofküche directly behind the Villa Eugenia, since it could be better heated. Her doctors gave her odd treatments, including the inhalation of fumes from cow dung and the burning of moxa sticks on her chest. Due to the risk of spreading the disease, she could only see her husband rarely, and even then only at a distance. In summer 1847 she set off to seek a cure at the Badenweiler spa, but on the return journey she died at the Hotel Post in Freudenstadt on 1 September 1847. She was buried in the vault before the high altar of the Stiftskirche in Hechingen. On her mother's request, her heart was placed in an urn in the chapel of the Palais Leuchtenberg in Munich; since 1952 it has been housed in a niche beside the choir steps on the right side of the Stiftskirche. In her will she left her fortune of 273,000 guilders to charity.

== Honours ==
- Dame of the Order of Saint Elizabeth.

== Ancestry ==
Ancestors of Eugénie de Beauharnais

8. François de Beauharnais, marquis de La Ferté-Beauharnais
4. Alexandre, vicomte de Beauharnais
9. Henriette Pyvart de Chastullé
2. Eugène, Duke of Leuchtenberg
10. Joseph Gaspard Tascher de La Pagerie
5. Joséphine Tascher de La Pagerie
11. Rose Claire des Vergers de Sannois
1. Eugénie de Beauharnais
12. Frederick Michael, Count Palatine of Zweibrücken
6. Maximilian I Joseph of Bavaria
13. Countess Palatine Maria Franziska of Sulzbach
3. Princess Augusta of Bavaria
14. Prince George William of Hesse-Darmstadt
7. Princess Augusta Wilhelmine of Hesse-Darmstadt
15. Countess Maria Louise Albertine of Leiningen-Dagsburg-Falkenburg

== Bibliography ==
- Anton-Heinrich Buckenmaier, Michael Hakenmüller: Constantin, der letzte Fürst. Glückler, Hechingen 2005
- Rudolf Marti: Eugensberg, ein Schloss und 2500 Jahre Geschichte. Huber, Frauenfeld 1997

Eugénie de Beauharnais House of Beauharnais Born: 22 December 1808 Died: 1 September 1847
Regnal titles
Preceded by Pauline of Courland	Princess consort of Hohenzollern-Hechingen; 13 September 1838 – 1 September 1847	Principality annexed by the Kingdom of Prussia
