= Rudolf Burnitz =

German architect (1788–1849)

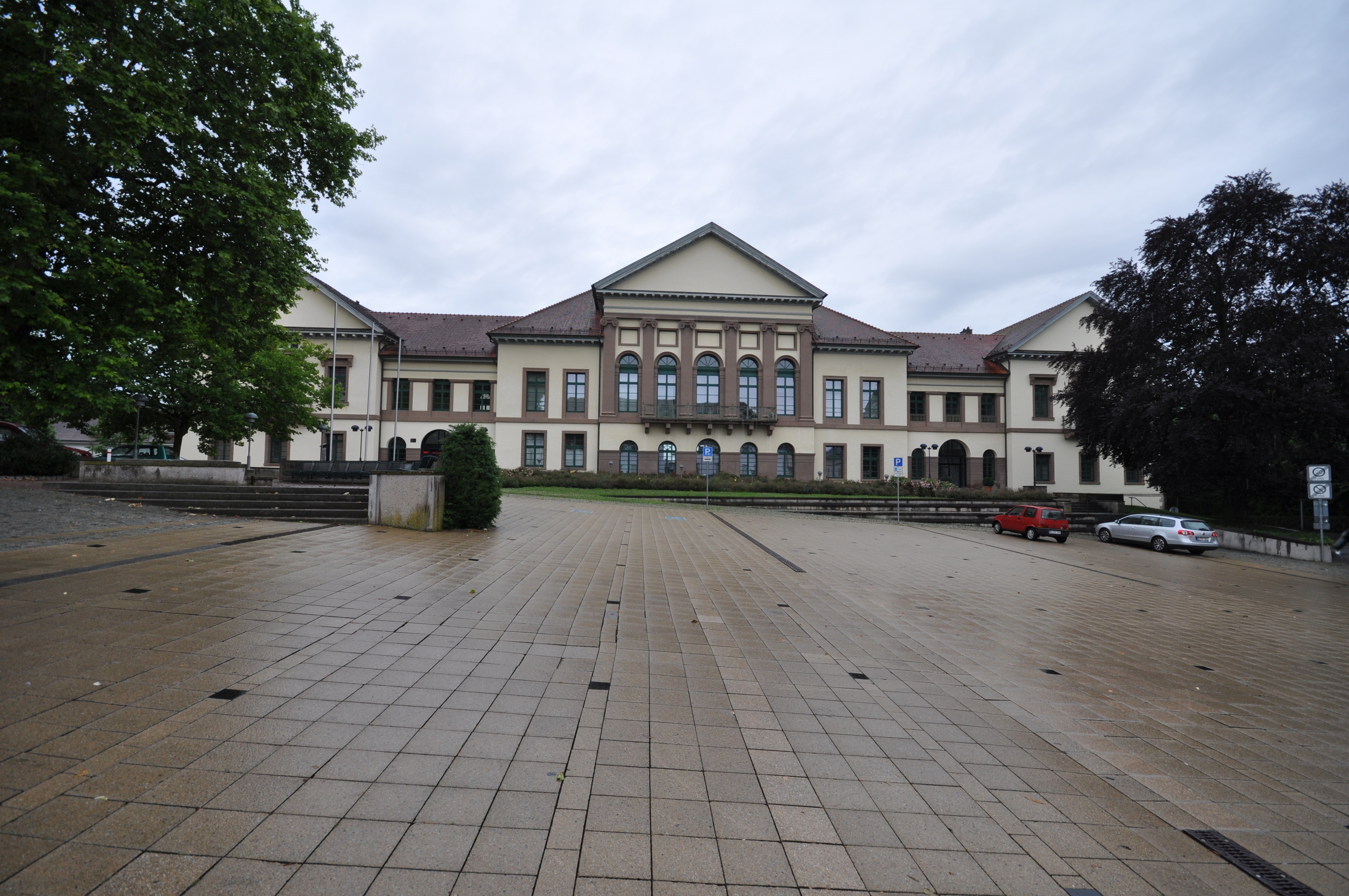
The unfinished Castle in Hechingen (1816-1819)

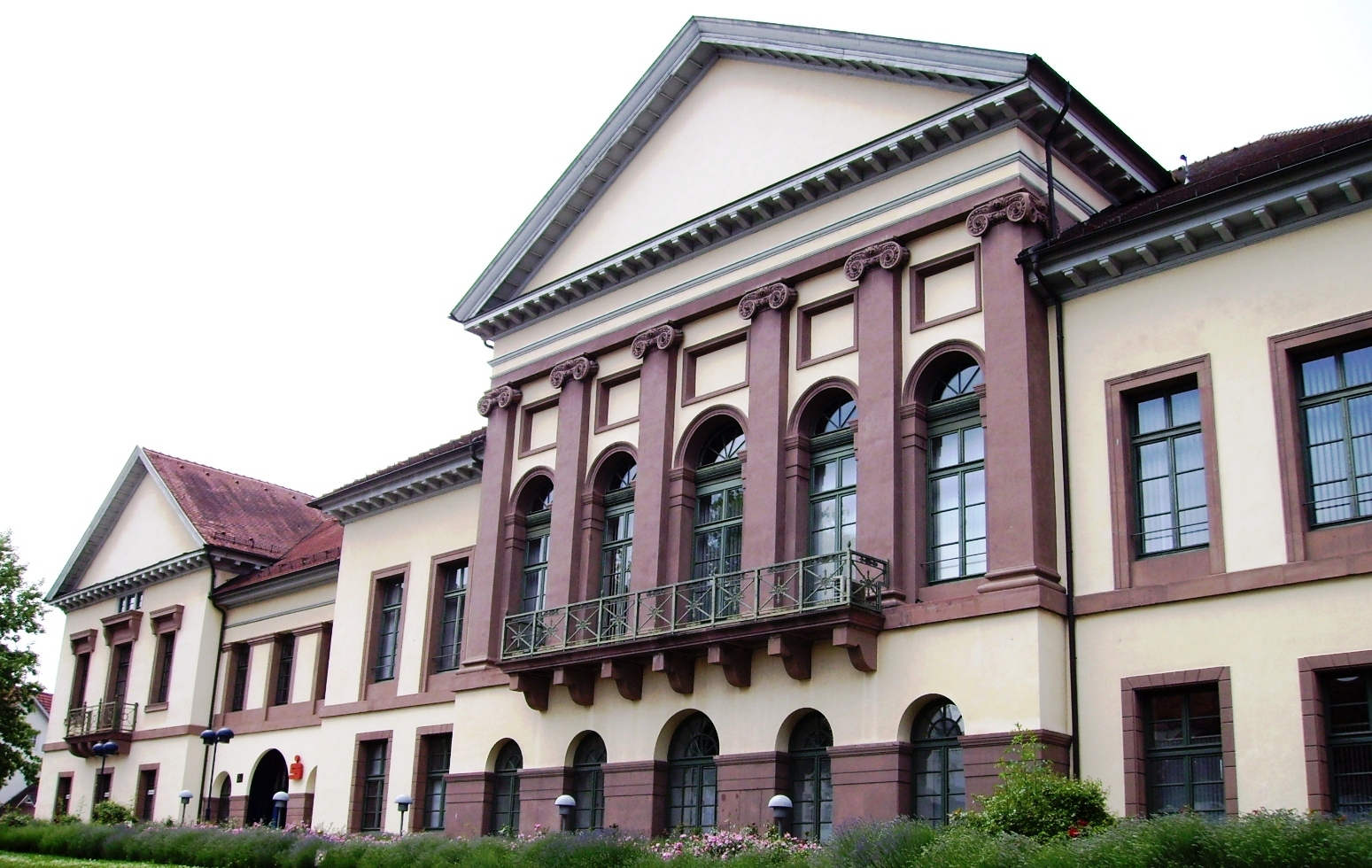
A second view of the unfinished castle (1816-1819)

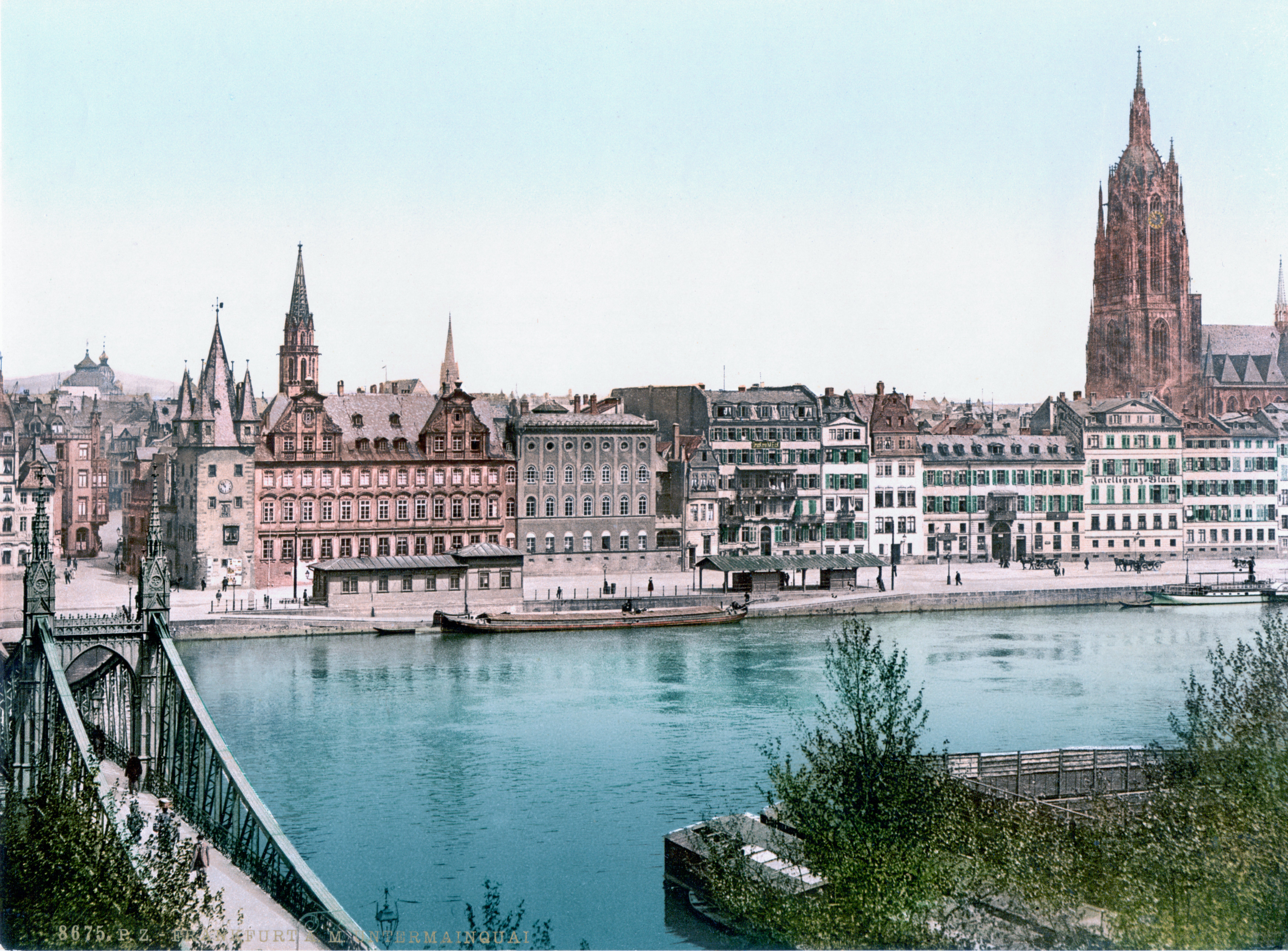
View of Frankfurt am Main

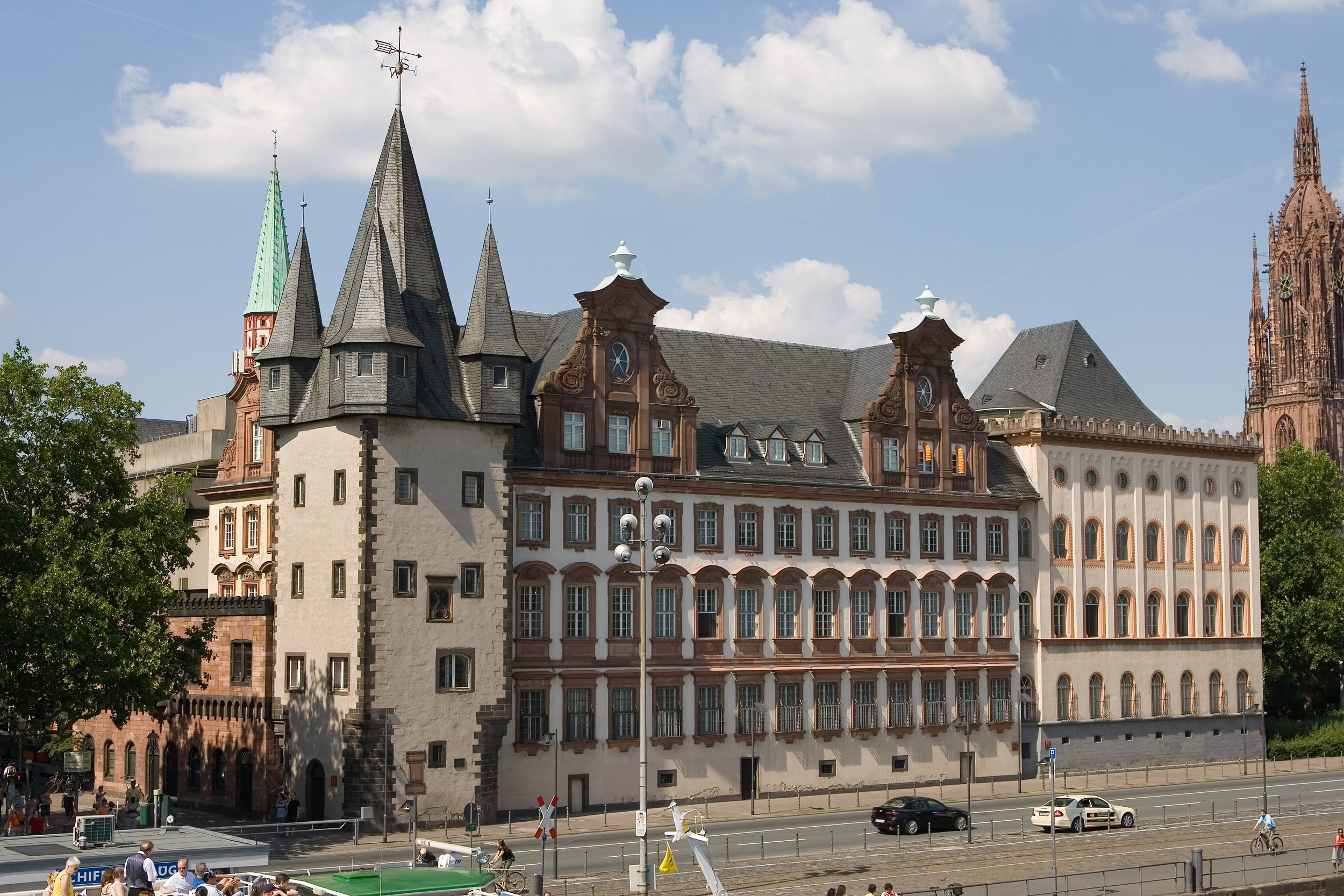
The Saalhof with Bernus and the Burnitz at Frankfurt am Main

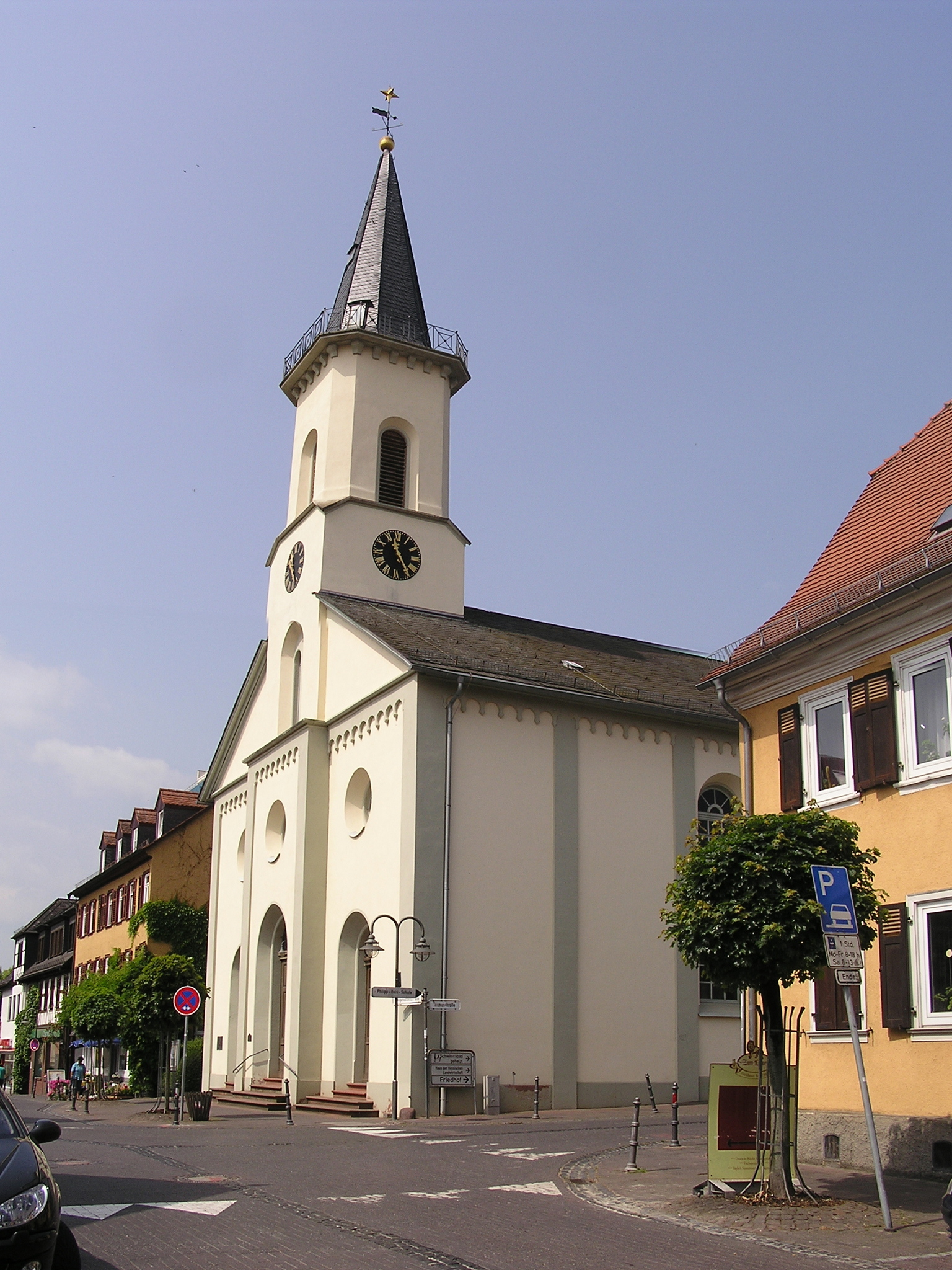
The French reformed church in Friedrichsdorf (Taunus)

Rudolf Burnitz (6 December 1788 - 28 January 1849) was a German neo classical and early historicist architect. Burnitz was born in Ludwigsburg.

== Education and military career ==
Burnitz was a student of Friedrich Weinbrenner in Karlsruhe, where he studied mathematics and technical sciences. In 1810 he joined the Württemberg Corps of Engineers from 1810 to 1816 during the Napoleonic Wars, in which time he was stationed at the Stuttgart and Ludwigsburg garrisons. During his military career, Burnitz was involved in the reconstruction of the Ludwigsburg Palace. In 1816 he resigned at the rank of lieutenant.

== Career ==
In an abandoned site, Burnitz was in charge of construction from 1816-1819 of Hohenzollern Castle in Hechingen which was never finished due to lack of funds. From 1820 and 1821 he travelled through Venice, Florence, Rome and Naples. By the end of 1821 he went to Frankfurt, where he gained citizenship in 1822. Burnitz belonged to a group of city architects including Johann Friedrich Christian Hess, and Friedrich Hull who shaped the classical Frankfurt cityscape of the 19th century.

Despite his career as an architect, he undertook further travel within Germany, and also to the Netherlands and Belgium. Burnitz was appointed in 1824 to Inspector and Technical advisor by the Prince of Hohenzollern-Sigmaringen, Anton Aloys.

In 1831, with the partnership of Frankfurt entrepreneur Johann Hermann Osterrieth, Burnitz founded "Kronthaler Actien Club", also called "Cur-Anstalt of Crone Thal near Cronberg joint-stock company". He then began work surveying and preparing a parcel of land. After obtaining a building permit Burnitz and Osterrieth built a spa and bath house with catering from 1832–33, to offer a luxury bath house to customers. However, by 1845 the company was resold due to a lack of profit.

In 1832 he requested from the Senate of the Free City of Frankfurt to establish a steam mill. It would have become the first stationary steam engine of Frankfurt. The Senate approved its construction as a grain, board, and grinding mill, but Burnitz renounced his involvement due to this amendment. It was not until four years later that Senator Johann Adam Beil approved the first steam engine in Frankfurt to be constructed.

From 1834 to 1837 he constructed the French Reformed Church in Friedrichsdorf. Then, from 1842–43, he constructed his most famous work, the Burnitz court hall, now part of the Historical Museum of Frankfurt. It is also the only one of his works in which he left his usual strict classic style in favor of a more neo-Romanesque historicism.

== Personal life and death ==
Burnitz married on May 2, 1823, Maria Sophia Saltzwedel (born 1788). The marriage produced six children, including their eldest son and later architect Rudolf Heinrich Burnitz. Burnitz since 1833 also was guardian of his orphaned nephew, the lawyer and painter Peter Burnitz (born 1824).

Rudolf Burnitz died on January 28, 1849, in Frankfurt am Main. His grave is located in the Frankfurt's main cemetery in the Masonic Lodge of Frankfurt.

== Architectural works ==
- New Castle in Hechingen (1816-1819), unfinished
- Supply Depot of Wiesenhüttenplatz (1824, demolished in 1884 for the courthouse still located there today)
- Orphanage (1826, demolished before 1900)
- Metz Palais Lersches, Alt-Bonames 6 (1827)
- Israelite Hospital in Rechneigrabenstraße, 1829-31 (probably destroyed in the war)
- Atelier-cultivation of his own home at Untermainkai (1831, later lost in war)
- French Reformed Church in Friedrichsdorf (1834)
- House of Alexander du Fay in the Neue Mainzer Straße (war loss) and Manskopf cal residence on Untermainkai (war loss)
- Residence of the Leerse-Bernus family, known as the Burnitz Hall Court (1842/43), now part of the Historical Museum of the City of Frankfurt am Main

== Literature ==
- Albert Dessoff: Biographisches Lexikon der Frankfurter Künstler im neunzehnten Jahrhundert. In: Heinrich Weizsäcker: Kunst und Künstler in Frankfurt am Main im neunzehnten Jahrhundert. Verlag von Joseph Baer, Frankfurt am Main 1909, S. 22-24
- Wolfgang Klötzer (Hrsg.): Frankfurter Biographie. Personengeschichtliches Lexikon. Erster Band. A–L (= Veröffentlichungen der Frankfurter Historischen Kommission. XIX, Nr. 1). Waldemar Kramer, Frankfurt am Main 1994, ISBN 3-7829-0444-3.

== Bibliography ==
- Albert Dessoff: Biographisches Lexikon der Frankfurter Künstler im neunzehnten Jahrhundert. In: Heinrich Weizsäcker: Kunst und Künstler in Frankfurt am Main im neunzehnten Jahrhundert. Verlag von Joseph Baer, Frankfurt am Main 1909, S. 22-24
