= Hechingen =

- Town
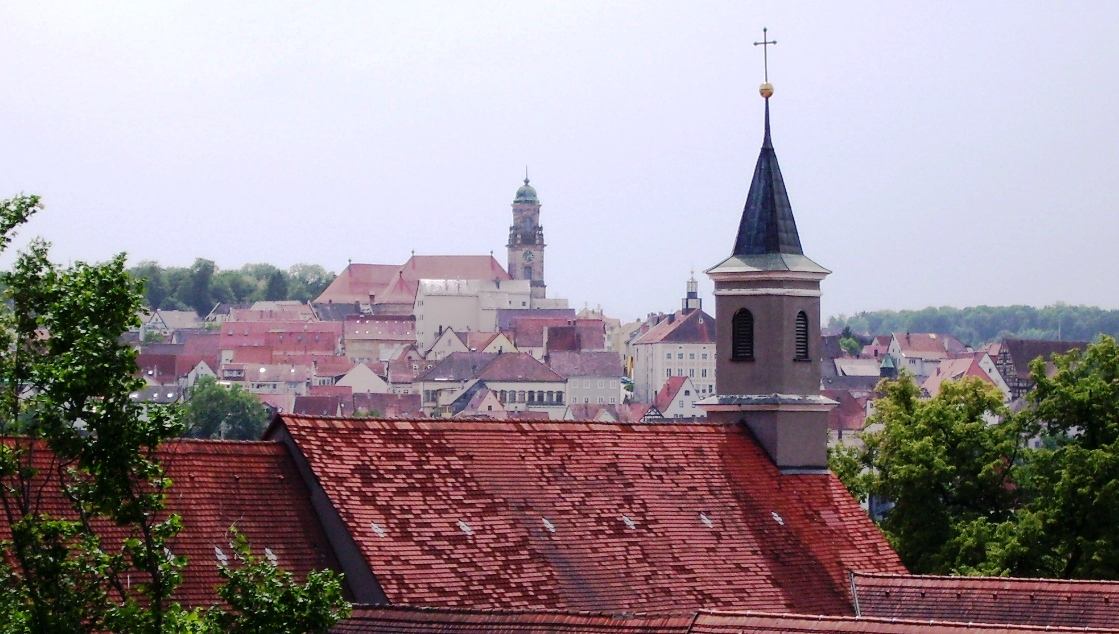
- View to the old town

- Coat of arms

- Location of Hechingen within Zollernalbkreis district
- Interactive map of Hechingen
- Location within Germany Location within Baden-Württemberg
- Coordinates: 48°21′06″N 08°57′48″E
- Country: Germany
- State: Baden-Württemberg
- Admin. region: Tübingen
- District: Zollernalbkreis
- Subdivisions: 9

Government
  - Mayor (2018–26): Philipp Hahn (CDU)

Area
  - Total: 66.41 km^{2} (25.64 sq mi)
- Elevation: 528 m (1,732 ft)

Population (2025-12-31)
  - Total: 19,760
  - Density: 297.5/km^{2} (770.6/sq mi)
- Time zone: UTC+01:00 (CET)
  - Summer (DST): UTC+02:00 (CEST)
- Postal codes: 72371–72379
- Dialling codes: 07471, 07477 (Schlatt)
- Vehicle registration: BL or HCH
- Website: www.hechingen.de

Hechingen (German pronunciation: [ˈhɛçɪŋən]; Swabian: Hächenga) is a town in central Baden-Württemberg, Germany. It is situated about 60 kilometres (37 mi) south of the state capital of Stuttgart and 90 kilometres (56 mi) north of Lake Constance and the Swiss border.

== Geography ==
The town lies at the foot of the Swabian Alps below Hohenzollern Castle.

=== City districts ===
The city of Hechingen is subdivided into nine neighborhoods, and the downtown is separated into Oberstadt/Altstadt (Upper Town/Old Town) and Unterstadt (Lower Town).

=== Surrounding region ===
Other cities in the area include Bodelshausen, Mössingen, Jungingen, Bisingen, Grosselfingen, Rangendingen, and Hirrlingen.

== History ==
=== Early history ===
Recent research shows that the battle of Solicinium, fought in 368 between the invading Alamanni and a Roman army led by Emperor Valentinian I, probably took place in the northern part of what is today Hechingen and the lost city Solicinium was located where the Roman museum of Hechingen is located today.

=== Middle Ages ===
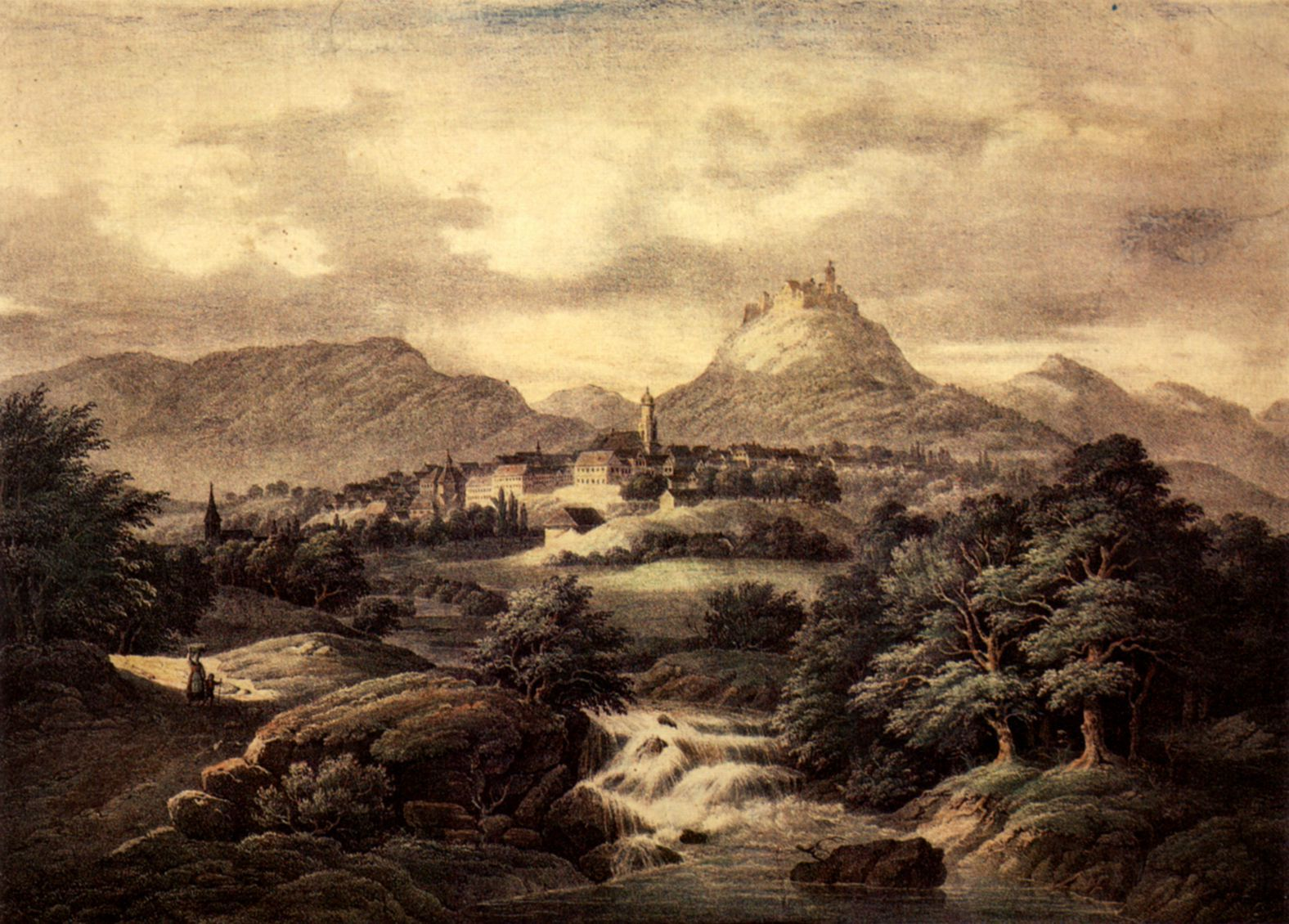
Hechingen (middleground) and Hohenzollern Castle (background, atop the hill) around 1860

Hechingen is the ancestral home of the Hohenzollern dynasty of princes, electors, kings, and emperors, of Brandenburg, Prussia, the German Empire, and Romania. In 1176 the Counts of Hohenberg separated from the Counts of Hohenzollern and seized several cities from the Hohenzollerns. In 1218 the Burgraves of Nuremberg gained independence from them.

The city was founded in 1255 by the Counts of Hohenzollern as their new capital city. The Hohenzollerns had great land holdings near Strasbourg and in the Alb-Donau-Kreis during this time.

Hechingen was located on an Imperial highway which led from the middle Neckar south by way of Rottweil to the upper Rhine and the Alpine passes. The Counts of Hohenzollern had financial problems and grew steadily weaker. In 1388, there was a siege, following which Eberhard II, Duke of Württemberg gained feudal rights over the territory. The Counts of Hohenzollern became his vassals and opened the town and their castle to him.

After the town was destroyed by fire in 1401, the Count tried to attract new citizens by granting them rights and privileges. The town thus became the center of the county. The cost of rebuilding was so great that Friedrich XII of Hohenzollern, known as der Öttinger, sold his entire fortune to Württemberg in 1415. Even this was not enough to satisfy his creditors. The Imperial court in Rottweil condemned him. Although his cousins in Brandenburg attempted arbitration for him, Henriette, Countess of Montbéliard, Duchess of Württemberg, took the castle in 1423 and destroyed it. After he was freed from prison, Friedrich undertook a pilgrimage to the Holy Land. His brother, Eitel Friedrich IV of Hohenzollern, also pledged his allegiance to Württemberg, turning over his inheritance if he did not have an heir. However, in 1433 at age 50, he had a son, Jos Niklaus, and by his death in 1439 he had regained half of their land.

His son, Count Jos Niklaus of Hohenzollern was able to gain Imperial permission to rebuild the castle, as well as to nullify the agreement with Württemberg. Thus, the city of Hechingen remained in the hands of the Hohenzollerns. As a result, the city remained more provincial, and largely agricultural.

=== Renaissance and Reformation ===
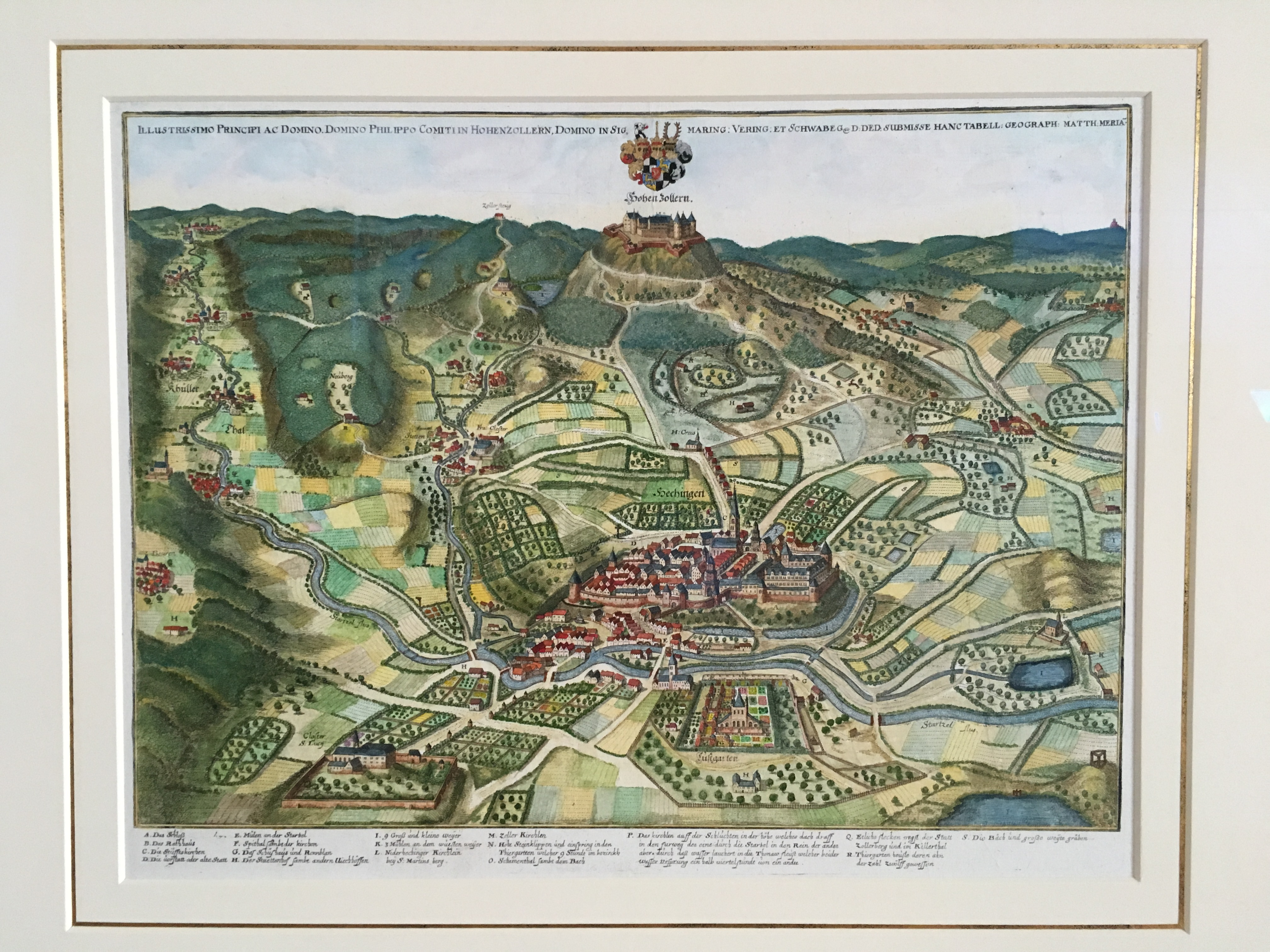
Hechingen with the Friedrichsburg, and Hohenzollern Castle around 1643 by Matthäus Merian

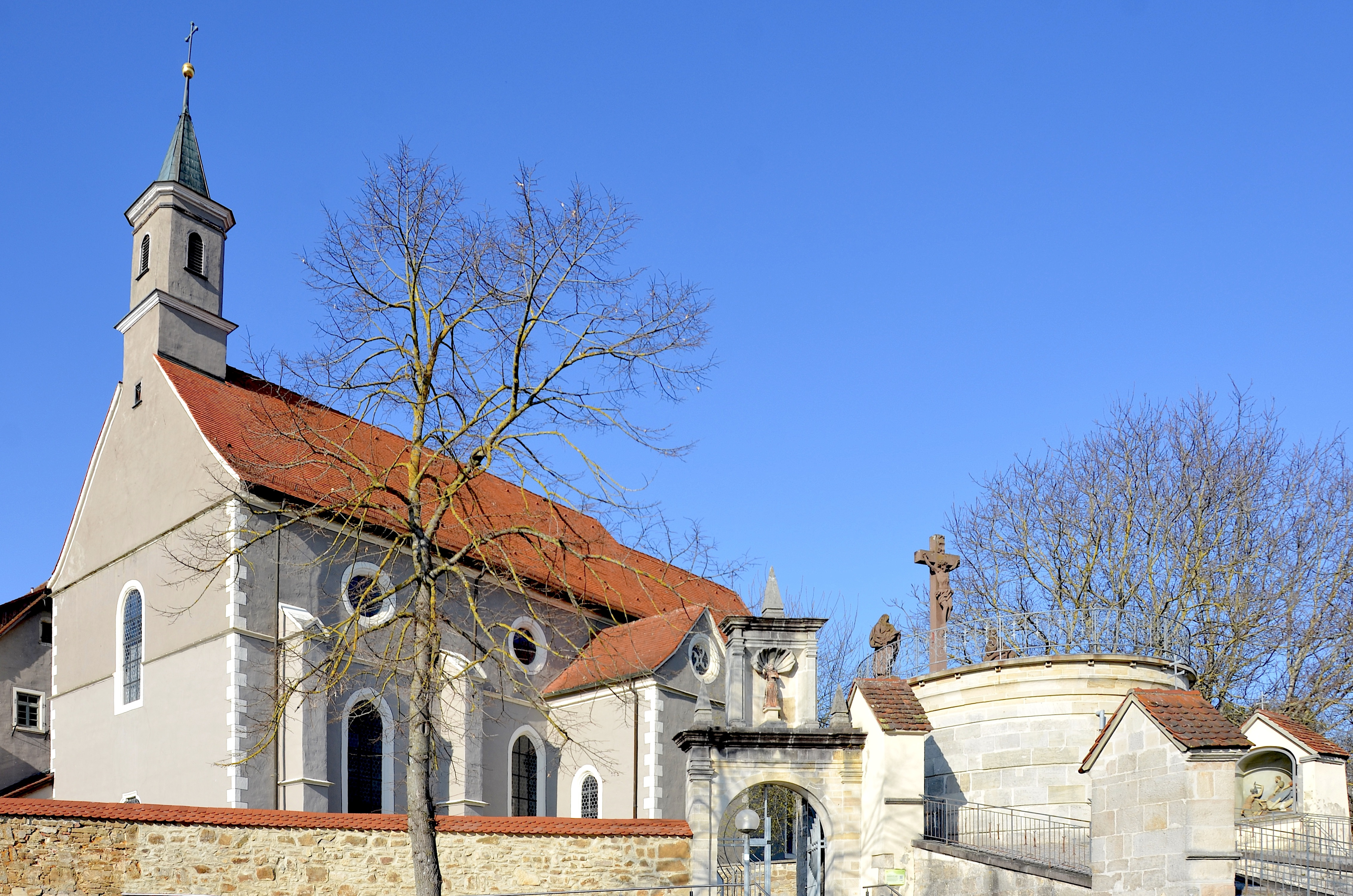
Convent Church St. Luzen (2019)

In 1567, the county was divided in three and became the counties of Hohenzollern-Hechingen, Hohenzollern-Sigmaringen, and Hohenzollern-Haigerloch. (The latter was rejoined to Hohenzollern-Sigmaringen in 1634.) Hechingen became the residence of the counts of Hohenzollern-Hechingen. Their territory, which consisted of Hechingen and 26 villages, did not change substantially until the 19th century.

Eitel Friedrich IV (1576–1605) made Hechingen a center of art, music, and Renaissance architecture. Many buildings built during his reign are still to be seen today: the convent church St. Luzen, the hospital, and the lower tower – the latter being the last remnant of the city defences. The Renaissance palace that he built, the Friedrichsburg, was removed at the beginning of the 19th century and replaced by the New Castle.

During the Reformation, Hechingen remained Catholic, but was still affected by the 30 Years' War. In 1625, Imperial troops reached Hechingen, and the prince (elevated from a count in 1623) bore the cost of supporting them. This burden, along with plundering by the soldiers and several poor harvests, caused great suffering and many deaths in the city.

In 1632, the Swedish army attacked, and the following year the entire force entered the city. The castle remained in the hands of the Hohenzollerns, and the troops marched on to Sigmaringen, which fell into the hands of Eberhard III, Duke of Württemberg (1614–1674) in 1633. Finally, on 5 July 1633, the city yielded to the Württembergs, and the castle was besieged. The siege lasted nine months, the castle receiving food from the local farmers through underground passages and bartering for it with precious objects from the castle.

On 3 April 1634, the castle surrendered to the Württembergs, whose soldiers plundered everything they could get their hands on, even draft animals farmers needed to plow their fields.

A short time later, Imperial troops reached the city and forced the Württemberg troops to withdraw; however, weakened by the long war they could not enforce the peace. The Plague broke out in 1635, which decimated the already weakened population. That year the castle fell into the hands of Maximilian I, Elector of Bavaria (1573–1651), who held it until 1637, when Hohenzollern rule was restored.

The troops of Bernard of Saxe-Weimar, who was allied with the French, plundered the city completely in 1638 in 12 days. The residents were reduced to eating nettles and snails, having already eaten the cats and dogs.

In 1639, the city was again occupied by the Bavarians until 1650. Although the Peace of Westphalia was signed in 1648, the troops remained two years longer because the outstanding taxes had not been paid.

=== Enlightenment ===
The architecture of the city was greatly influenced by the architect Pierre Michel d'Ixnard, who was a predecessor of Classicism in southern Germany.

=== Nineteenth century ===
The princes of Hohenzollern maintained good relations with Napoleon, and the last reigning prince, Constantine, Prince of Hohenzollern-Hechingen married Eugénie de Beauharnais.

The first large palace in the city was Friedrichsburg. The construction of a new palace—Neues Schloss—to replace it was started in 1818, but it was never properly finished because of the financial constraints of Prince Frederik. Neues Schloss is currently the headquarters of the Zollernalb Savings Bank.

Starting in 1826, Constantine and Eugénie made Hechingen into a cultural center in southern Germany. They had famous guests, including Eugénie's cousin, the future Napoleon III, Hector Berlioz, and Franz Liszt.

After the Revolution of 1848, Constantine retired from public life, and his county passed into the control of the Protestant kingdom of Prussia in 1850. Hohenzollern-Hechingen was then incorporated into the district of Sigmaringen, which became the capital. In that same year, Friedrich August Stüler began the restoration of the castle.

By 1850, Hechingen had started to industrialize, primarily with Jewish enterprises. By 1871 the city had become one of the most important economic centres in the region, with textiles and machine shops among the major industries.

=== Twentieth century ===
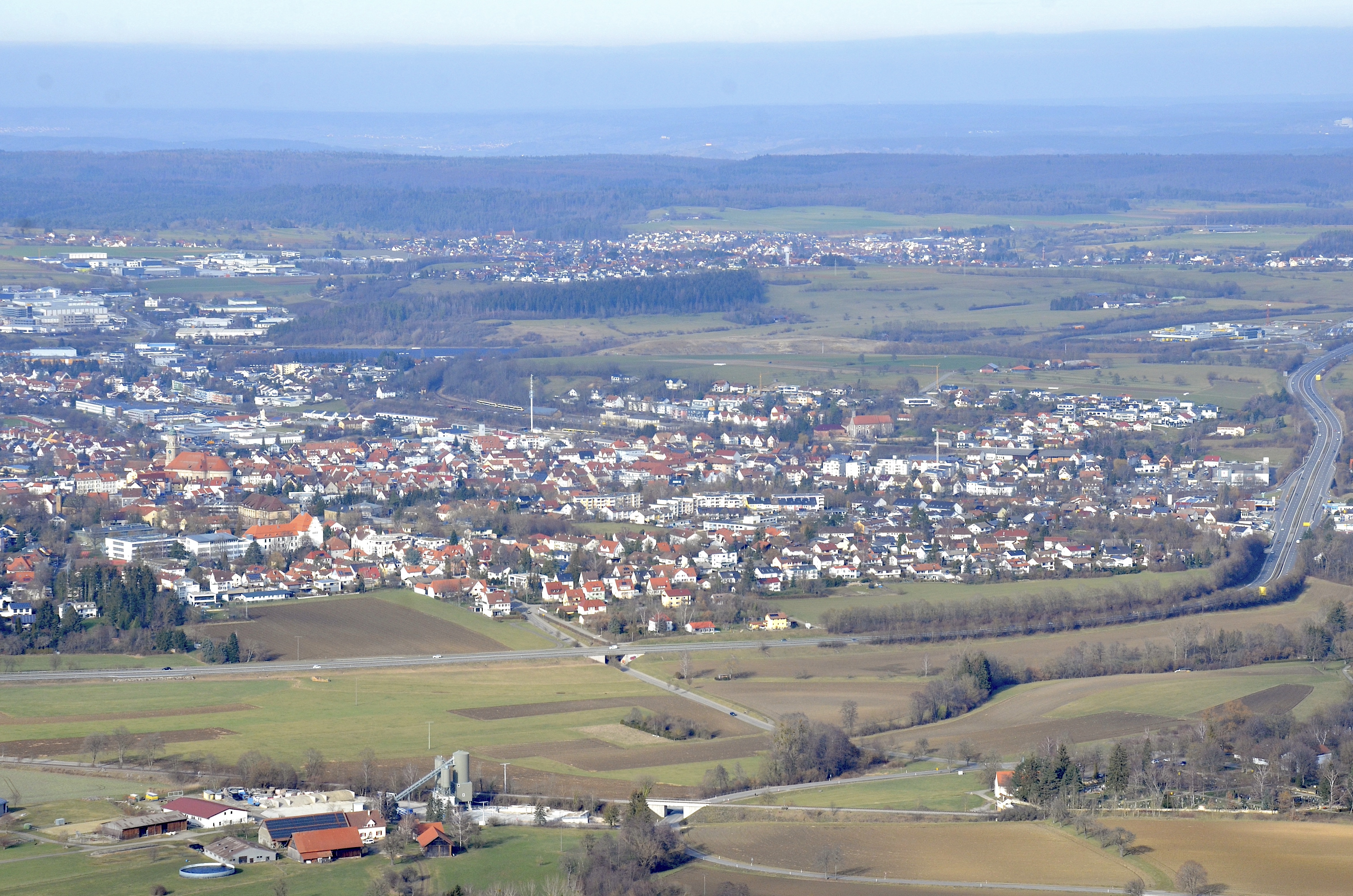
Hechingen seen from Hohenzollern Castle

In 1925, Hechingen became the capital of a new Landkreis.

Much of the architecture of the city was destroyed or damaged during World War II by Nazi attempts to build air raid shelters in public buildings. The town hall was so damaged that it had to be destroyed. To protect them from further destruction, many industries, including DEHOMAG, a predecessor of IBM, were relocated to Hechingen from damaged areas of Germany, such as Berlin. Parts of the Kaiser Wilhelm Society, notably its Institute for Physics, were also relocated there.

In April 1945, American troops of the Manhattan Project's Alsos Mission's Operation Big entered Hechingen in pursuit of men, materiel, and facilities related to the German nuclear energy project. There they seized a large atomic research laboratory and experimental nuclear Haigerloch atomic pile Reactor. Many of the physicists captured there were later interned in England in Operation Epsilon and tried in German war crimes tribunals over the following years.

The city became part of the French occupation zone, and the military governor of the city was Colonel Courtois.

The Landkreis became part of Württemberg-Hohenzollern in 1947 until the creation of the state of Baden-Württemberg in 1952. In 1973, it was incorporated into the Zollernalbkreis, with Balingen as the capital.

== Economy ==
The city of Hechingen has been an important economic center for the region for over a century. People from Mössingen, Sonnenbühl, Albstadt, and the Swabian Alps came to work. After the Second World War, IBM, BMW, and HP applied for building permits, which the city government denied. IBM and HP later built facilities in Sindelfingen-Böblingen.

Notable enterprises which have plants in Hechingen are Gambro, ELCO, the Hohenzollerische Landesbahn, and Sternenbäck. The city has a big industrial park in the north, which is divided into three areas: Lotzenäcker, Etzental, and Nasswasen. Three other industrial areas can be found in Hechingen: Reinetal, In den Seelenäckern and Auf der Bins.

== Politics ==
The incumbent mayor of Hechingen is Philipp Hahn (CDU). Former mayors of Hechingen include:

- 1798–1822 Friedrich Johann Neyer
- 1822–1823 Karl von Paur
- 1823–1830 Gustav Freiherr Frank von Fürstenwerth
- 1830–1831 Johann Nepomuk von Giegling
- 1831–1833 Friedrich Milden
- 1833–1834 Anton Strässle
- 1834–1839 Anton Speidel
- 1839–1846 Joseph Stehle
- 1846–1848 Xaver Dieringer
- 1848–1859 Gustav Ruff, Stadtschultheiß
- 1859–1891 Carl Baur, Stadtschultheiß
- 1892–1908 Konrad Mayer, Stadtschultheiß (Mayor since 1901)
- 1908–1926 Anton Häussler
- 1929–1945 Paul Bindereif
- 1946–1948 August Pretzl
- 1948–1967 Paul Bindereif
- 1967–1995 Norbert Roth (CDU)
- 1995–2011 Jürgen Weber (FWV)
- 2011–2018 Dorothea Bachmann

== Twin towns – sister cities ==
Hechingen is twinned with:

- Joué-lès-Tours, France (1973)
- Hódmezővásárhely, Hungary (1994)

Since 1990, Hechingen also has friendly relations with Limbach-Oberfrohna, Germany.

== Notable people ==
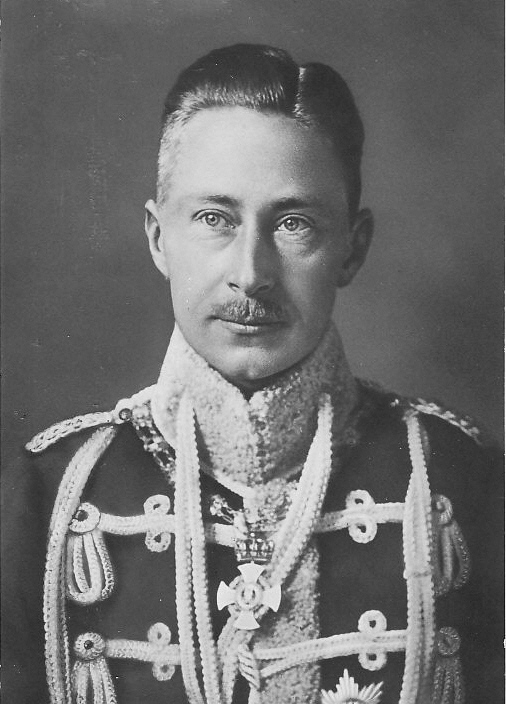
William, German Crown Prince, 1912

- Johann Georg, Prince of Hohenzollern-Hechingen (1577-1623) the first Prince of Hohenzollern-Hechingen.
- Friedrich Wilhelm, Prince of Hohenzollern-Hechingen (1663–1735), the fourth Prince of Hohenzollern-Hechingen
- Karoline Kaulla (1739–1809), a German banker and Court Jew, died locally
- Adolf Pfister (1810-1878), Roman Catholic priest and educator.
- Samuel Ullman (1840–1924), an American businessman, poet, humanitarian, and religious leader
- Elsa Einstein (1876–1936), cousin and wife of Albert Einstein
- William, German Crown Prince (1882–1951), last German Crown Prince, died locally.
- Paul Levi (1883–1930), communist leader
- Otto Nerz (1892–1949), football player and manager and sports administrator
- Friedrich Kessler (1901–1998), law professor
- Otto Baum (1911–1988), commander of the Waffen-SS, Knights Cross holder, died locally
- Georg Braun (1918–1995), Grand Prix motorcycle road racer
- Markus Wolf (1923–2006), spymaster for East Germany
- Konrad Wolf (1925–1982), an East German film director, brother of Markus Wolf
- Klaus Kinkel (1936–2019), grew up locally, Vice-Chancellor of Germany, 1993–1998
- Guenter Neumann (born 1958), professor of plant physiology at the University of Hohenheim
