= Hohenzollern-Hechingen =

Former principality in southwest Germany

Coordinates: 48°21′N 8°58′E

Principality of Hohenzollern-Hechingen Fürstentum Hohenzollern-Hechingen (German)
- 1576–1850
- Flag Coat of arms
- Motto: Nihil Sine Deo (Latin) Nothing without God
- Hohenzollern-Hechingen in 1848
- Status: Principality
- Capital: Hechingen
- Common languages: Swabian German
- Religion: Roman Catholic
- Prince of Hohenzollern-Hechingen
  - 1623: Johann Georg (first)
  - 1838–1849: Constantine (last)
- Legislature: Landesdeputation
- Historical era: Middle Ages
  - Partition of County of Hohenzollern: 1576
  - Raised to Principality: 1623
  - Incorporation into Kingdom of Prussia: 1850

Population
  - 1835: 15,000
  - 1848: 20,000
Preceded by	Succeeded by
Zollern	Province of Hohenzollern

Hohenzollern-Hechingen (German: Fürstentum Hohenzollern-Hechingen) was a small principality in southwestern Germany. Its rulers belonged to the Swabian branch of the Hohenzollern dynasty.

== History ==
Hechingen and Hohenzollern Castle, c. 1830

The County of Hohenzollern-Hechingen was created in 1576, upon the partition of the County of Hohenzollern, a fief of the Holy Roman Empire. When the last count of Hohenzollern, Charles I of Hohenzollern (1512–1579) died, the territory was to be divided up between his three sons:

- Eitel Frederick IV of Hohenzollern-Hechingen (1545–1605)
- Charles II of Hohenzollern-Sigmaringen (1547–1606)
- Christopher of Hohenzollern-Haigerloch (1552–1592)

Unlike the Hohenzollerns of Brandenburg and Prussia, the Hohenzollerns of southwest Germany remained Roman Catholic. The county was raised to a principality in 1623. The main seat was the Friedrichsburg castle in Hechingen.

The principality joined the Confederation of the Rhine in 1806 and was a member state of the German Confederation between 1815 and 1850. The democratic Revolution of 1848 was relatively successful in Hohenzollern, and on 16 May 1848, the Prince was forced to accept the establishment of a constitution. However, the conflict between monarch and democrats continued, and on 6 August 1849, Hohenzollern was occupied by Prussian forces. On 7 December 1849, Prince Constantine sold the country to his relative, King Frederick William IV of Prussia. On 12 March 1850, Hohenzollern-Hechingen officially became part of Prussia, and formed together with Hohenzollern-Sigmaringen the Province of Hohenzollern.

== Rulers ==
Coat of arms of a prince of Hohenzollern-Hechingen
