= Marigje Arriens =

Dutch alleged witch (c. 1520–1591)

Marigje Arriens or Marichgen Ariaens (c. 1520 – 18 December 1591), also recorded as Marrigje, was a Dutch herbalist and one of the last victims of the witch trials in the Netherlands.

== Biography ==
Arriens was born around the year 1520, in Poederoijen. At the time of her arrest, she was a healer and herbalist living in Schoonhoven. She was also unmarried, but may have had a daughter named Cornelia.

Arriens was arrested on 4 October 1591, when a young boy told alderman Fop Janszoon that Arriens had bewitched his hair to shrink. It is also likely that Arriens faced additional accusations of witchcraft from locals who were dissatisfied by her remedies.

The city's bailiff, Geerlof Cluijt van Voornbroeck, arrested Arriens. She was in custody for ten weeks, during which time she was subjected to torture. After she confessed at trial to having pledged loyalty to Satan in order to escape poverty, a seven-man jury ultimately found her guilty. Arriens was in custody for ten weeks from the time of her arrest to being sentenced to death.

Arriens' public execution was carried out on 18 December 1591; she was around seventy years of age. She was strangled to death, and her body was burnt due to the belief that doing so would banish satanic forces.

Though sometimes recorded as the last person executed for witchcraft in the Dutch Republic, Arriens' execution was followed by that of Anna Muggen in 1608.

== Legacy ==
A plaque and stone circle embedded on the street near Schoonhoven's town hall honours Arriens' memory.

=== In media ===
The song "Born for Burning" (1985) by Swedish black metal band Bathory was inspired by the Arriens case.

== See also ==
- Mechteld ten Ham
- Neeltje Andries
- Aagt Germonts
- Entgen Luijten
