= Grafelijke Korenmolen, Zeddam =

Windmill in Zeddam, Netherlands

De Grafelijke Korenmolen
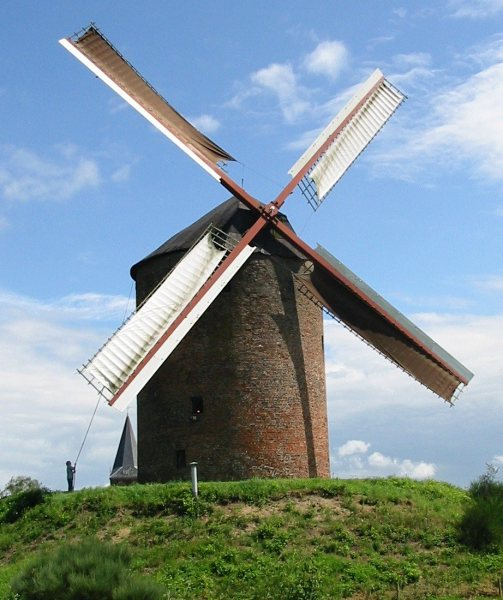
- De Grafelijke Korenmolen, 2004
- Interactive map of De Grafelijke Korenmolen

Origin
- Mill name: De Grafelijke Korenmolen (unofficial)
- Mill location: Bovendorpsstraat 14 7083 EC Zeddam
- Coordinates: 51.903172°N 6.253051°E
- Operator: Stichting Huis Bergh
- Year built: +- 1450

Information
- Purpose: Corn mill
- Type: Tower mill
- No. of sails: Four sails
- Type of sails: Common sails
- Windshaft: cast iron and wood
- Winding: Internal winding with medieval winding gears
- No. of pairs of millstones: Two pairs
- Size of millstones: 1,450 millimetres (4.76 ft) diameter
- Other information: Uses a mound instead of stage to set the sails. Oldest existing windmill of the Netherlands.

The Grafelijke Korenmolen van Zeddam (Countships grainmill of Zeddam) is a tower mill in Zeddam, the Netherlands, which has been restored to working order. The mill may have been built before 1441, making it the oldest windmill in existence in the Netherlands. It is listed as Rijksmonument number 9290.

== History ==
The first reference to a mill on this site dates from 1441 which most likely refers to the current mill as there is no knowledge of there being an earlier mill. The first definite mention of a brick windmill is from the financial year 1453/1454. It was erected by Willem van der Leck, Lord Van den Bergh and has since always been in the possession of the counts van Bergh and their successors with only a short period of private ownership in the twentieth century. The farmers in the Land van den Bergh were subjected to mill soke, meaning they were obliged to have their grain milled at this mill. In 1712 the House of Van den Bergh was succeeded by the House of Hohenzollern. Major reconstruction works took place in 1839 with the addition of two extra floors, an entranceway at the ground floor and an extra pair of millstones. The outside staircase was moved inside. The dead curb for winding the cap was replaced with a live curb of wooden rollers in 1871. Changes made in the 1940s were partly undone in 1990 and cast iron rollers were fitted. The mill was sold in 1904 to H. Gerretschen while the castle Huis Bergh became property of Jan Herman van Heek in 1912. Van Heek bought the windmill in 1929 to prevent it from being fully demolished and he had the beginning demolition work repaired. Van Heek transferred his possessions to the foundation Stichting Huis Bergh in 1946. Further restoration work on the mill was performed in 1963, 1974 and 1990. In 2005 the stocks were replaced. A horse mill was reconstructed near the windmill in 1974. This combination of mills used to be quite common as the horse mill was used when there was no wind.

== Description ==
The Grafelijke korenmolen van Zeddam is a five storey brick tower mill. The parallel walls are up to 2.8 metres (9 ft 2 in) thick at the base. A 3.8 metres (12 ft 6 in) high mound was thrown up around the mill for the miller to reach the sails. In the old situation the internal space at ground level was unused and the only entrance into the mill was at the current hoisting floor, only reachable by an outside staircase. Two extra floors were built into the mill body to house an extra millstone and a ground floor entrance and internal staircase built. The mill is winded by two sets of wooden gears in the cap engaging cogs on the curb. The gearing is powered by an endless rope running on a Y-wheel. The roofing felt covered cap rests on a live curb with flanged cast iron rollers. The four common sails have a span of 26.2 metres (85 ft 11 in). They are carried on a cast-iron windshaft cast by Enthoven & Co as number 0286 in 1861 though it was only fitted in the mill 1888 after the former wooden axle broke. As the cast iron shaft was to short it was partly encased in the remainder of the wooden shaft. The windshaft carries the brake wheel which drives the wallower at the top of the upright shaft. At the bottom of the upright shaft, the great spur wheel drives the two pairs of mill stones of 1.60 metres (5 ft 3 in) diameter via two lantern pinion stone nuts.

== Public access ==
The windmill is open to the public on Saturdays and from May to October also on Sundays.
