= Witch trials in the Netherlands =

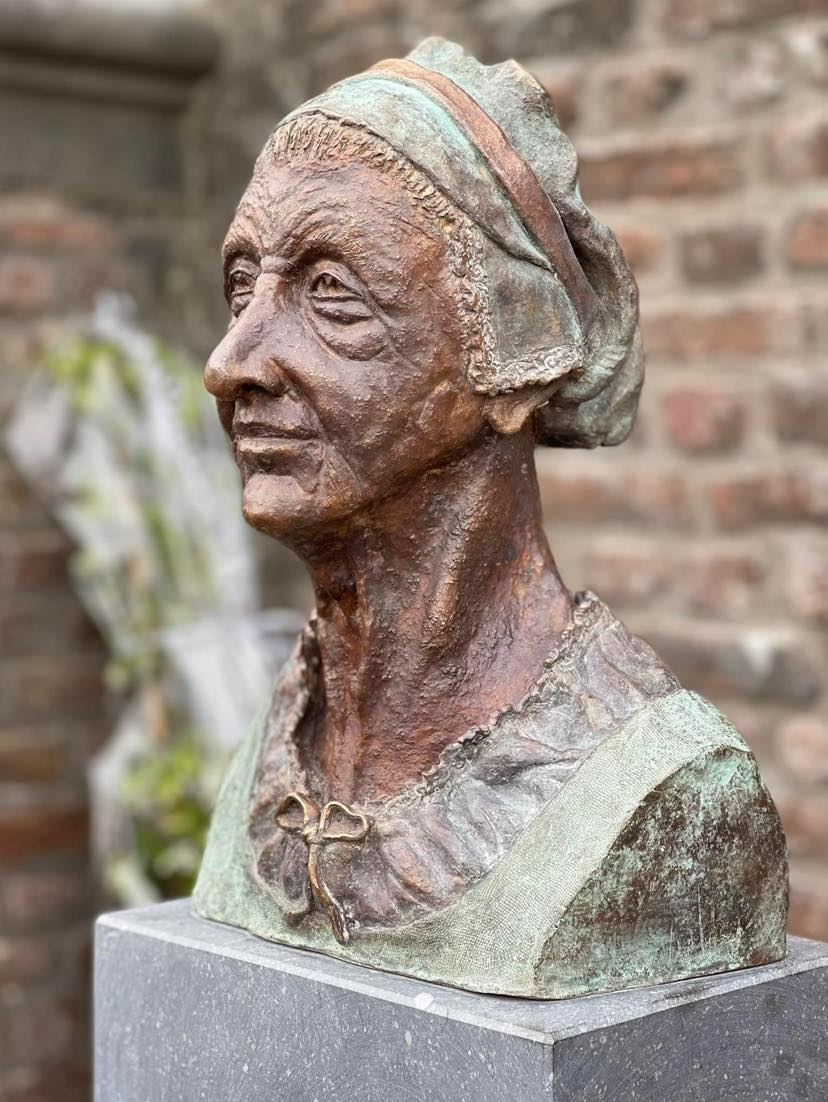
Portretbeeld Entgen Luyten - Limbricht

The witch trials in the Netherlands were among the smallest in Europe. The Netherlands are known for having discontinued their witchcraft executions earlier than any other European country. The provinces began to phase out capital punishment for witchcraft beginning in 1593. The last trial in the Northern Netherlands took place in 1610.

164 to about 200 people were killed in Dutch witch trials, rising to potentially 300 victims including casualties from regions that were under Spanish jurisdiction but eventually became part of the Netherlands. The victims were overwhelmingly women.

Belief in witches persisted in some areas into the nineteenth century and in 1823 one woman underwent the water ordeal on her own request with the support of the authorities to prove her innocence to her superstitious neighbours.

== History ==
=== Northern Netherlands prior to independence ===
Despite significant losses of archival material, it seems that the Northern Netherlands saw most of their trials for sorcery and witchcraft between 1550 and 1575, when prosecutions in the Southern Netherlands were only just beginning. The province of Groningen's first trials were in 1457, leading to the executions of twenty women and a man. In the 1550s the area between Rhine and Meuse was hit hard, while in the 1560s, and particularly in 1564, prosecutions peaked in the County of Holland.

Early in the sixteenth centuries when witch trials were still in the initial stages in the Low Countries, authorities often sought advice and "expertise" from abroad, such a Cologne and Cleves. An executioner from Cleves, master Symon, was contracted for several trials for his skill in breaking victims and extracting a confession from them.

=== Northern Netherlands after independence ===
The Netherlands became an independent country after the Dutch War of Independence in 1579. During the late 16th century, the Netherlands did experience a couple of high-profile witch trials.

The provincial courts in Zeeland and Frisia maintained strict central control, were staffed by trained jurists and insisted on due process. Their academic jurists observed the procedural rules for a high standard of evidence before torture was allowed.

In June 1593, the High Court (Hoge Raad) repealed a death sentence for witchcraft from Schiedam in the Province of Holland. This became a case of precedence which was henceforth followed as common practice in Holland, thereby de facto abolished the death penalty for witchcraft in the province. This case of precedence was followed by the Province of Utrecht from 1596, by Groningen from 1597 and by Gelderland from 1603 onward.

The total number of victims from witch trials in the Northern Netherlands is estimated at 164 (minimum figure of documented victims but almost certainly an undercount) to about 200 people killed in the Northern Netherlands; this figure includes executed victims, victims who died of torture before execution and victims who died in prison. The figure rises to at least 200 to potentially 300 victims if one includes casualties from parts of the Spanish Netherlands that the Republic conquered later (such as Staats-Overmaas and Staats-Brabant). Out of 164 documented victims, 155 were women. In the western provinces only women were accused and killed. About half of the accused in the eastern provinces were men, chiefly accused of being werewolves, but very few men were executed.

The number of casualties and the period in which witch trials peaked varied considerably per province. Victims numbered 50 in Groningen (peaks in 1540s and around 1590), 46 in Guelders (peak in 1540s and 1550s), 39 in Holland (peaks in mid 1560s, 1585 and 1591), 23 in Utrecht (peak in 1520s and 1530s), 4 in Zeeland, 1 each in Drenthe and Oversticht and none in Frisia. The mid-1560s peak in Holland, the most populous province, home to roughly a third of the population of the Northern Netherlands, was a relatively urban phenomenon inspired by an economic crisis due to a drop in Baltic grain imports (the most important facet of foreign trade for Holland during the entire early modern period). A few other witch trials were linked to plague outbreaks and the accused in these cases were often people who nursed plague victims, although pestilence never became a significant cause for trials. In the province of Groningen witch trials proliferated in outlying regions where local official had a free rein, but they were by contrast very rare in the jurisdiction of city of Groningen. Record keeping in Guelders was especially poor. The total number of victims was therefore quite probably higher than 164.

Cunning folk were not commonly among the accused or victims of witch trials, there are only very few examples known. There are no known cases of midwives being tried.

The last person executed for witchcraft in the Northern Netherlands has often been referred to as Anna Muggen of Gorinchem in 1608. She had repeatedly declared herself to be a witch. In reality, however, the Bredevoort witch trials resulted in the execution of ten people as late as 1610, two years after the execution of Anna Muggen. The famous Roermond witch trial of 1613, resulting in 64 executions, took place in a part of present-day Netherlands which belonged to present-day Belgium (then the Spanish Netherlands) at the time, and thus does not actually belong to the history of witch trials on the Netherlands.

The fact that the common practice of repealing death sentences ended witchcraft executions in the Netherlands, however, did not mean that there were no witch trials. Witch trials still occurred in the Netherlands the entire first half of the 17th century, though they were relatively few and no longer resulted in executions. Aagt Germonts was judged guilty of witchcraft in 1660, but her sentence was commuted to pillorying. Entgen Luijten died in custody in 1674 under mysterious circumstances while awaiting sentencing.

==== End of the witch trials ====
The lack of witchcraft executions in the Netherlands attracted attention in contemporary Europe. It was also a cause of misplaced national pride as well as political propaganda, as the Dutch pointed to the severe Witch trials in the Spanish Netherlands and stated that in contrast to the case of their Catholic neighbor, there was no need of witch trials in the Netherlands as no one had been proven guilty of sorcery and claimed sorcery had been proven to be illusions.

The common belief in witchcraft among the public did however persist despite the lack of interest from the authorities to conduct such trials. Witchcraft accusations as part of defamation cases occurred during the entire 18th century, and as late as in the 19th century there were lynchings of people pointed out as witches. Some women would continue to seek ordeals to clear their names, which could however have negative consequences. Aaltje Brouwer from Eibergen underwent a water ordeal in 1694 and subsequently a weighing ordeal in Oudewater (where there was a weigh house) when her accusers were unpersuaded. The classis of the Reformed church, which never regarded her as a witch, decided then to deny her the Lord's Supper for tarnishing the name of the Reformed religion and indulging in "superstitious popery".

In 1823 a woman, Hendrika Hofhuis famously demanded that the authorities allowed her to be subjected to the ordeal of water to clear her name in her community after she had been accused of being a witch. The authorities agreed in order to solve this defamation dispute, and she passed the test and cleared her name in the eyes of her neighbors. While not actually a witch trial, as the authorities merely allowed her this to end the harassment from her neighbors, this can nevertheless be regarded as the last time that something resembling a witch trial took place in the Netherlands.

== Areas of the Netherlands under Spanish control after 1581 ==
For witch trials in the Southern Low Countries, see Witch trials in the Spanish Netherlands

The last witch trials on the territory of the modern-day Netherlands took place near Roermond in 1613, a region that was controlled by Spain at the time.

== See also ==
- Witch trials in the early modern period
