= Hendrika =

Hendrika is a Dutch feminine given name, derived from the male name Hendrik ("Henry"). Most people with the name use short forms in daily life, like Henda (in Afrikaans), Hennie, Henny, Hetty, Ria, Rie, Riek and Rika. Hendrika can refer to:

- Hendrika B. Cantwell (1925–2025), Dutch-American clinical professor of pediatrics, advocate for abused and neglected children
- Hendrika C. "Rie" de Balbian Verster (1890–1990), Dutch painter
- Hendrika Margaretha "Hetty" van Gurp (born 1949), Dutch-born Canadian educator
- Hendrika Hofhuis (1780–1849), last Dutch woman to (by her request) be put on trial for witch craft
- Hendrika A.M. "Ria" van der Horst (born 1932), Dutch swimmer
- Hendrika Johanna van Leeuwen (1887–1974), Dutch physicist
- Hendrika W. "Rie" Mastenbroek (1919–2003), Dutch swimmer
- Hendrika "Hennie" Penterman (born 1951), Dutch swimmer
- Hendrika A. "Riek" van Rumt (1897–1985), Dutch gymnast
- G. Hendrika "Riek" Schagen (1913–2008), Dutch actress
- Hendrika Cornelia Scott "Henda" Swart (1939–2016), South African mathematician
- Hendrika C.M. "Ria" Vedder-Wubben (1951–2016), Dutch politician
- P. Hendrika "Henny" Vegter (born 1958), Dutch Olympic sailor
- Hendrika "Hennie" van der Velde (born 1944), Dutch swimmer

== See also ==
- 7840 Hendrika, a main belt asteroid named after the discoverer's wife
