= John Leeuwerik =

Dutch footballer

Personal information
- Date of birth: 19 June 1959 (age 67)
- Place of birth: 's-Heerenberg,Netherlands
- Position: Midfielder

Youth career
- De Graafschap

Senior career*
Years	Team	Apps	(Gls)
–1994	De Graafschap	423	(113)
- * Club domestic league appearances and goals

John Leeuwerik (born 19 June 1959 in 's-Heerenberg) is a Dutch former footballer who played as a midfielder.

== Career ==
Leeuwerik started his career with Dutch second tier side De Graafschap, where he made 423 appearances and scored 113 goals, helping them earn promotion to the Dutch top flight.
