= Roermond witch trial =

1613 hunt in the Spanish Netherlands

The Roermond witch trial, which took place in and around the city of Roermond in the Spanish Netherlands in 1613, was the largest witch trial in present-day The Netherlands. It caused the death of sixty four people by burning.

== Earlier witch trials in Roermond ==
Before the 1613 trials there were other trials. They mainly came from peasants who felt they, their family, or their cattle or crops had been bewitched.

They would then go to the accused and demand from them to bless them or their children, animals or crops. This was meant to dispel the bewitching. It did mean that the accused would be held responsible for the bewitching and to dispel would be seen as admittance of guilt, so usually these blessings would be denied. The witch could also start her own slander trial against the accusers, which could prevent a witch trial.

If the witch's honour could not be restored in this way, a formal witch trial would follow. The accusers would have to show evidence to the court. Damages would have to be proved with the help of witnesses, or otherwise the witch would go free. If the accused could find enough witnesses (about four to eight) in his or her defense, the witch would usually be declared not guilty and released. Judgment could depend on the influence or popularity of the accused.

These trials were usually less about the bewitchings and more about the heretical pact with the devil. Torture would only be used if the guilt of the witch was considered proven and all that was needed was a confession. During these trials the accused were not forced to name other witches yet.

- 1522 – Trijn van der Moelen was suspected of witchcraft before. She was arrested because she had bothered someone on the street. She admitted she had bewitched people and animals and having closed a pact with the devil. She was condemned to burn at the stake.
- 1525 – Two women were accused of having bewitched people, horses, cows and sheep. Both accusations came from peasants. The accusation of having closed a pact with the devil only appeared after a painful questioning. They were condemned to burn at the stake.

In 1572 Roermond had passed from Spanish hands to the hands of Orangists and Protestants, but in 1580 it had been reconquered by the Catholic Spaniards. The mercenaries of both armies had stayed around and were still pillaging the area.

- 1581 – Kael Merrie was suspected of witchcraft: a child had fallen ill, a pig was paralysed, the milk of a cow could not be churned into butter, etc. She kept denying the charges and was convicted to be banished. Just outside Roermond she was intercepted by mercenaries and drowned in the Maas river. Two more women suspected of witchcraft had come to Roermond to plead their innocence (a good idea as it increased the chance of acquittal): they, too, were drowned by the Spanish mercenaries in the Maas.

The justices tried to remain sceptical to the peasants' accusations but were powerless against the lynchings in which the mercenaries played a big part. From then on the accused were forced with torture to admit they were heretics who had closed a pact with the devil and had even had sexual intercourse with him and danced during witch's sabbaths together with other witches.

- 1587 – During a few trials (the outcome of which is unknown) six women were accused, among whom was Ummel Heynen. During a day without wind linen had flown out of the garden and into the Rur river. A Dutch soldier had seen her faint, which must have been because she had had intercourse with the devil. The daughter of the mayor died after Ummel had given her something to drink. Ummel had sighed and cursed when she was forced to step over a broom that a corporal had put down in front of her as a test (folklore held that witches could not step over broomsticks). Someone had heard the sound of a thousand cats (during witch's sabbaths witches came together in the form of cats to dance and have sex with the devil). Ummel's neighbours were two sisters whose mother had been burnt as a witch, and that alone was enough to suspect Ummel of witchcraft. In the peasants' accusation there was not just the accusation of bewitching but now also having intercourse with the devil, as the church's lore had apparently been added to folklore.
- 1594 – There was probably also a witch trial in Roermond. The accusation was the witches came together in witch's sabbaths as cats and had sex with the devil in the form of a tomcat. There was also a devil in the form of a goat. The witches could change into dogs, cats, hares, wolves, and other animals.
- 1611 – Itgen Heudders accidentally touched a child that then got a rash. She had to appear in front of the justices and dispel the bewitching. When she refused she was thrown into a dungeon, but when it was shown she came from a well-to-do family she was let go.

== The trials of 1613 ==
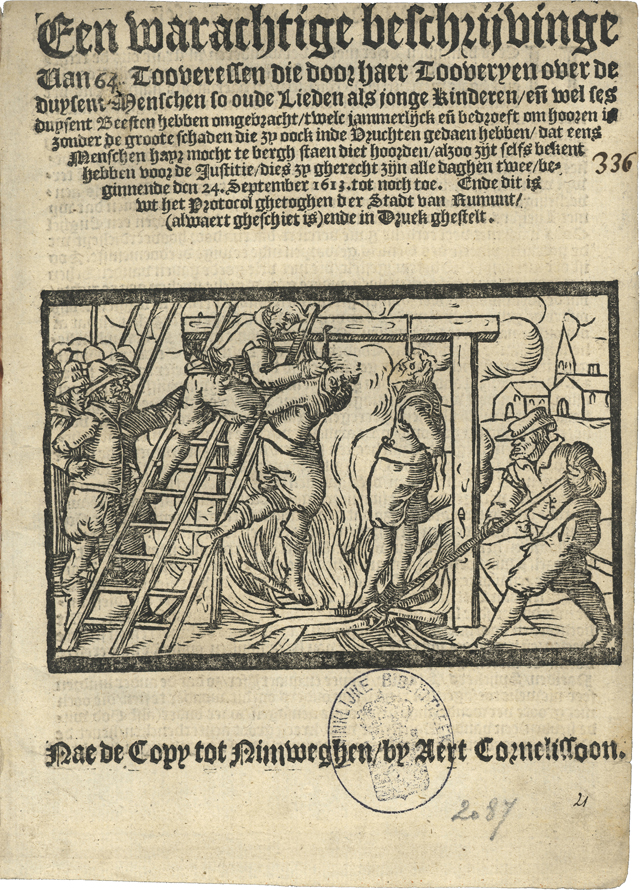
Witch burning in Roermond in 1613 (depicted in Een warachtige beschrijvinge van 64 tooveressen)

These infamous trials are only known about because of a pamphlet. The actual process papers have been lost. 64 witches were arrested. The charges were: miscarriages, diseases in animals and fish, diseases in crops, and many people losing their livelihood. The witches had allegedly bewitched all these people. The charges no longer came from the peasants, but from the church and government who had investigated the complaints themselves and made the charges.

There was now a true inquisition. The accusations were not only of bewitchings but also of heresy and forming a pact with the devil, and having danced and had intercourse with him. The witches were forced by means of torture to reveal the names of other witches that had partaken in the sabbath. Giving up the names of other witches was the main cause of the large number of trials.

Tryntjen van Zittaert was the first to be arrested, together with her daughter, who purportedly learned witchcraft from her. While playing with children on the street, she was said to have shown her crafts to other children.

The 12-year-old girl apparently magically made things appear out of her mouth, like coins. A magistrate noticed and mother and daughter were taken into custody. The girl said she had learned everything from her mother. Both of them were from Sittard, where things like prestidigitation were allowed, but in the more Protestant Roermond this was not tolerated.

Tryntjen was tortured and admitted to killing 41 children with magic, and also three men and seven women, and many crops and animals. She also accused the surgeon Jan van Ool of being a wizard. This Jan van Ool was from Gulik which was also less strictly religious than Roermond. After four days in custody the mother was burnt to death, and the daughter was locked into a convent for the rest of her life.

The ten other witches were taken into custody together with Jan van Ool. He admitted to having tried to convince his wife to seal a pact with the devil, which she refused. He claimed he then became scared she would turn him in, so he cut her into pieces and threw her down a well and told everyone she ran away. He was forced by the devil to kill one patient with magic for every ten he healed. In 16 years he would have killed 150 people. That would mean he would be treating about 100 people a year. During his torture he accused 41 other people of being witches. He was burnt alive.

These 41 alleged witches were also taken into custody. They admitted to having killed children, crippled or diseased people, including their own families. They said they had been forced into these actions by the devil.

Near Straelen the magistrates arrested another 10 alleged witches, who in their turn accused a midwife named Entjen Gillis.

Entjen Gillis confessed to having killed the foetuses of 40 pregnant women, and 150 babies just after birth. She had also supposedly killed their mothers and her husband and children with witchcraft. She was burnt alive.

Altogether there were 63 witches and Jan van Ool, so during a month two people were burnt to the stake every day. The trials were handled in a very short period of time. The magistrates decided this needed to be done because over 600 newborn children and 400 old people, and over 6000 animals were purportedly killed by witchcraft.

== See also ==
- Witch trials in the Netherlands
- Witch trials in the Spanish Netherlands
