= Mechteld ten Ham =

Dutch alleged witch (c. 1525–1605)

Mechteld ten Ham (c. 1525 – 25 July 1605) was a Dutch dollmaker who was among the final victims of the witch trials in the Netherlands.

== Biography ==
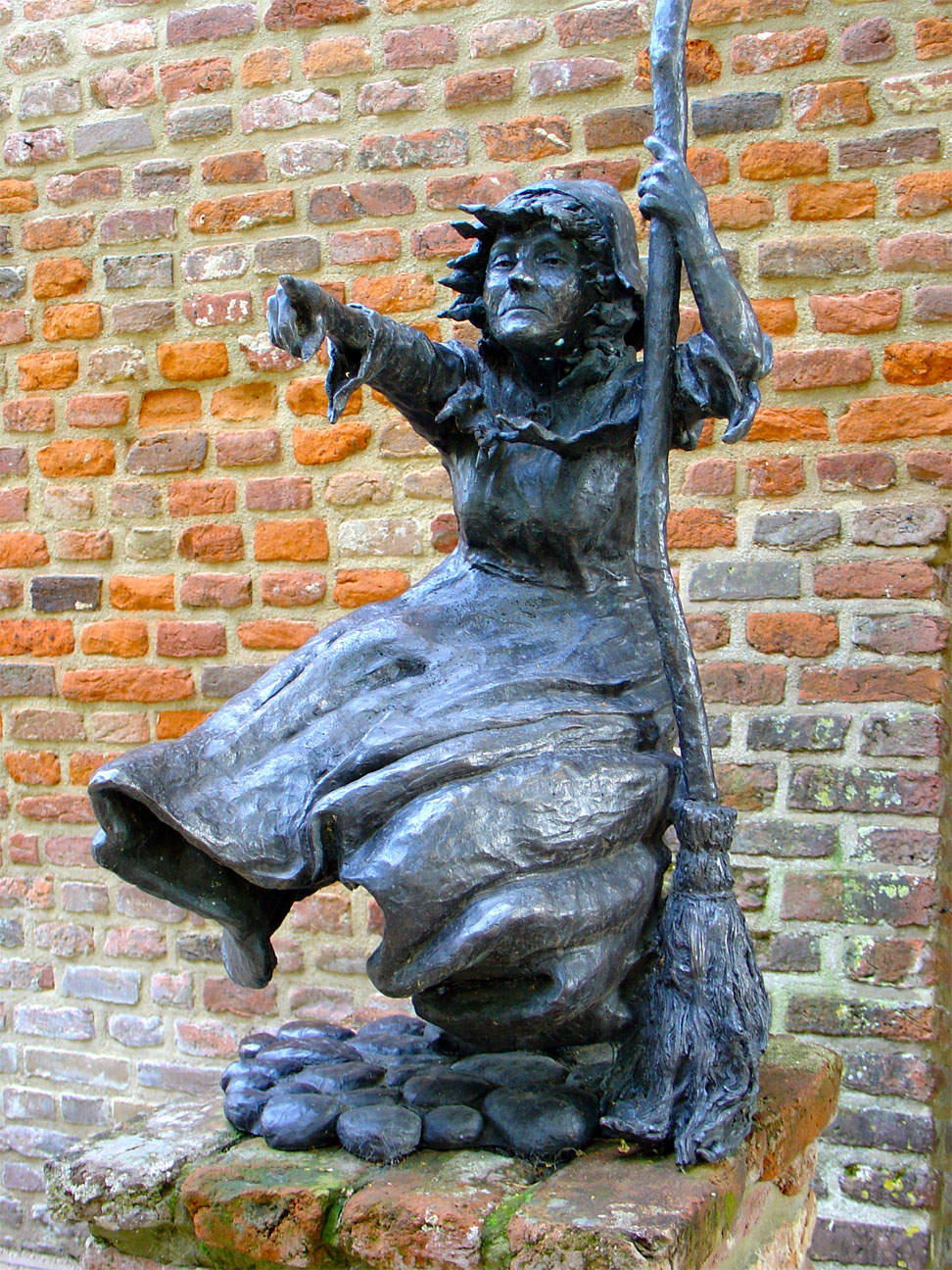
Statue of Mechteld ten Ham in 's-Heerenberg

Ten Ham was a widowed dollmaker and fortune teller who lived alone near a church in 's-Heerenberg. Her late husband, Henrick Horning, had been the city's courier. Residents of the area sought her predictions for the future; she also sold traditional remedies.

She first came under suspicion for witchcraft in 1603, when a local boy claimed he had peeked through her cottage's keyhole and witnessed a young man inside disappearing into thin air. When the boy died of the plague in May 1605, local townspeople began to speculate that ten Ham was responsible for his death and the deaths of others, including Henrick.

At the time, 's-Heerenberg's residents were eager to accuse ten Ham of witchcraft, as doing so provided someone to blame for the city's recent spate of misfortunes. These included an outbreak of plague, repeated crop failures, and a recent raid by Spanish troops as part of the Eighty Years' War. Locals also spread rumours that ten Ham had cursed their livestock and marriages.

In April 1605, ten Ham demanded to be put on trial, as she believed she would pass the ordeal of water. Suspects who underwent the ordeal were submerged in water; those who sank would be pronounced innocent, while those who floated were deemed to be confirmed witches. However, ten Ham's dress was buoyant enough that she failed the test.

Ten Ham was tortured over the following months until she confessed, on 9 June 1605, that she had used magic to spread the plague and cause hostilities with Spain. Though she soon recanted her admission, she confessed again after undergoing further torture. She was executed by strangulation on 25 July 1605 by executioner Walter Janssen, and her body was burnt afterwards.

== Legacy ==
A statue commemorating ten Ham stands in 's-Heerenberg.

In local folklore, ten Ham is said to haunt the Montferland forest, where she was executed.

== See also ==
- Marigje Arriens
