= Land van den Bergh =

Coat of arms of the Land van den Bergh

The Land van den Bergh was a lordship in Zutphen, Netherlands and included 's-Heerenberg, Didam, Etten, Zeddam, Gendringen, Netterden, and the Westervoort fiefdom. It was previously ruled over by the counts van Bergh.

== History ==
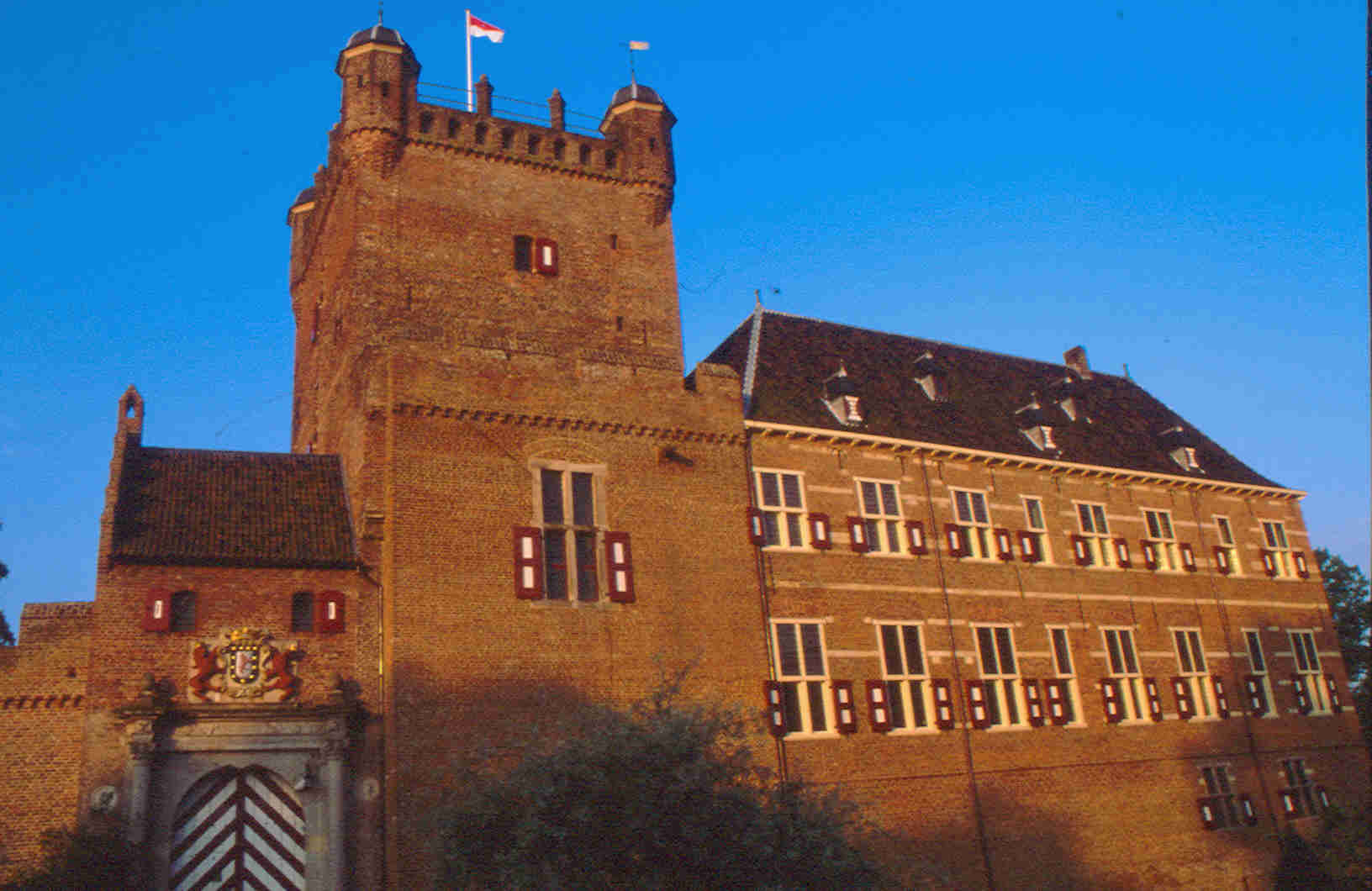
Huis Bergh in 's-Heerenberg

The first known Count van Bergh was Constantinus de Monte who settled in the region between 1100-1125. The counts initially resided in Montferland until the construction of the castle Huis Bergh. In 1416, House Monte went extinct and was succeeded by House van der Leck. Oswald I van der Bergh was made an Imperial Count, but Land van den Bergh did not become sovereign.

The most famous counts were Willem IV van den Bergh, Herman van den Bergh (1558-1611), and Hendrik van den Bergh (1573-1638). During the Eighty Years' War, they initially fought on the Staatse side, later siding with the Spanish, and finally switching back to the Staatse faction.

With Oswald III van den Bergh, the Van der Leck House went extinct, on the male side, in 1712. Oswald III appointed his great-nephew, Prince Franz Wilhelm von Hohenzollern, as his successor and sole heir. A condition for the succession was that Frans Wilhelm would take the name and coat of arms Van den Bergh, with which he founded the new family Hohenzollern-Bergh, and the Land van Bergh passed to the House of Hohenzollern-Sigmaringen. In 1737, he was succeeded by his son Johan Baptist, nicknamed the Mad Count.

In 1795, following the foundation of the Batavian Republic, the glorious rights were abolished. After the foundation of the United Kingdom of the Netherlands in 1815, the glorious rights were partially restored. Land van den Bergh was later incorporated into Gelderland. In 1912, Willem August van Hohenzollern sold his property to Jan Herman van Heek.
