= List of counts van Bergh =

This page is a list of counts van Bergh, a lordship in Zutphen, Netherlands.

coat of arms

== House of Monte ==
- c. 1100-c. 1140: Constantinus de Monte
- c. 1140-c. 1190: Rabodo I
- c. 1190-c. 1220: Rabodo II
- c. 1220- 1260: Hendrik
- 1260-1290: Adam I
- 1290-1300: Frederik I
- 1300-1325: Adam II
- 1325-1340: Frederik II
- 1340-1360: Adam III
- 1360-1400: Willem I
- 1400-1416: Frederik III

== House of Van der Leck ==
- 1416-1441: Otto van der Leck
- 1441-1465: Willem II
- 1465-1506: Oswald I
- 1506-1511: Willem III
- 1511/24-546: Oswald II
- 1546-1586: Willem IV
- 1573-1638: Hendrik
- 1586-1611: Herman
- 1611-1656: Albert
- 1656-1712: Oswald III

== House of Hohenzollern-Bergh ==
- 1712-1737: Frans Willem
- 1737-1781: Johan Baptist, nicknamed "the Mad Count"
- 1781-1787: Johanna Josephina

== House of Hohenzollern-Sigmaringen ==
- 1769-1785: Karel Frederik
- 1785-1831: Anton Aloysius
- 1831-1848: Karel
- 1848-1885: Karel Anton
- 1885-1905: Leopold
- 1905-1913: Willem

Willem sold the Huis Bergh in 1913 to Jan Herman van Heek.

== See also ==
- Land van den Bergh
