= Huis Bergh =

Castle in 's-Heerenberg city, the Netherlands

- 's-Heerenberg, the Netherlands
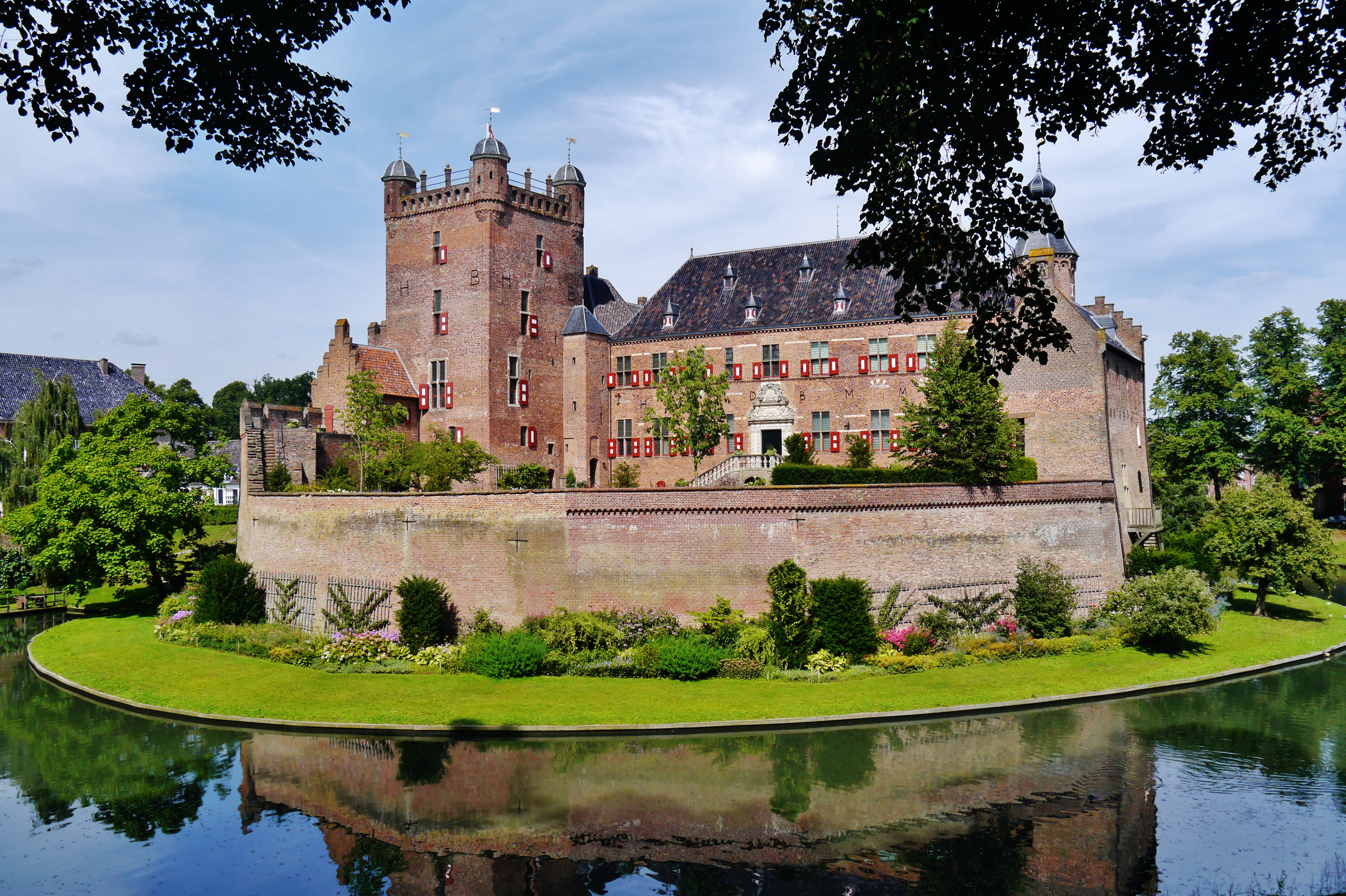
- Huis Bergh (2015)

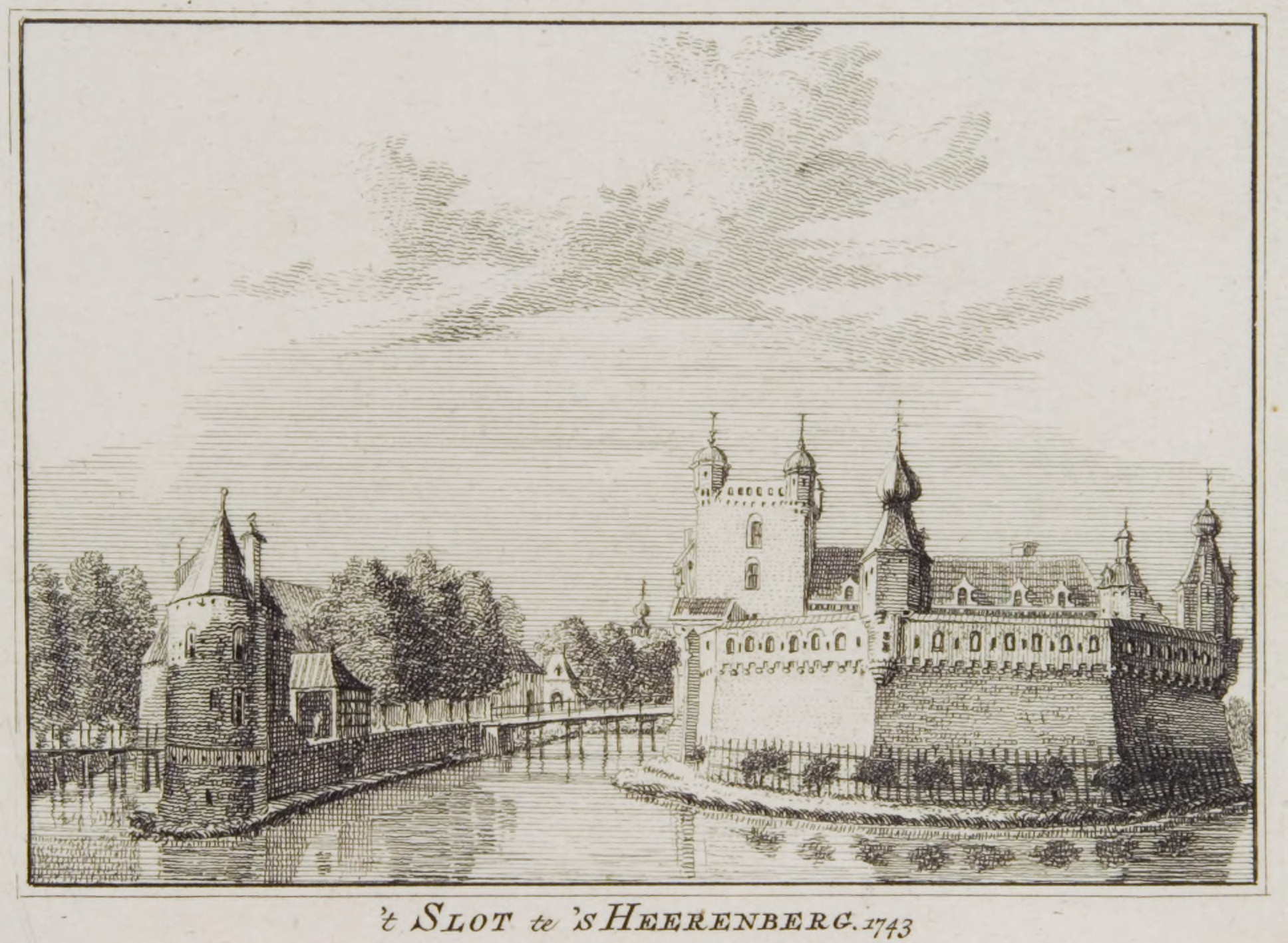
- Huis Bergh (1752)

Site information
- Type: Castle
- Condition: Good

Location
- The Netherlands
- Coordinates: 51°52′27″N 6°14′27″E

Site history
- Built: 1200
- Built by: Counts Van den Bergh
- Materials: Brick

Huis Bergh is a castle in 's-Heerenberg, in the Dutch province of Gelderland. It is one of the largest surviving castles in the Netherlands. It took its name from the Land van den Bergh and was built by the Counts Van den Bergh.

Nowadays, it is a popular tourist attraction for its beautiful appearance and late-medieval art collection.

== History ==
The castle’s building history dates back to the 13th century. The main parts of the castle are from the 14th, 15th and 17th century. The architecture got severely damaged during the Dutch Revolt, after Count Willem IV van den Bergh was dispossessed of the castle by the Duke of Alba. In 1735, the castle burned down.
In 1912 Huis Bergh and all belongings became the property of Jan Herman van Heek, an industrialist from Enschede.
He restored the buildings. In 1939 there was another major fire. Thanks to the help of locals most of the furniture was rescued. Renovation began the same year and was completed in 1941. Since the 1960s, the museum became incrementally accessible to the general public.

== Art collection ==
Huis Bergh holds a rich collection of paintings from the renaissance and early modern period. It is particularly known for its collection of early Italian paintings, which includes a panel from the Maestà of Duccio, as well as work by Bicci di Lorenzo, Bartolomeo Bulgarini, Niccolò di Segna, and Vittore Crivelli. These works were acquired during the 19th century. Former Rijksmuseum director Henk van Os played an important role in renewing the museum’s permanent display. Huis Bergh also preserves portraits of members of the Van den Bergh family, such as a likeness of Hendrik van den Bergh painted by Otto Vaenius c. 1618. Other important paintings include works by Lucas Cranach the Elder, the circles of Hieronymus Bosch, Lucas Gassel, and Quentin Matsys, and a group portrait of ’s-Heerenberg’s mintmaster Clemens van Eembrugge and his assistants (1581). In addition to its art collection, Huis Bergh has an extraordinary collection of medieval manuscripts and a uniquely well-preserved family archive with formal and informal documents relating to the history of the castle and its inhabitants.

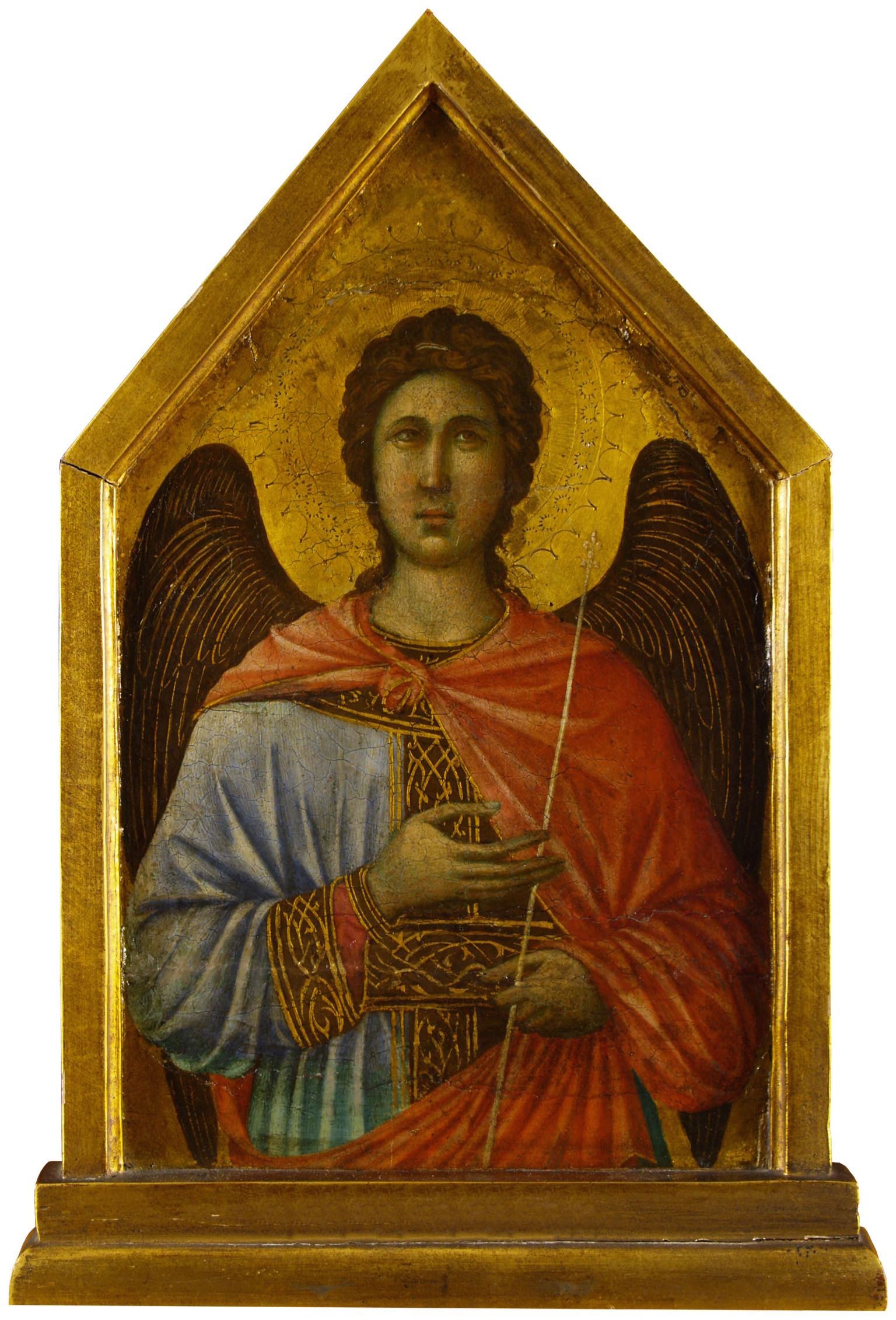
Archangel Gabriel by Duccio di Buoninsegna

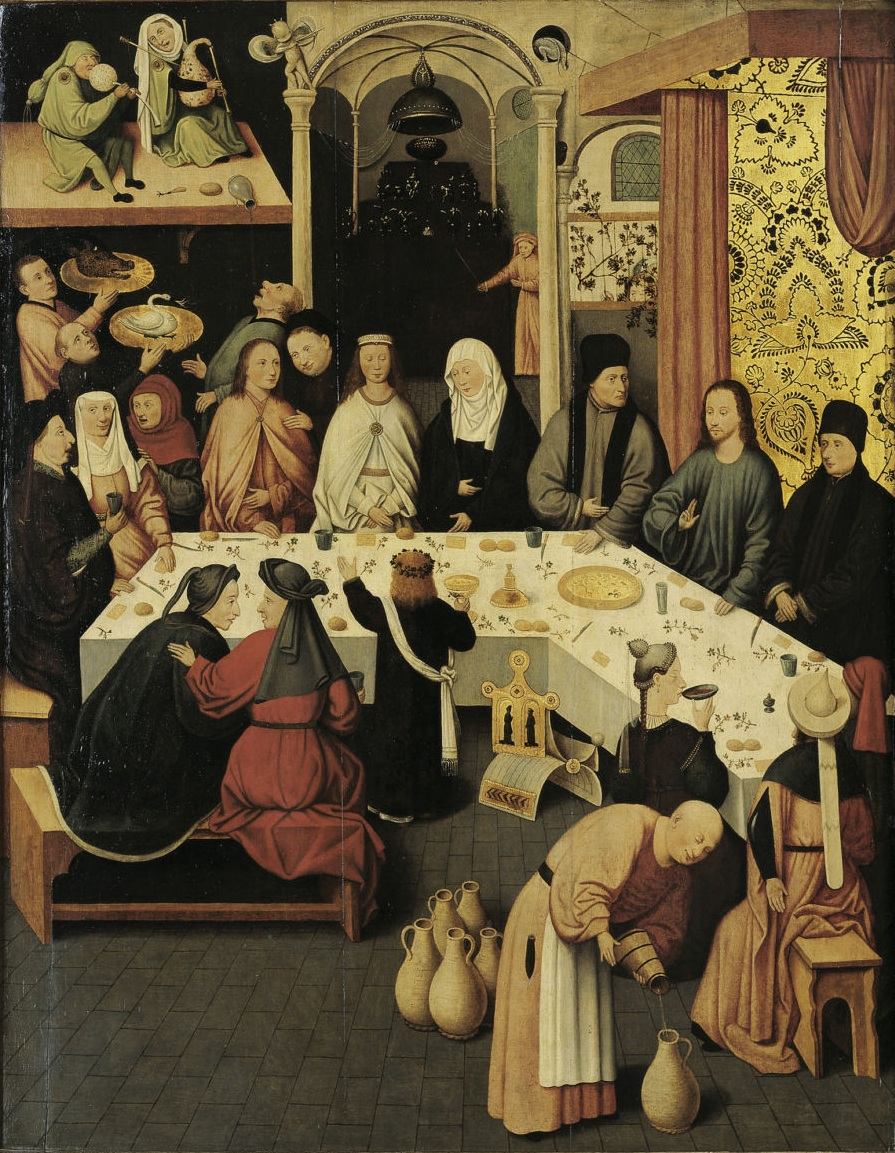
Wedding at Cana, circle of Hieronymus Bosch

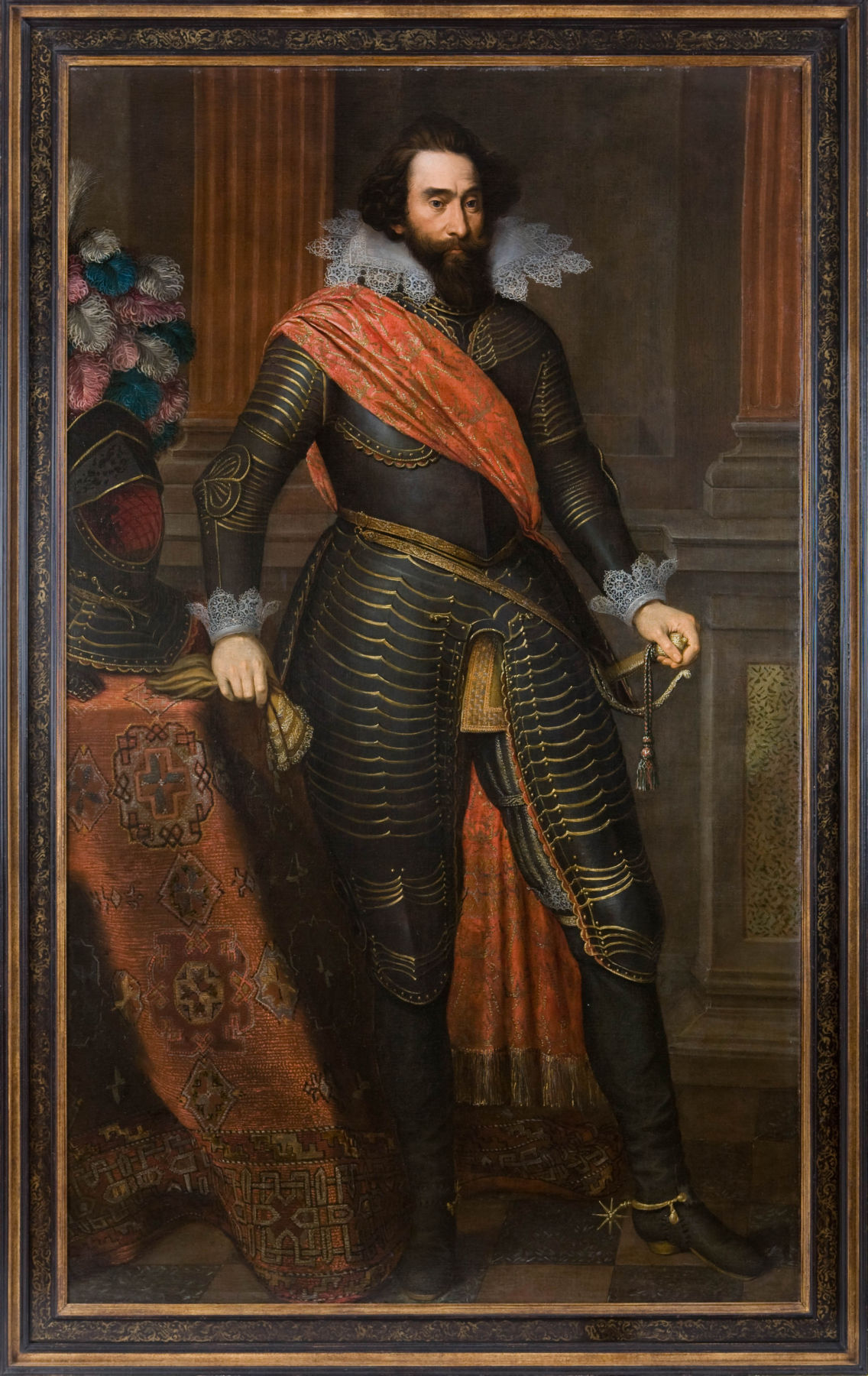
Portrait of Count Hendrik van den Bergh by Otto Vaenius

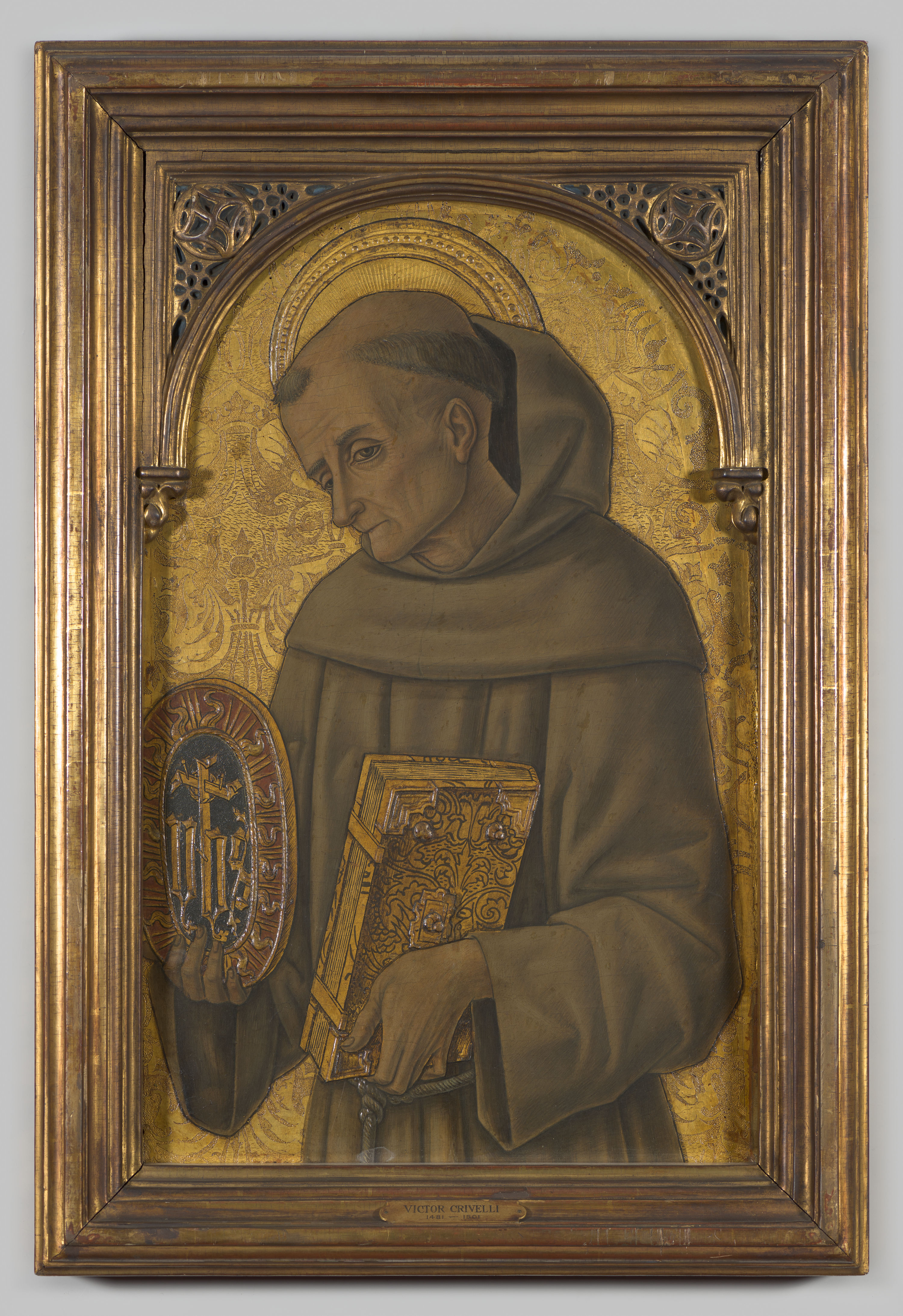
Bernardino of Siena by Vittore Crivelli

== Exterior ==
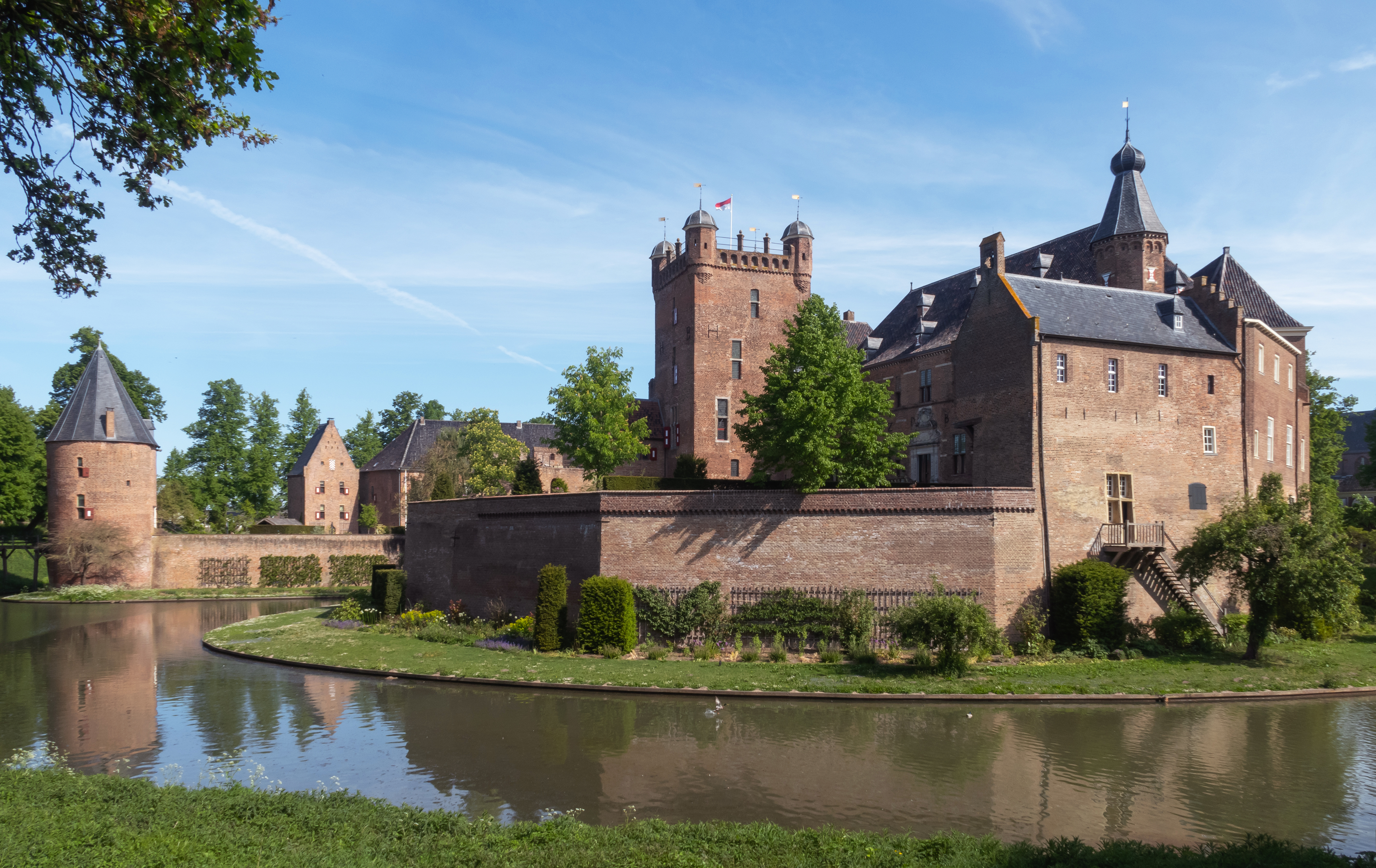
Castle: Huis Bergh

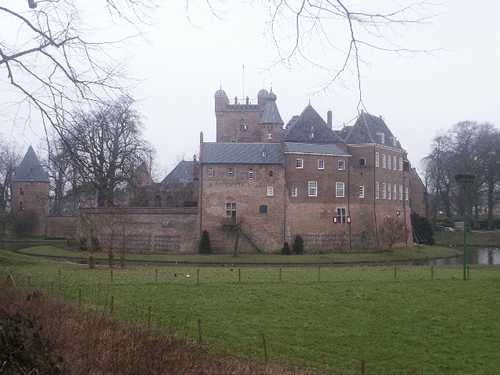
Huis Bergh

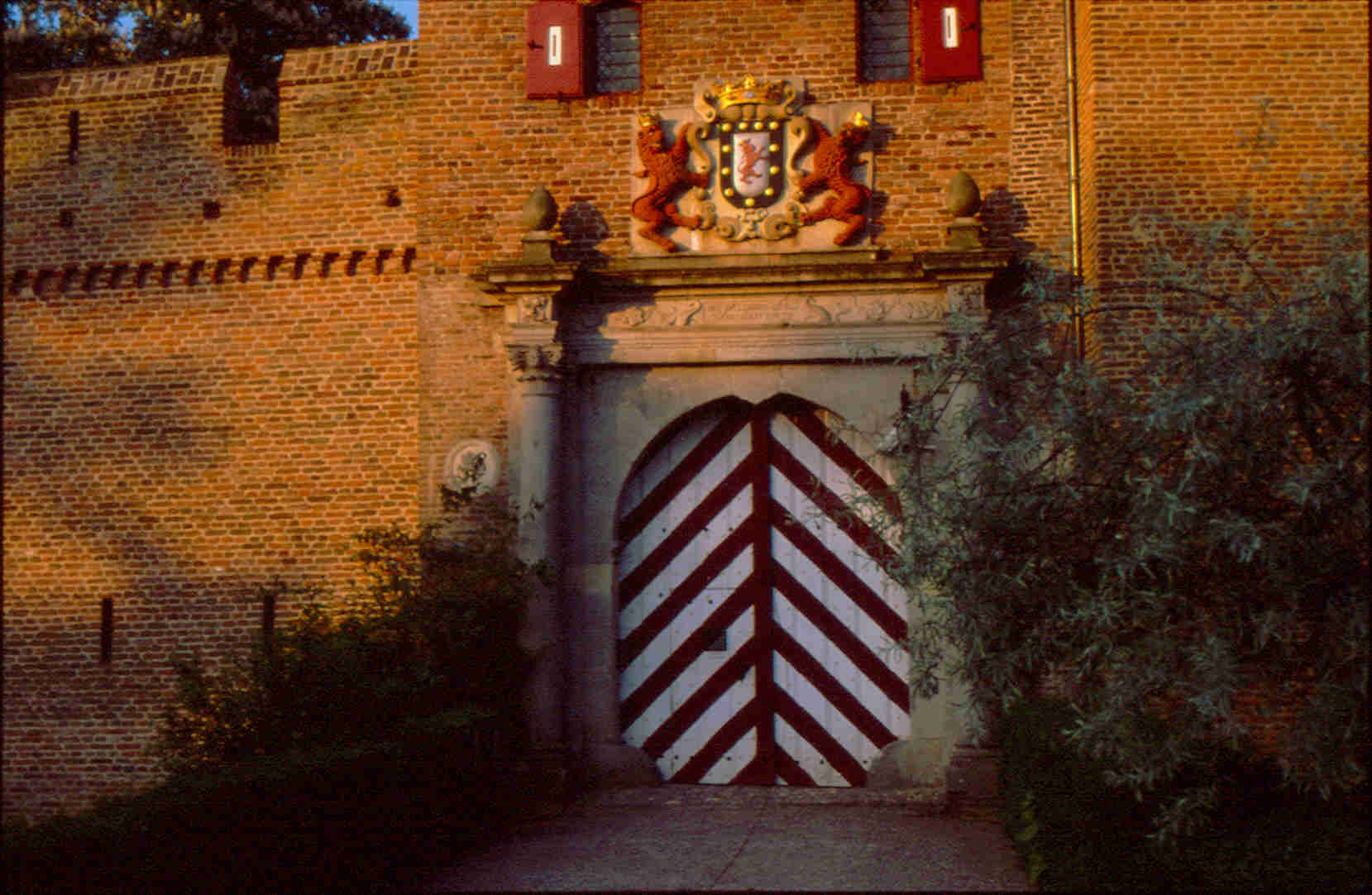
Entrance to Huis Bergh

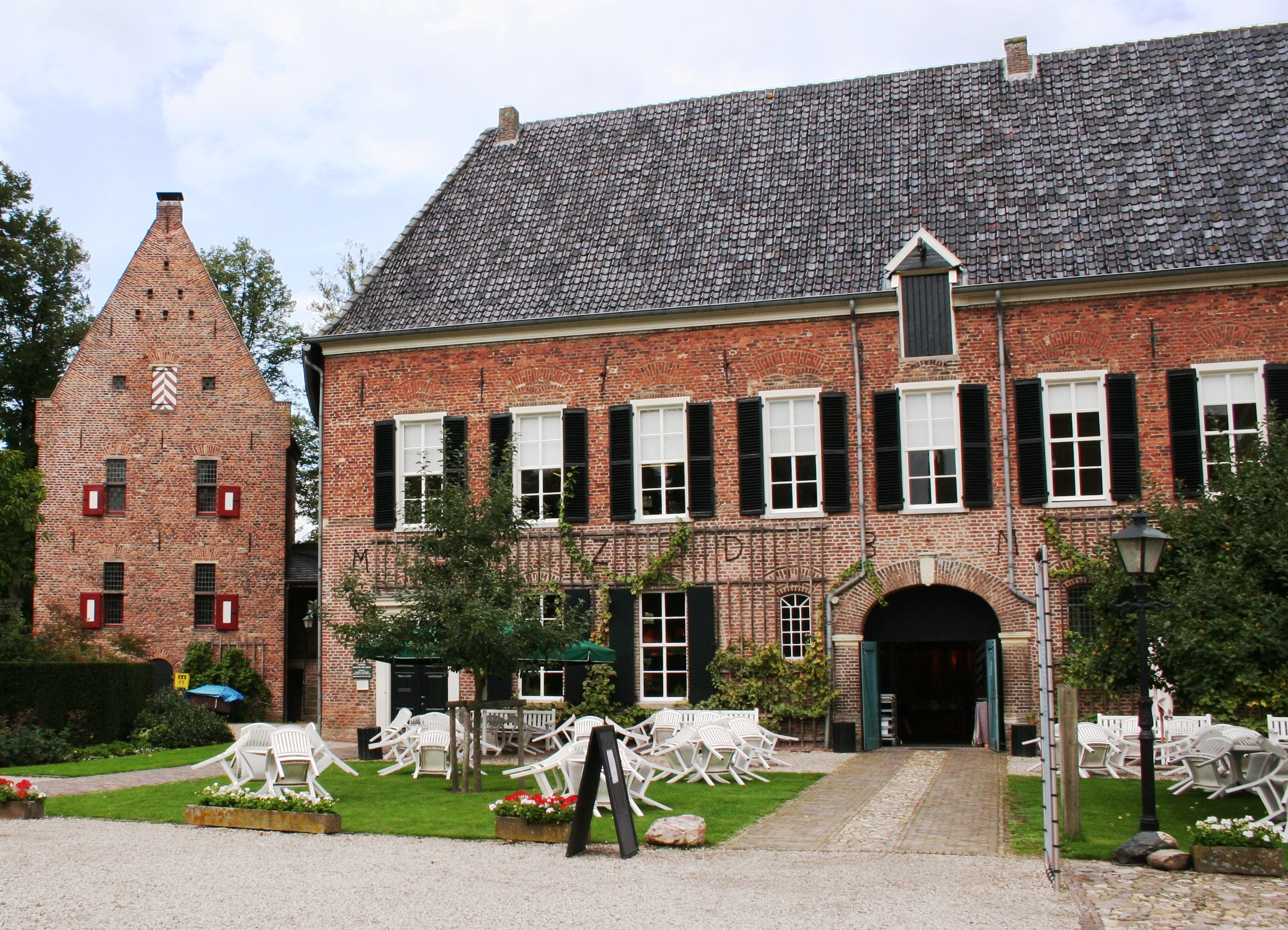
Restaurant at Huis Bergh

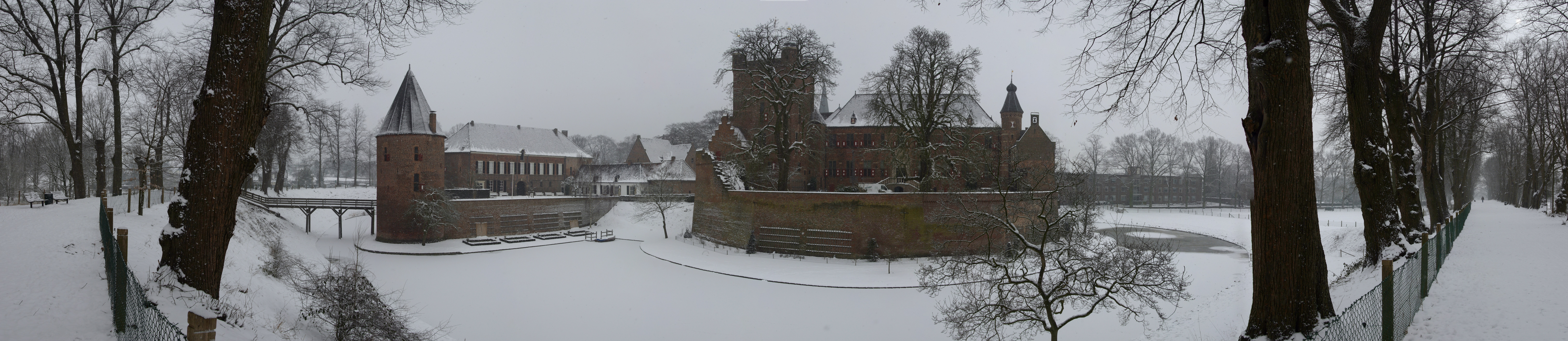
Huis Berg in the snow

== See also ==
- List of castles in the Netherlands
