= Anna Muggen =

Anna Jansdochter Muggen (d. 1608) was a Dutch woman and one of the last victims of the witch trials in the Netherlands.

== Biography ==
At the time of her prosecution in, Anna Muggen lived in Gorinchem, Holland. She was recently widowed, as her husband had died while fighting in the Eighty Years' War. Following his death, she began to behave erratically and exhibited depressive symptoms.

In May 1608, Muggen argued with a cobbler over his prices, uttering remarks that the cobbler interpreted as curses. The cobbler reported her for witchcraft, and she was arrested shortly afterwards on suspicion of making a pact with Satan.

Muggen freely confessed to all six charges raised against her, and voluntarily testified that the Devil gave her 200 guilders in return for each person she cursed. However, she also accused another local woman of conspiring with her. After Muggen was sentenced to death, local religious ministers successfully convinced the secular authorities to spare Muggen's alleged co-conspirator.

Following a speedy trial, Muggen was strangled to death, with her body burnt at the stake in Gorinchem's market square. She is sometimes erroneously referred to as the last Dutch person executed for witchcraft, though her case was followed by prosecutions including the 1610 Bredevoort witch trials.

== Legacy ==
=== In folklore ===
According to local legend, she used her last words to curse Gorinchem with eternal rain. Rain began to fall just as her pyre was set alight, causing bystanders to disperse. Local folklore also provides that Muggen haunts the market square where she died.

=== In music ===
The 2024 song "Anna's Woe" by Dutch metal band Officium Triste is based on Muggen's case.
