= Aagt Germonts =

17th-century Dutch woman accused of witchcraft

Aagt Germonts (also Abbekerk woman, Abbekerker-wijf) (c. 1621 – ?) was a Dutch woman who was accused of witchcraft.

Her father was Germont Jakobszoon, and her mother was Griet Dirix. In 1644, Aagt married a farmer, Claas Nijszoon, and they resided at De Weere in Abbekerk district.

She had three stillborn children, and when the foetuses were buried without anyone having seen them, she was suspected of witchcraft, or for having murdered them, and was prosecuted. When the graves of her dead children were exhumed by the court, the bodies were found to be dolls. She was sentenced to death for sorcery, but the death sentenced was commuted to pillorying, holding the three dolls in her hands.

The case against her attracted a lot of attention: witch trials were uncommon in the Netherlands, where no person had been executed for sorcery since Anna Muggen in 1608.

Her case was the subject of a treatise, Mis-geboorte of verhael van 't Abbekerker-wijf haare drie miskramen (1661). The contemporary jurists doubted her guilt and her case was taken as an example of the lack of belief in witchcraft.
