= Hetty van Gurp =

Canadian educator

Hetty (Hendrika) Margaretha van Gurp ONS (born 1949, in Delft) is a Canadian educator.

== Appointments ==
In 1995, Hetty was appointed to a two-year term as a member of the federal Human Rights Tribunal Panel. In 1996, she was awarded the YMCA Peace Medal. The Nova Scotia School Administrators' Association recognized her contribution to education by presenting her with the "Principal of Distinction" award in 1998. Also in 1998, Hetty was awarded a Baha'i Commendation for "Promoting Racial Harmony." In 1999, she received the Annual Crime Prevention Society of Nova Scotia Award. Hetty was awarded Queen Elizabeth II Golden Jubilee Medal in 2003. In July 2006, Hetty was presented with the Canadian Teachers' Federation Special Recognition Award for meritorious service to education in 2006. Hetty was named as a Canadian hero by Time magazine in June, 2006 and by Reader's Digest in January, 2007. Hetty was awarded the Order of Nova Scotia in 2013.

== Education ==
Hetty received her Bachelor of Education and Master of Education degrees from Mount Saint Vincent University in Halifax, Nova Scotia. In 2005, an honorary Doctor of Civil Law degree was bestowed on Hetty from Saint Mary's University in Halifax, based on her work as an educator, author, and community activist.
