= Neeltje Andries =

Dutch timber merchant

Neeltje Andries (1527-1603) was a wealthy Dutch timber merchant in Schiedam.

She married the wealthy timber merchant Maarten Paulusz. (d. 1593).

She was accused for witchcraft the first time in 1587. She was acquitted after an appeal. She was accused a second time in 1591. She questioned the charge and demanded her name be cleared by the high court. The high court allowed the charge to be made against her, but forbid any use of torture, which made it impossible to get a confession from her. Her husband died while she was imprisoned, and she managed to avoid the confiscation of his business, which she inherited. She was acquitted and cleared from all charges in 1593. After her release from prison, she took over her husband's successful timber trade.

The trial against her became an important precedence case in witch trials in The Netherlands, which made convictions of witchcraft more difficult in the future.
