= Entgen Luijten =

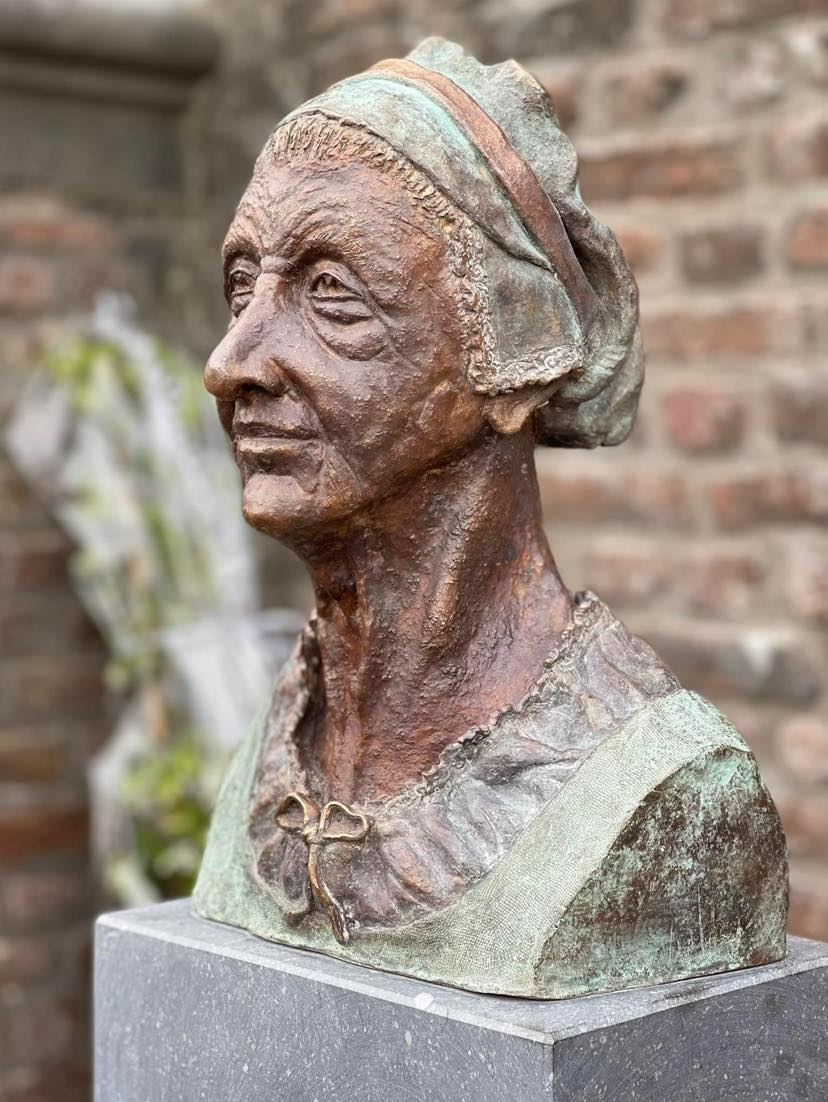
- Born: c. 1600; Limburg
- Died: October 9, 1674 (aged 74); Limbricht Castle
- Cause of death: Strangled to death (officially ruled suicide)
- Monuments: Statue at Limbricht Castle
- Criminal charges: Witchcraft

Entgen Luijten (also Luyten; c. 1600 – 9 October 1674) was a Dutch woman who was accused of witchcraft and died in custody. Though she was not officially sentenced, she is widely considered to be the last victim of the witch trials in the Netherlands.

== Biography ==
=== Life ===
Luijten, who was born in Limburg, was an elderly widow living alone at her home in Lutterade when she first faced accusations of witchcraft. She practised herbal medicine and gave traditional remedies to neighbours.

In the summer of 1673, a local farmer accused her of cursing and killing three of his cows. Luijten sued him for defamation for the sum of 500 guilders, though ultimately discounted her suit; locals subsequently began to spread rumours of her guilt.

=== Accusations of witchcraft ===
On 21 July 1674, Luijten was arrested on suspicion of witchcraft and interrogated by prosecutor Herman Tacken. She was imprisoned in the cellars of Limbricht Castle while a case was built against her. Luijten was around 74 years old at the time, and her health quickly began to deteriorate in the damp conditions of her cell, though she denied the charges against her.

An indictment issued on 4 August 1674 accused Luijten of murdering a man named Gorten van Neusz around 26 years before her arrest, by enchanting the mug of beer he drank from. She was also supposedly responsible for causing the death of a young girl named Aleth 16 years prior through supernatural means. Other allegations included killing the livestock of local farms.

=== Death ===
Luijten was interrogated for a final time on 3 October by lawyer Nicolaus Helgers. She was found dead in her cell six days later. Though the coroner recorded that Luijten had been strangled to death, the authorities officially ruled that she had died by suicide. Some historians, and descendants of Luijten living in the 21st century, consider it likely that Luijten was murdered by an unknown assailant.

Although Luijten had not been found guilty of any crime, nor the allegations against her, she did not receive a traditional burial. Her body was buried near the gallows in Einighausen within Sittard-Geleen.

== Legacy ==
=== Statue at Limbricht Castle ===
In the 21st century, visual artist Ankie Vrolings worked with Luijten's living descendants to create a bronze sculpture of Luijten in her honour. Vrolings' project brought together branches of Luijten's family line that had never met each other. As no contemporary depictions of Luijten are extant, Vrolings studied historic portraits of the family to estimate what Luijten may have looked like.

The statue was installed at Limbricht Castle on 3 June 2022. Descendants of Luijten from various families attended the unveiling ceremony.

=== In media ===
The 2021 novel, De heks van Limbricht ("The Limbricht Witch") by Susan Smit, is a partially fictionalized portrayal of Luijten's life. Producer Pieter Kuijpers purchased the film rights to Smit's book in October 2021.

Luijten's case is also depicted in the 2022 short film De Beul van Entgen Luyten ("The Executioner of Entgen Luyten").
