= Hendrika Hofhuis =

Dutch accused witch

Hendrika Hofhuis (1780–1849), was a Dutch woman, famous for being put on trial for witchcraft in 1823. While this was not a real witch trial, she was the last person to be formally charged with such a crime in the Netherlands.

== Life ==
Hofhuis was born to a farmer and married to a farmer in Deldenerbroek.

In 1823, she contacted the authorities and demanded to be tried by water for witchcraft, in order to clear her name for the rumours of sorcery that were circulating about her. She had been turned away from a sick child's bed because she was said to be responsible. The rumours had increased to such a degree that her own children suspected her.

The Dutch authorities did no longer believe in witchcraft. However, while witch trials, at this point, had not been conducted in the Netherlands for over a century, the law which made witchcraft illegal had never been abolished, and thus made it possible to conduct such an investigation. Hofhuis demanded to be charged so that she may be able to clear her name in the eyes of her neighbours, thus ending the slander against her. The authorities agreed to her request to assist her. While not actually a witch trial, as the authorities merely allowed her this to end the harassment from her neighbors, it can nevertheless be regarded as the last event resembling a formal witch trial in the Netherlands.

The ordeal by water was by tradition able to clear a person suspected of sorcery by a demonstration that she could not float on water. The authorities approved her demand and referred to the fact that the accused had initiated to be tried by ordeal for witchcraft on her own accord. She invited the whole village to witness the ordeal. During the ordeal, she sunk below the water, and thereby cleared herself from all suspicions.

The case attracted great attention in contemporary European press and literature.
