= 's-Heerenberg =

City in Gelderland, the Netherlands

- City
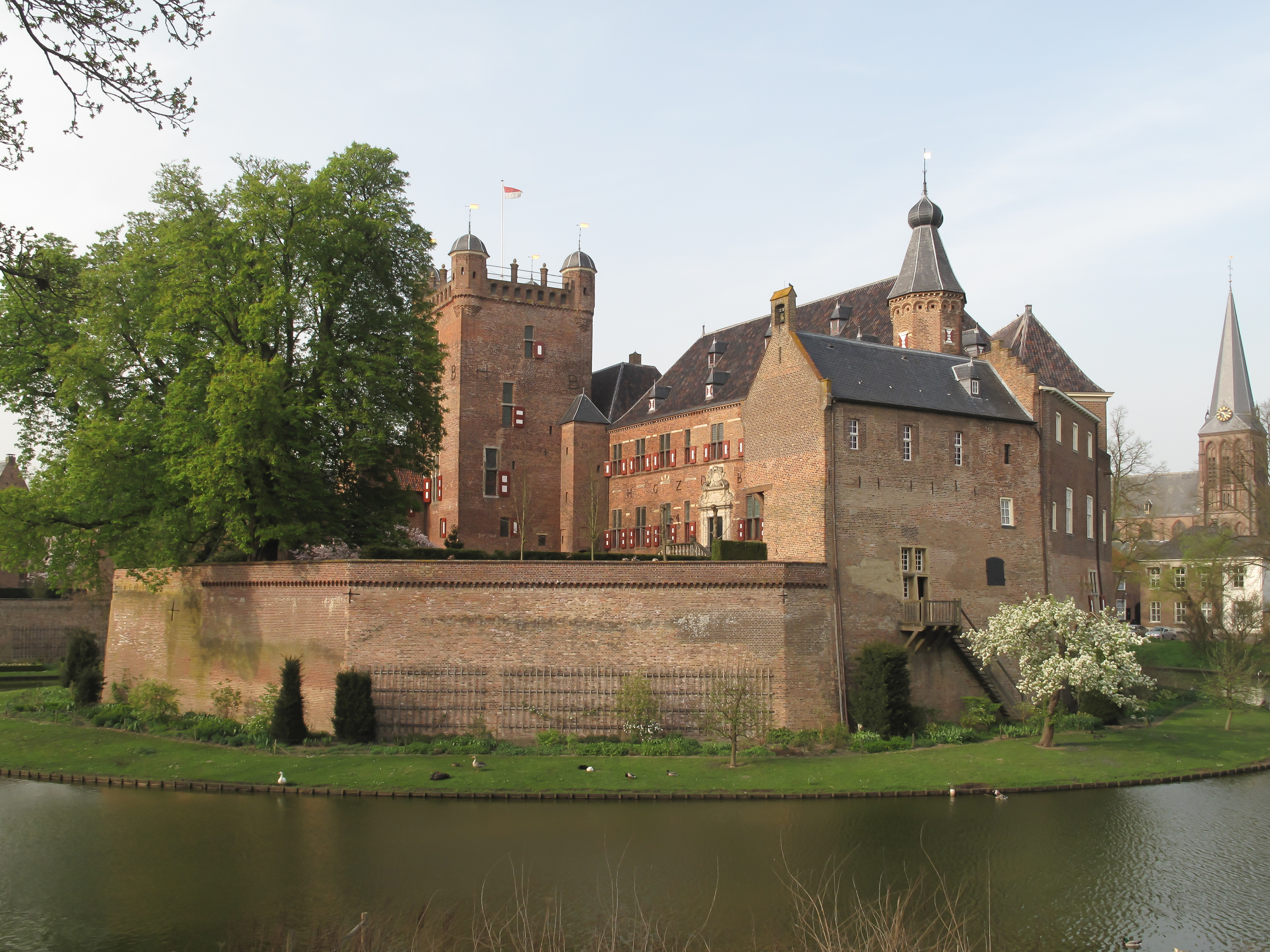
- 's Heerenberg castle.

- Location within the Netherlands 's-Heerenberg (Netherlands)
- Coordinates: 51°52′35″N 6°14′45″E
- Country: Netherlands
- Province: Gelderland
- Municipality: Montferland

Area
  - Total: 3.40 km^{2} (1.31 sq mi)
- Elevation: 17 m (56 ft)

Population (2021)
  - Total: 8,635
- Time zone: UTC+1 (CET)
  - Summer (DST): UTC+2 (CEST)
- Postal code: 7041
- Dialing code: 0314

's-Heerenberg is a city on the Dutch-German border, in the Province of Gelderland, Netherlands. It is located about 5 km north of the German Emmerich, and about 12 kilometres (7.5 mi) south of Doetinchem. It received city rights in 1379.

's-Heerenberg is the location of one of the most important castles of the Netherlands: Huis Bergh. The Huis Bergh contains a panel of the Archangel Gabriel from the famous altar piece Maestà by Duccio. The castle is surrounded to the west by a forest, part of the larger nature reserve Bergherbos.

Mechteld ten Ham was accused of sorcery. She demanded a trial, and failed the water test, because she remained floating on the water. During torture, she confessed to being a witch, and was burnt at the stake on 25 July 1605. In 2004, a statue was revealed in her honour. In 2015, her statue was set on fire.

Until 1821 's-Heerenberg was a separate municipality; it then became the administrative center of Bergh. Since 2005 it is part of the municipality of Montferland. The border canal 'Grenskanaal' constitutes the border to Germany. Industrial parks 't Goor and the Immenhorst are situated near this border.

The annual Montferland Run road running competition is held in 's-Heerenberg every December. The race has been previously won by world-class runners like Haile Gebrselassie, Kenenisa Bekele, Lornah Kiplagat and Paula Radcliffe.

== Gallery ==
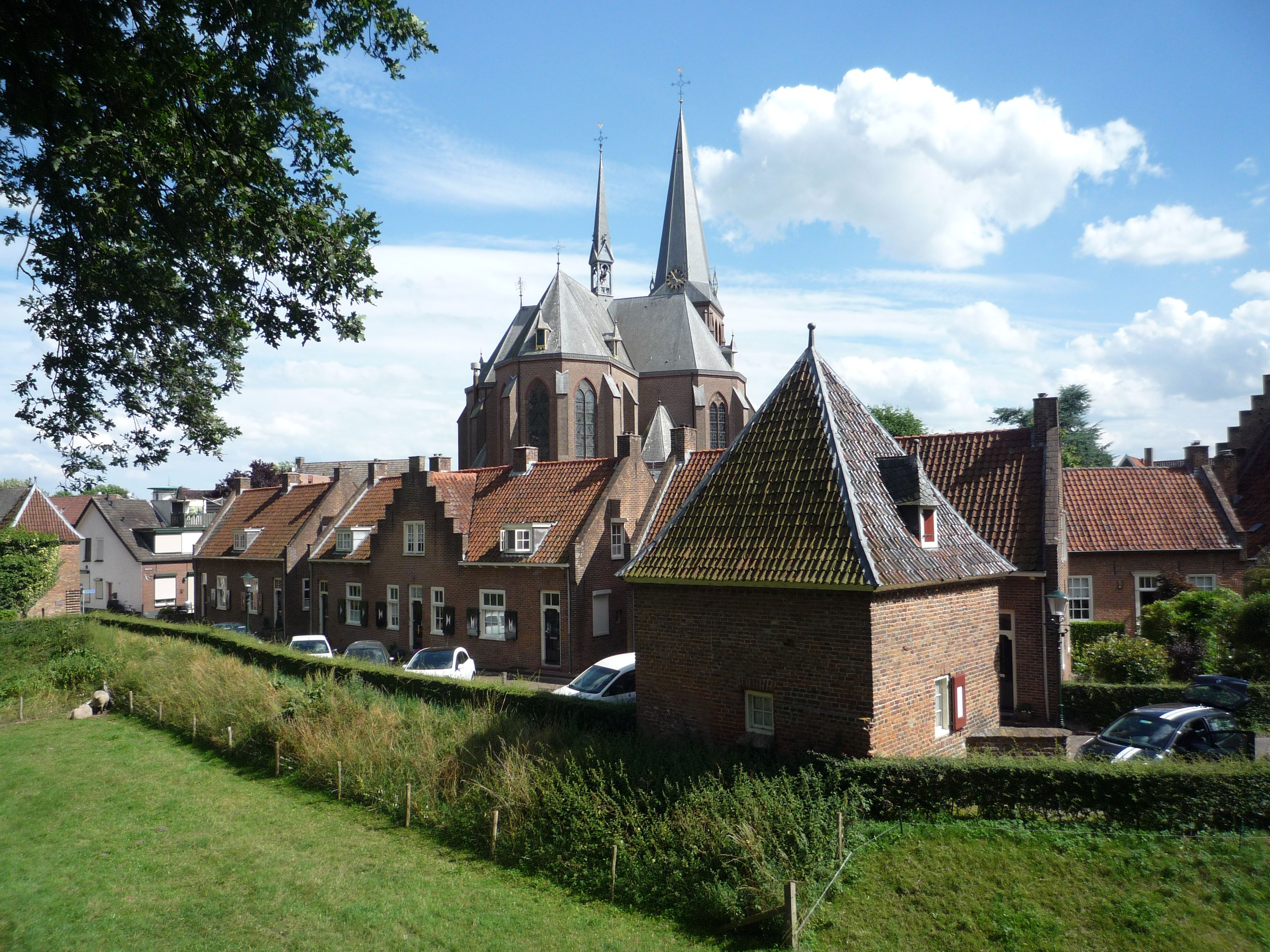
's-Heerenberg

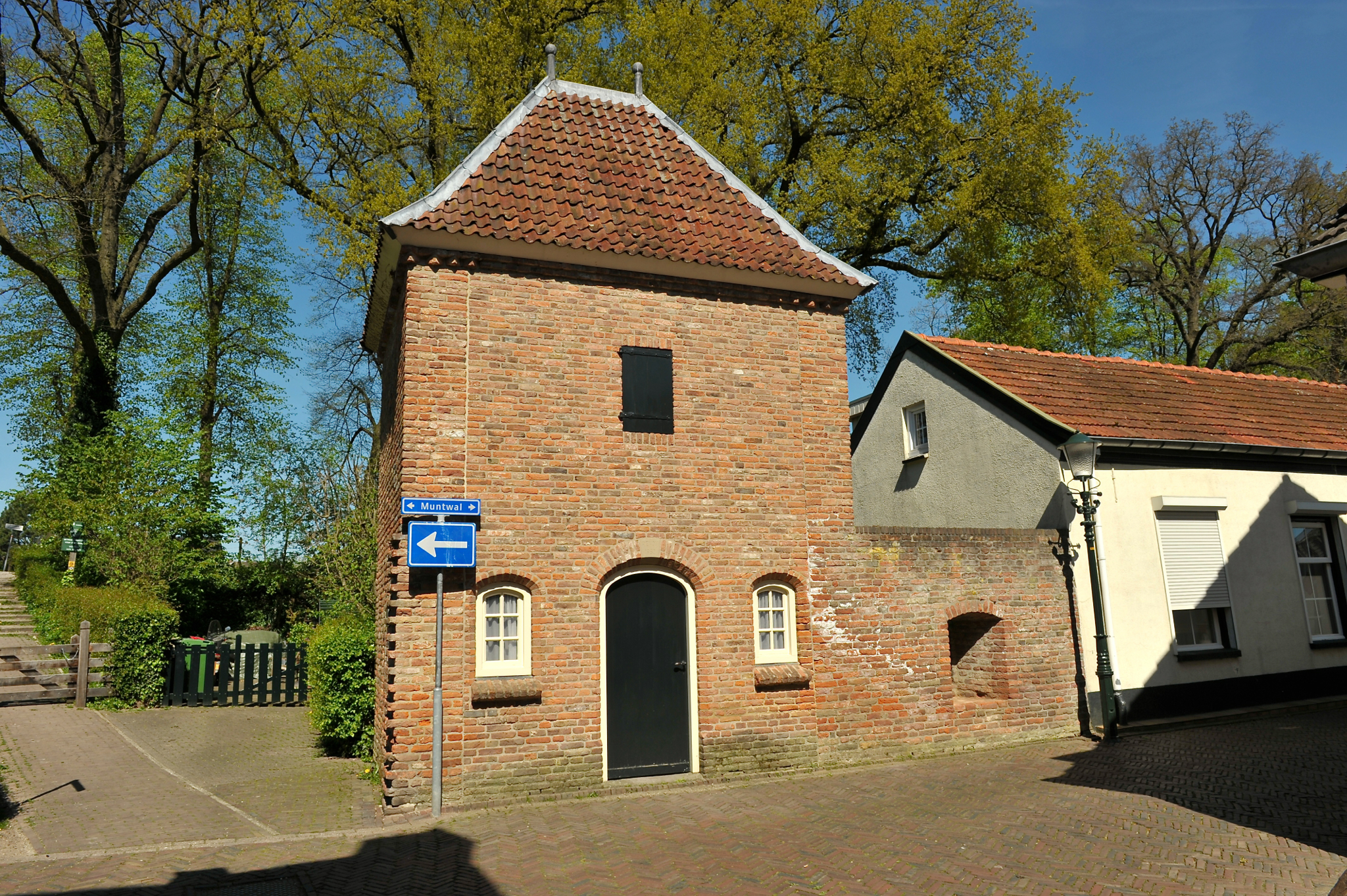
City wall

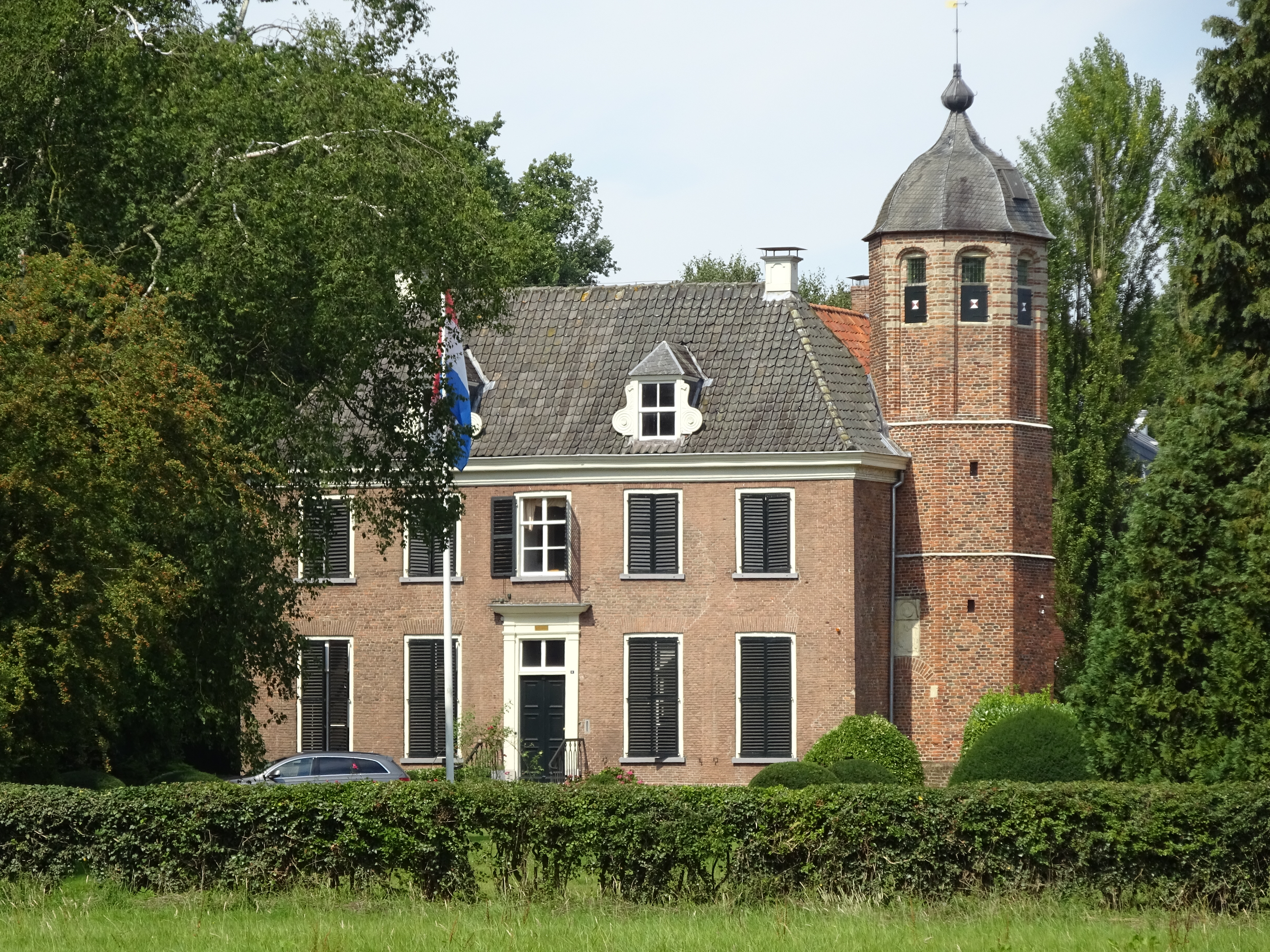
Boetselaersborg

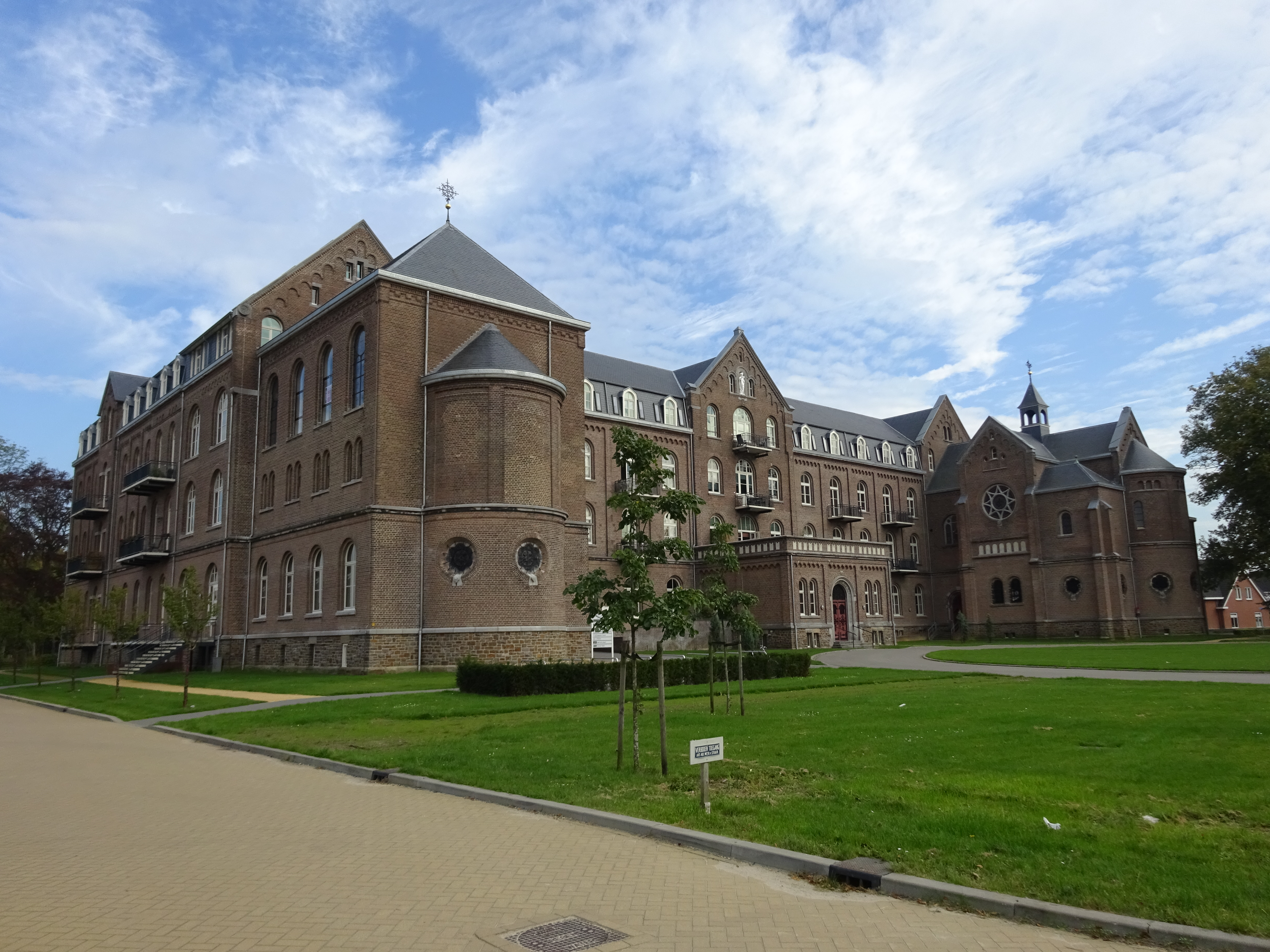
Former monastery Don Rua

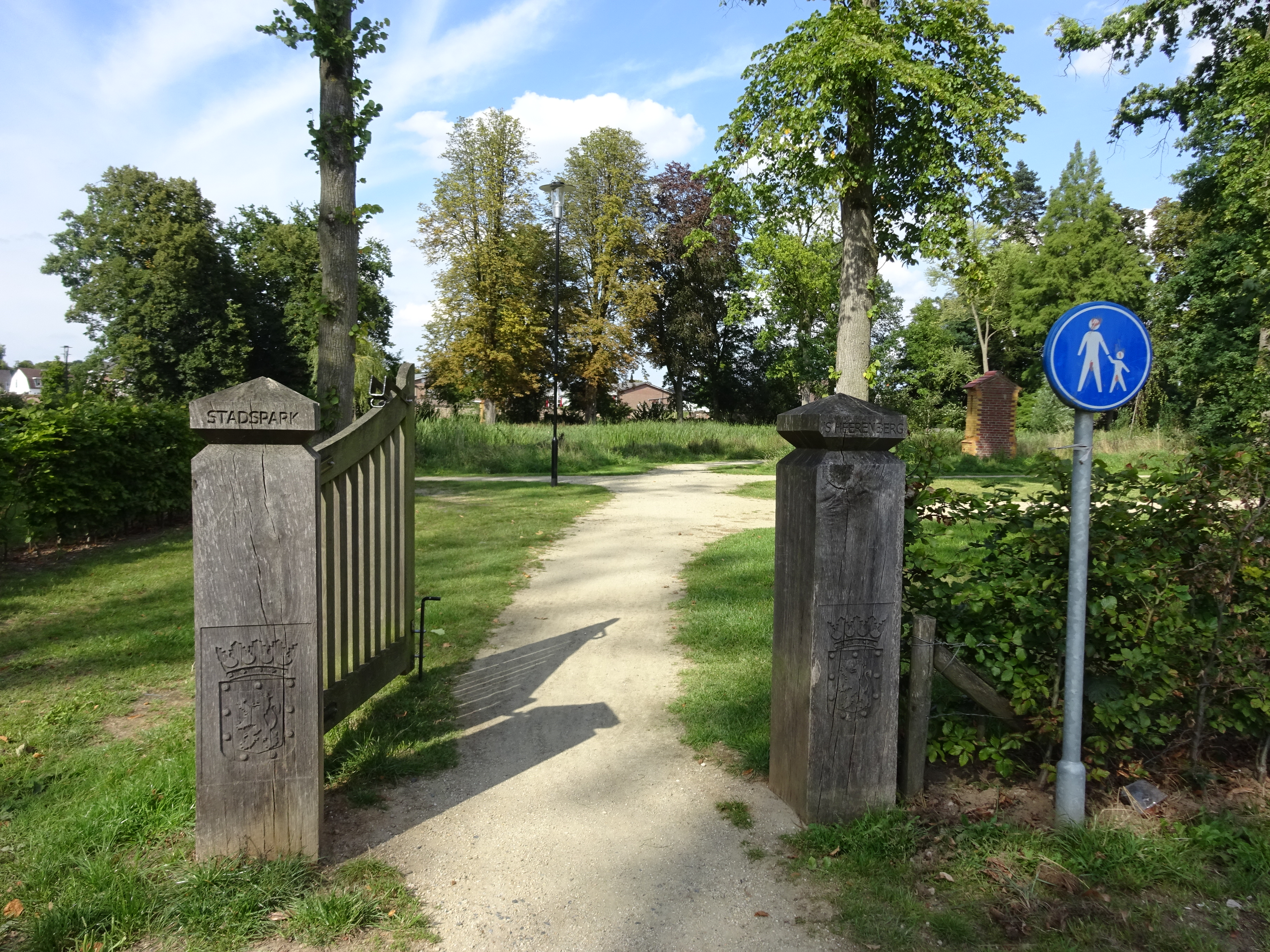
City parc at the monastery

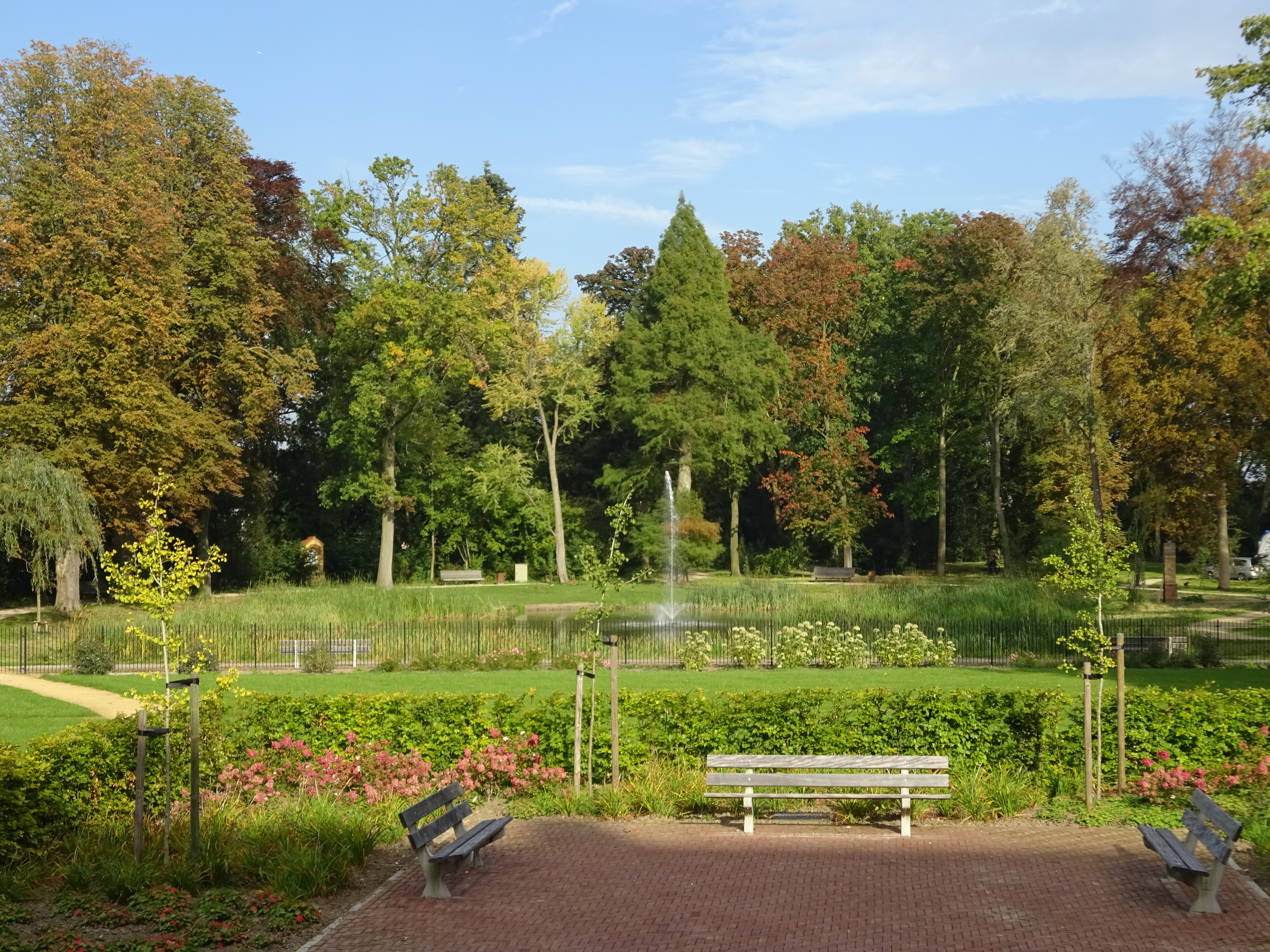
City parc at the monastery

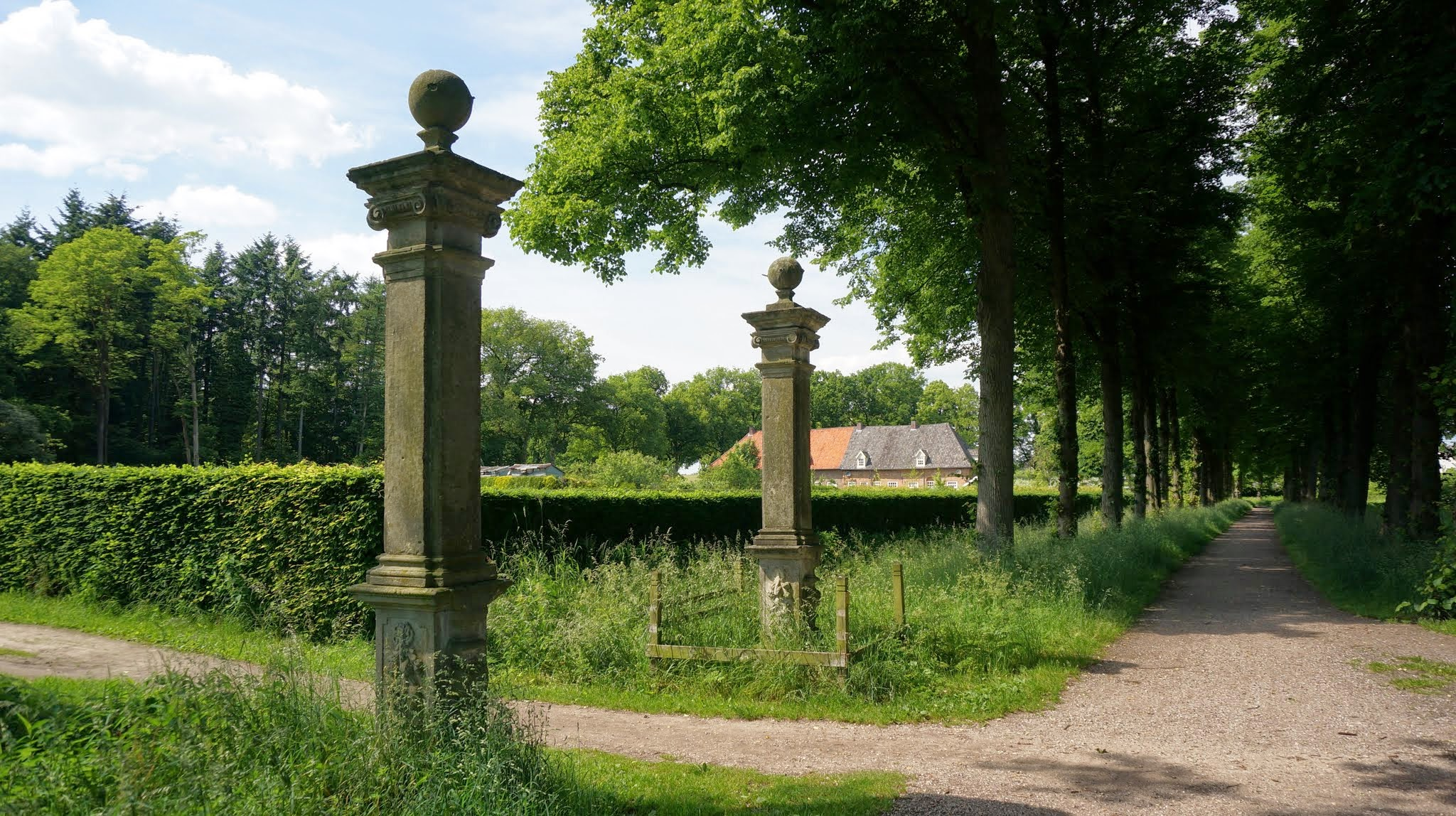
Parcs of Huis Bergh

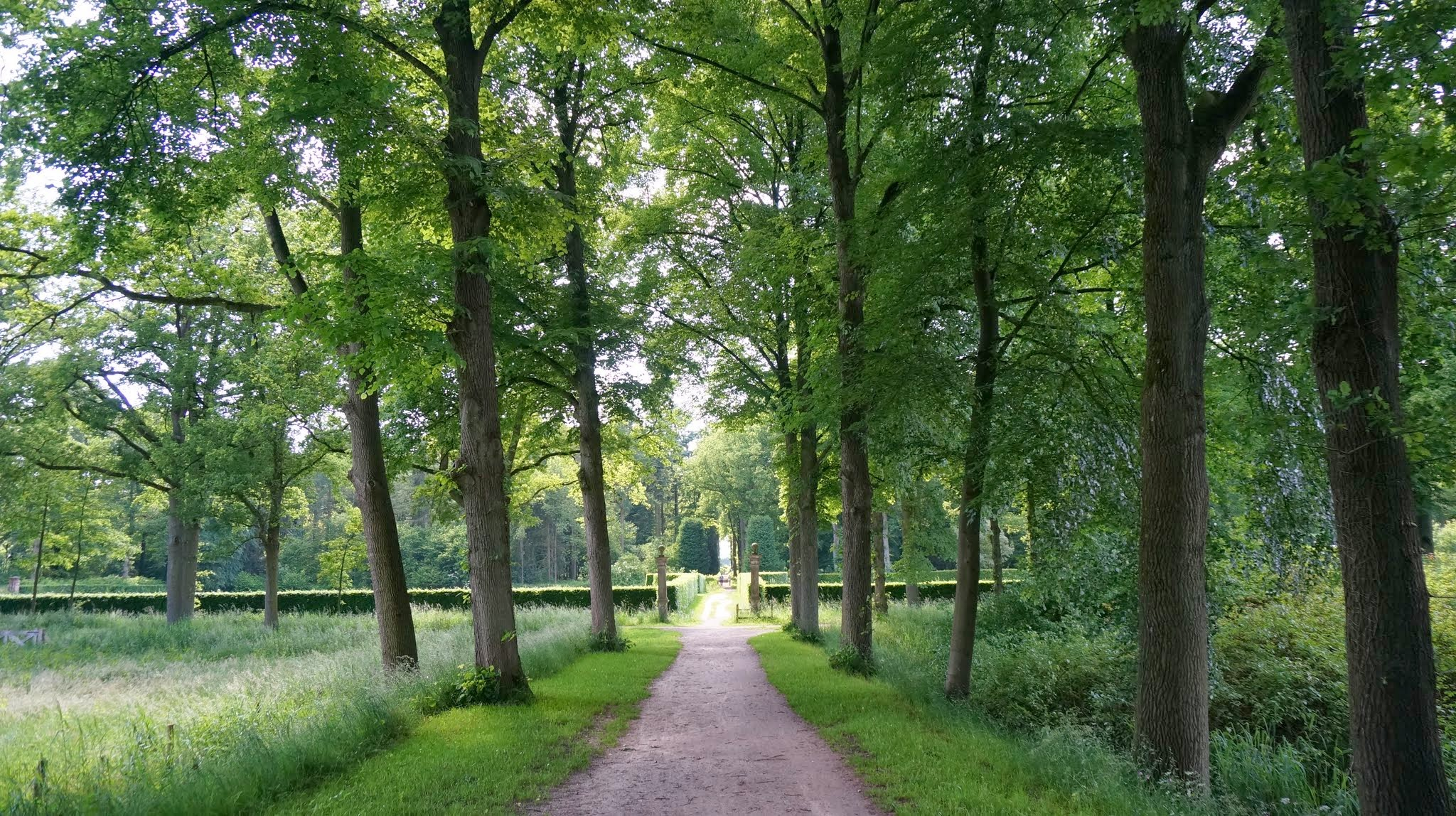
Bergherbos
