= Witch trials in the Spanish Netherlands =

The Witch trials in the Spanish Netherlands (present-day Belgium and Luxembourg minus the Prince-Bishopric of Liège, the Duchy of Bouillon and the Princely Abbey of Stavelot-Malmedy) were among the more intense witch-hunts, along with those of the Holy Roman Empire and France. In this, it was similar to the Witch trials in Latvia and Estonia.

The Spanish Netherlands is still regarded as a region with a tremendously large number of organised witch hunts. At the same time, emphasis is placed on the total contrast between the Southern Netherlands on the one hand, and the Dutch Republic or the Northern Netherlands (now the Kingdom of the Netherlands) on the other, with witchcraft prosecution being comparatively rare in the North. Archival evidence and the number of people executed as witches at first sight seem to support this contrast. The current state of historical research shows that between 1450 and 1685 at least 1,150 to 1,250 individuals were executed as witches in the South – a number that is a great deal higher than the 160 to 200 persons put to death as witches in the Northern Netherlands between 1450 and 1608. However, within the Southern Netherlands, a clear distinction should be made between prosecutions in Dutch-speaking and in French- and German-speaking areas.

== Background ==
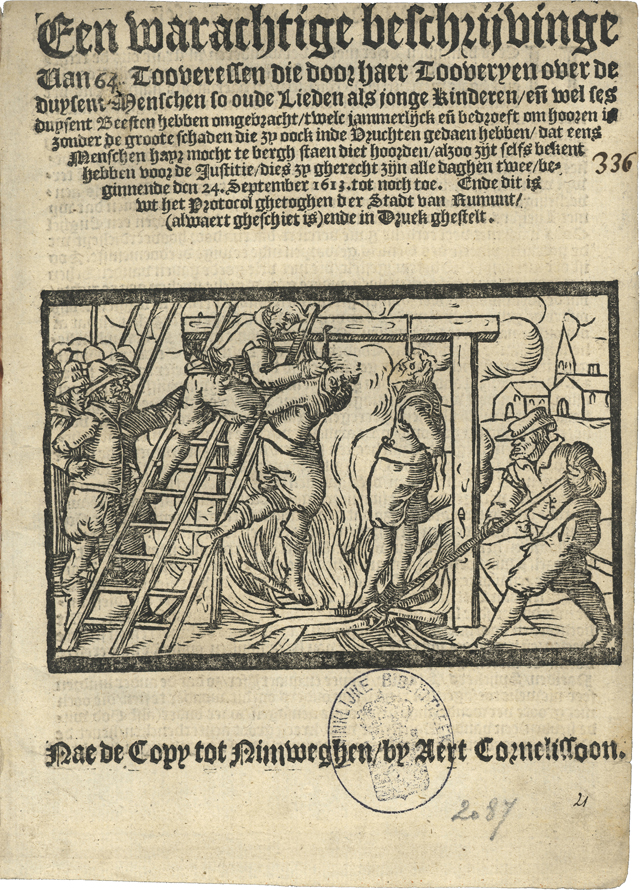
Witch burning in Roermond in 1613 (depicted in Een warachtige beschrijvinge van 64 tooveressen|Een warachtige beschrijvinge van 64 tooveressen)

The province of Groningen's first trials were in 1457, leading to the executions of twenty women and a man. In the 1550s the area between Rhine and Meuse was hit hard, while in the 1560s, and particularly in 1564, prosecutions peaked in the County of Holland.

After the Dutch War of Independence, the Low Countries were divided. The Northern Netherlands became a Protestant republic, while the Southern Netherlands remained under Catholic Habsburg Spain. In the Northern Netherlands witch trials were rare but peaked earlier than in the Southern Netherlands. Despite significant losses of archival material, it seems that the Northern Netherlands saw most of their trials for sorcery and witchcraft between 1550 and 1575, when prosecutions in the Southern Netherlands were only just beginning.

== History ==
=== French- and German-speaking areas - south of the language border ===
Namur, Luxembourg, Walloon Flanders, Artois and Cambrai experienced a first serious wave of witch trials already in the first half of the 16th century. The persecutions were also much more intense: although the region is mostly rural and therefore far less populous, the number of executed witches makes up for 75% of the total number of executions of the Southern Netherlands. The figures are particularly high for Namur and Luxembourg.

The proximity to the Trier witch trials, where between 1581 and 1591 around 350 people were executed, the influence of the demonological treatises of Peter Binsfeld, and local experts in witch-finding (Hexenausschüsse or Monopoles) who trawled the villages looking for every possible rumour concerning witchcraft, all certainly played a decisive role in these high figures. The number of executions in the French-speaking part is estimated at minimum 478 and maximum 578 people, in the German -speaking part - Duchy of Luxembourg - 358 people, bringing the total of this area to 836 to 936.

=== Dutch-speaking areas - north of the language border ===
Only around 1589 witch trials really broke through the language boundary, with initial peaks to 1612 (Brabant) and 1628 (Flanders), a ‘revival’ around 1630/45 and – at least for Flanders – the final executions after 1650.

The total number of executions is 314, while the population was considerably higher compared to the French- and German speaking area's. In the merchant city of Antwerp only one woman was burned at the stake in 1603, a remarkably low number for such an important and populous city. The essential difference between the Dutch-speaking regions of the Southern Netherlands and the Northern Netherlands lays more in the chronology than in the intensity of witchcraft prosecutions.

=== The end ===
The Witch trials in the Spanish Netherlands gradually became fewer after the 1630s. In 1684, Martha van Wetteren became the last person to be executed for sorcery in Flanders, and after 1692 no more witch trials were held.

== Gender ==
The proportion of women executed as witches in the Southern Netherlands is entirely comparable to those for early modern Europe as a whole with an average is 80% women. In the County of Flanders that was the exact proportion (162 of the 202 executed). In the Dutch-speaking parts of Brabant however 94% of those put to death were women. In Hainaut only women were executed and in Namur 92% of executed were women.

But Luxembourg (75%), Cambrai and Artois (64%) paint a somewhat different picture, although this may also be due to a lack of archival sources.

== See also ==
- Witch trials in the early modern period
- Werewolf witch trials
