= Bredevoort witch trials =

The Bredevoort witch trials took place in Bredevoort in The Netherlands in 1610.

The witch trials of 1610 started when Jenneken ter Honck of Dinxperlo was prosecuted, accused of having caused disease to livestock by the use of sorcery. She was tortured and named Gertken op 't Goir as her accomplice. More accomplices were then mentioned as she was tortured further, expanding the witch trial. More people, both men and women, were prosecuted, subjected to ordeal by water, and tortured to confess and name accomplices, who were then also arrested. Ten men and women were executed by burning for witchcraft in Bredevoort in 1610. The Bredevoort witch trials was the perhaps last witch trial conducted by The Dutch Republic resulting in death sentences.
