= Jan Herman van Heek =

Dutch businessman

Jan Herman van Heek (Enschede, 20 October 1873 – Doetinchem, 25 January 1957) was a Dutch industrialist, textile manufacturer, patron of the arts, art collector and nature conservationist and owner of Huis Bergh.
