= Loil =

- Village
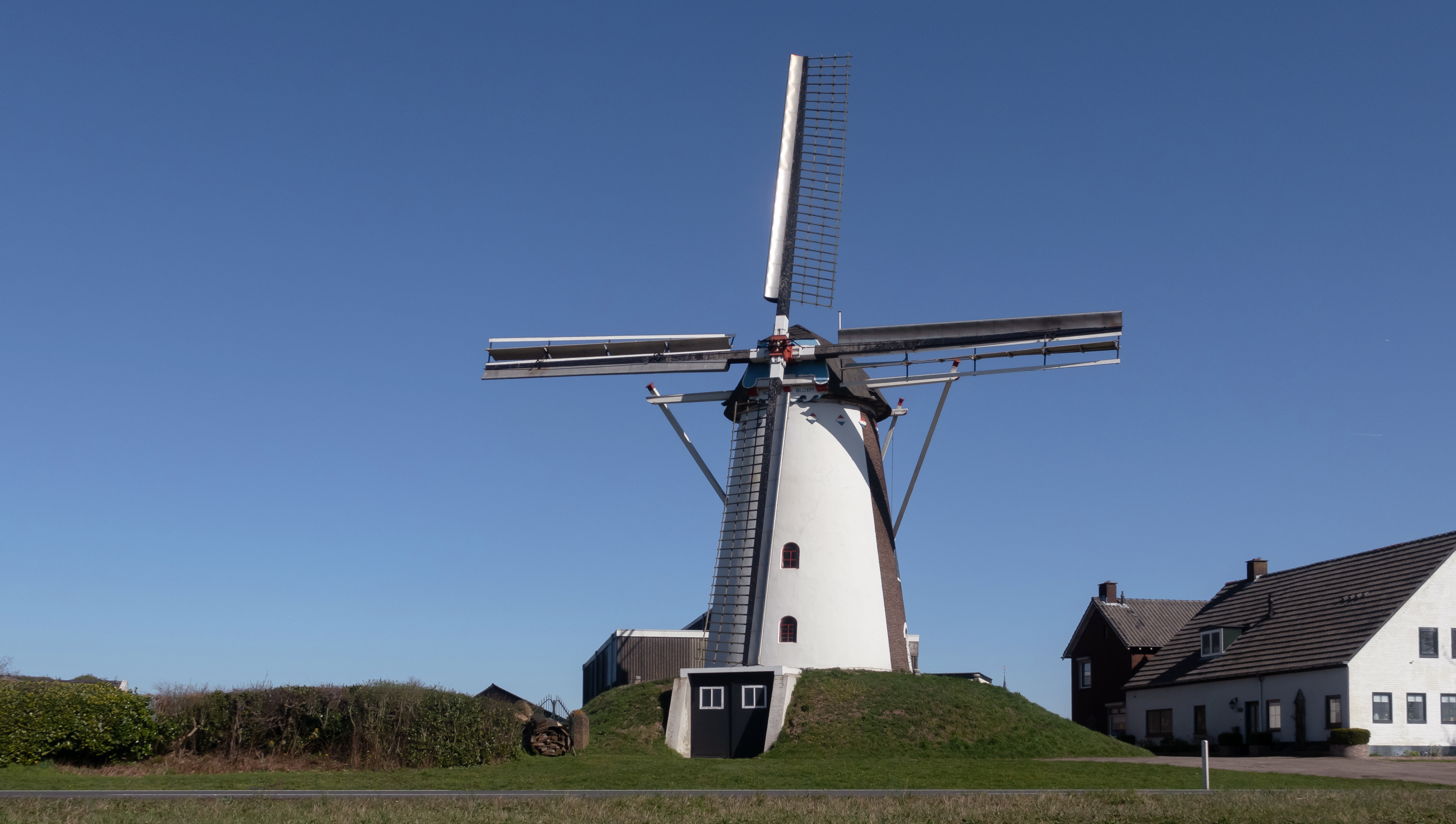
- Wind mill De Korenbloem

- Flag Coat of arms

- Location in the Netherlands Loil (Netherlands)
- Coordinates: 51.95158°N 6.14043°E
- Country: Netherlands
- Province: Gelderland
- Municipality: Montferland

Area
  - Total: 8.19 km^{2} (3.16 sq mi)
- Elevation: 12 m (39 ft)

Population (2021)
  - Total: 1,560
  - Density: 190/km^{2} (493/sq mi)
- Time zone: UTC+1 (CET)
  - Summer (DST): UTC+2 (CEST)
- Postal code: 6941
- Dialing code: 0316

Loil (Dutch pronunciation: [loːl]) is a village in the Dutch province of Gelderland. It is a part of the municipality of Montferland. Loil forms a single urban area with Didam and is often referred to as a neighbourhood, but it is an independent village.

== History ==
It was first mentioned around 1200 as Loel, and means "little open forest". Even though it is spelt Loil, the pronunciation is Lool. ’t Hof Loil was a manor house which was first mentioned in 1390; though, the building was older than the castle. A fire destroyed the manor house in 2014.

The village of Loil developed around the manor house. Built around 1300, Loil Castle belonged to the Duchy of Cleves. In 1457, Lord of Bergh purchased the castle and the heerlijkheid. In 1711, it was transferred to the Dros of Didam. The castle was demolished around 1920. In 1840, Loil was home to 680 people.

The grist mill De Korenbloem was built in 1855. It was restored in 1970 and 1988–1989. The Roman Catholic church opened in 1910 and is a church without a tower. Loil has become a single urban area with Didam, and the postal authorities have placed it under Didam, but it has not been annexed.

== Gallery ==
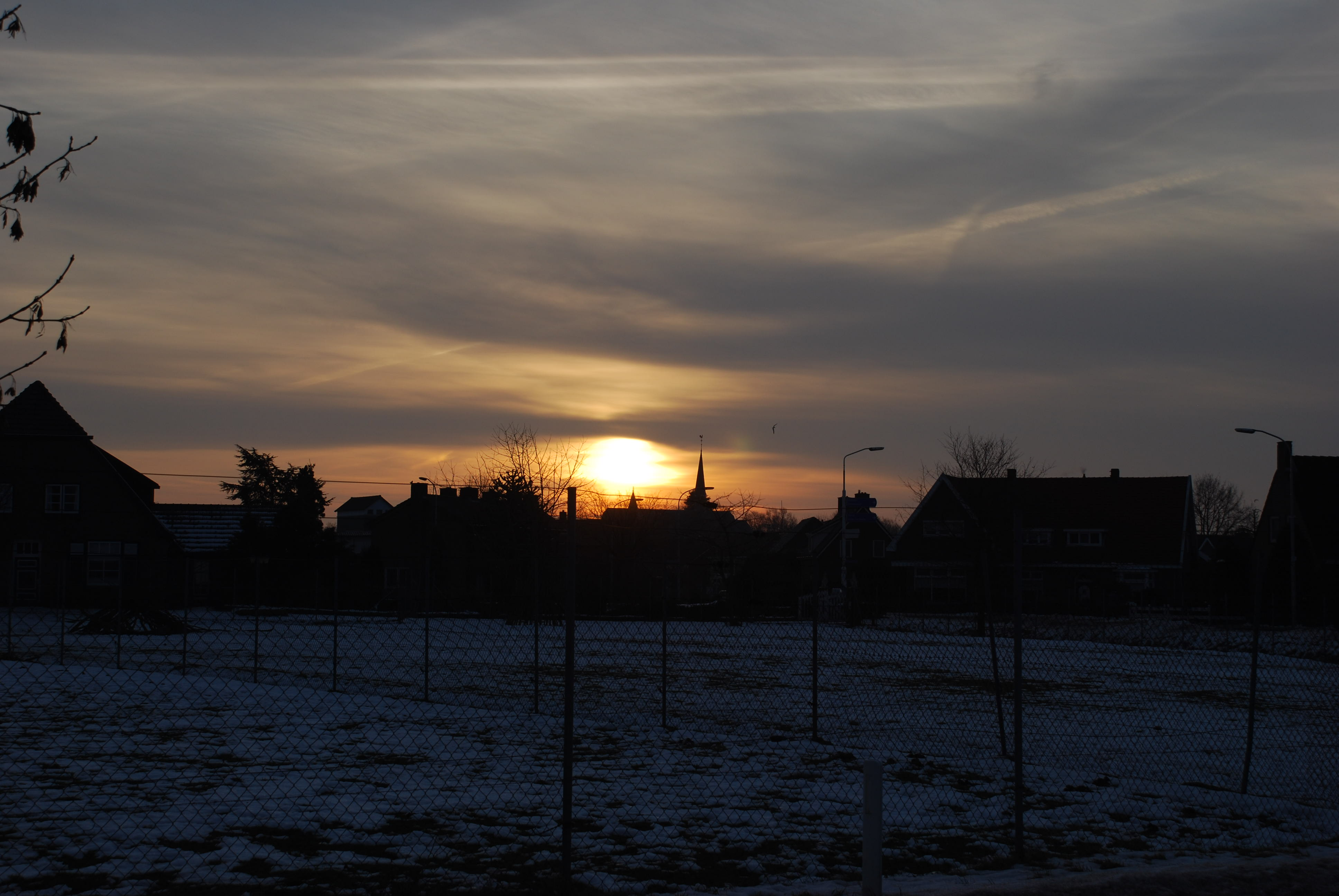
Sunrise in Loil

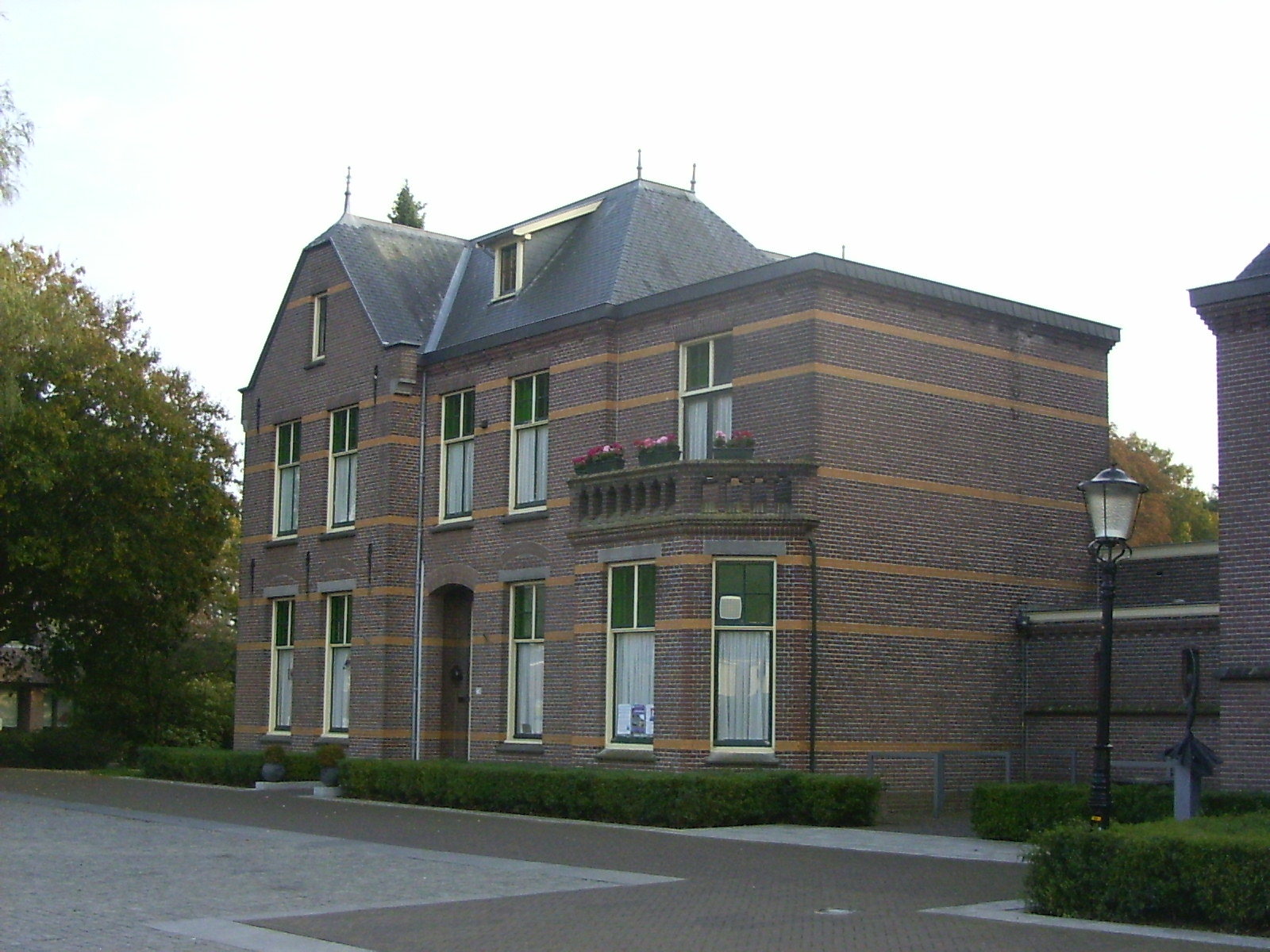
House in Loil

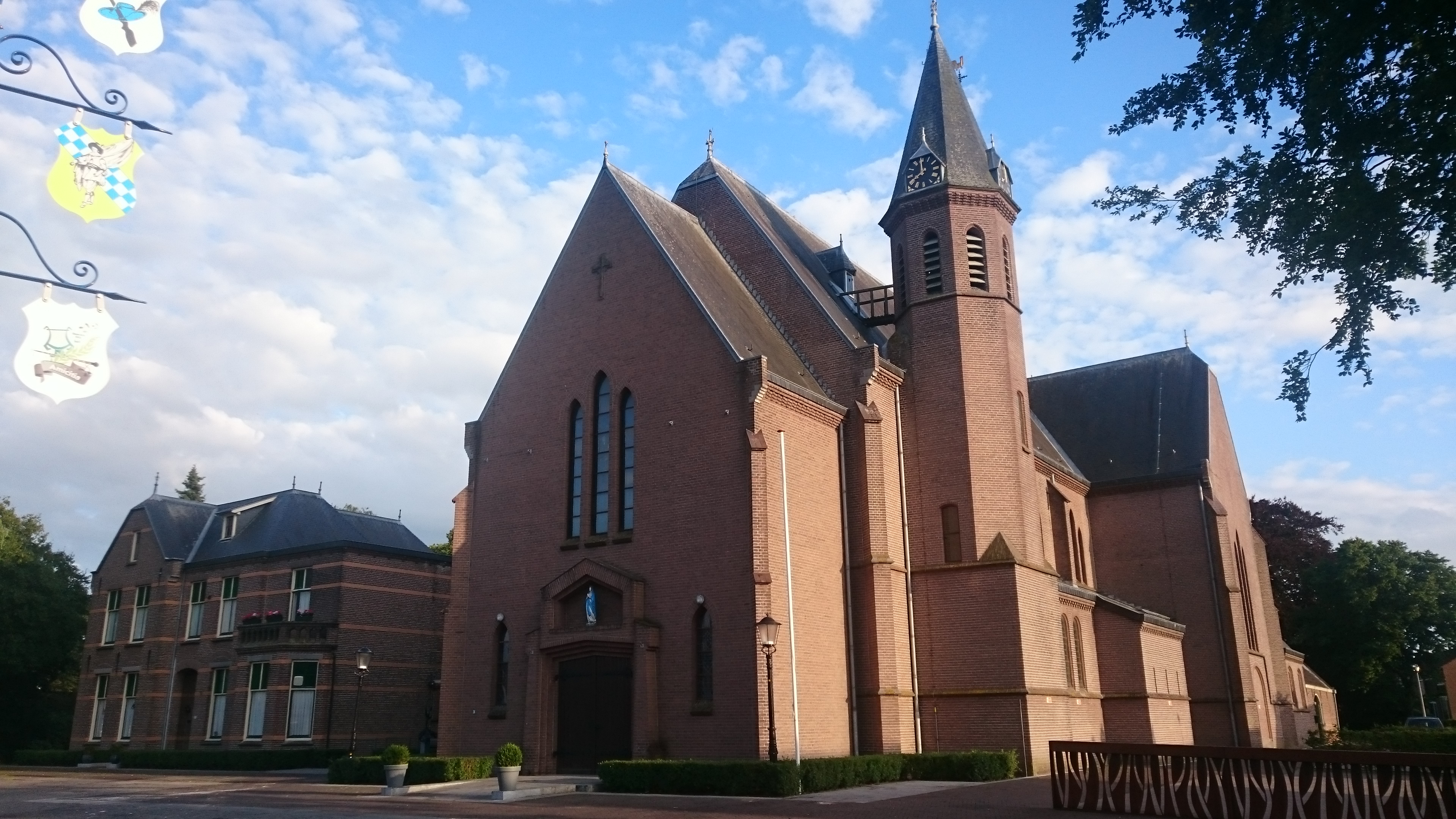
Church in Loil
