= Loerbeek =

- Village
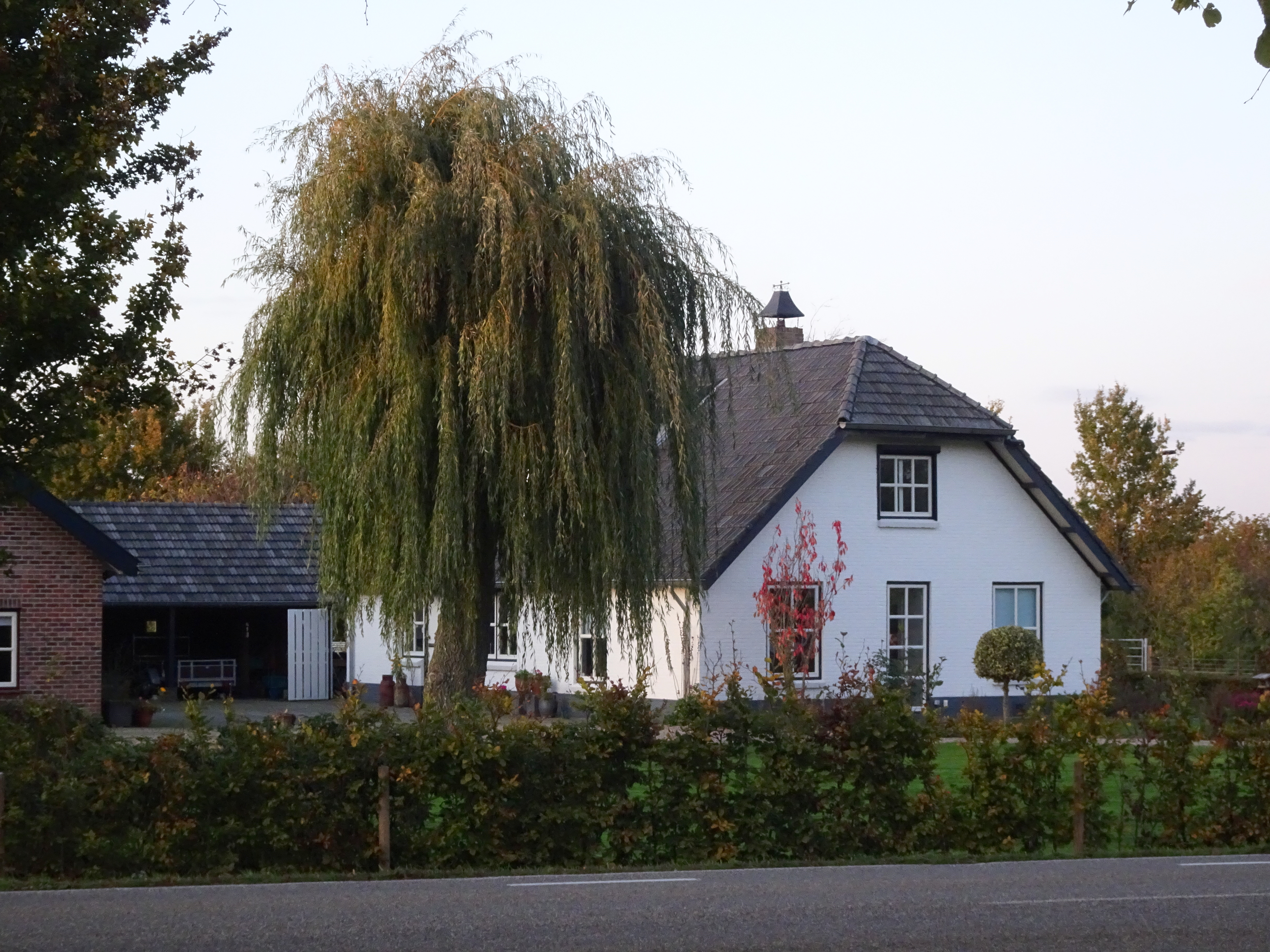
- Farm in Loerbeek

- Location in the Netherlands Loerbeek (Netherlands)
- Coordinates: 51°55′16″N 6°11′41″E
- Country: Netherlands
- Province: Gelderland
- Municipality: Montferland

Area
  - Total: 4.25 km^{2} (1.64 sq mi)
- Elevation: 18 m (59 ft)

Population (2021)
  - Total: 695
  - Density: 164/km^{2} (424/sq mi)
- Time zone: UTC+1 (CET)
  - Summer (DST): UTC+2 (CEST)
- Postal code: 7036 & 7037
- Dialing code: 0316

Loerbeek is a village in the eastern Netherlands, near the German border. It belongs to the municipality of Montferland just like the adjescent villages Beek and Nieuw-Dijk, near the lower parts of the Bergherbos, a large forest with hills, where people can walk, mountain-bike and ride horses.

It was first mentioned in 1240 as Loberke. The etymology is unknown.

== Gallery ==
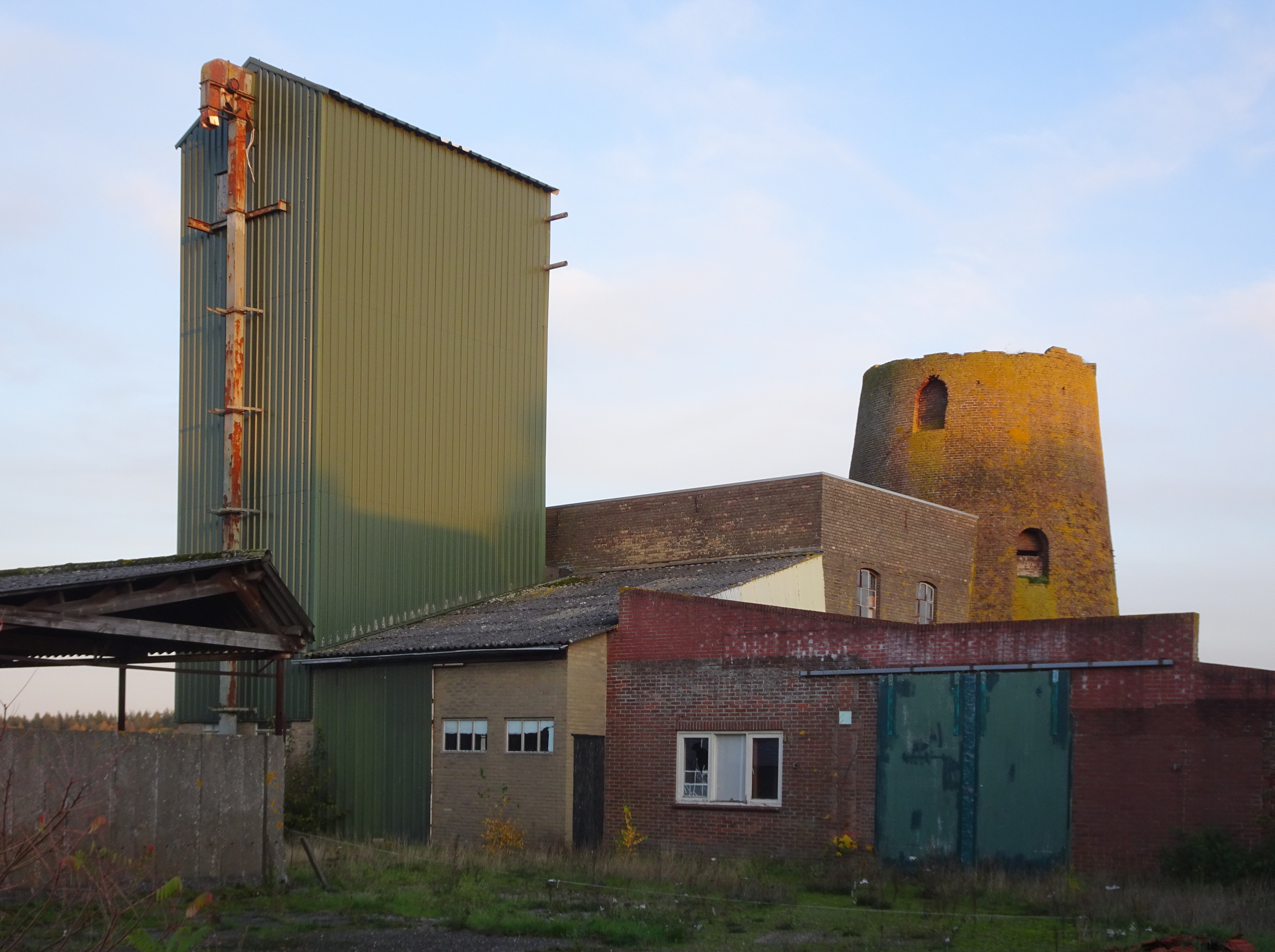
Remains of the former windmill (1845)

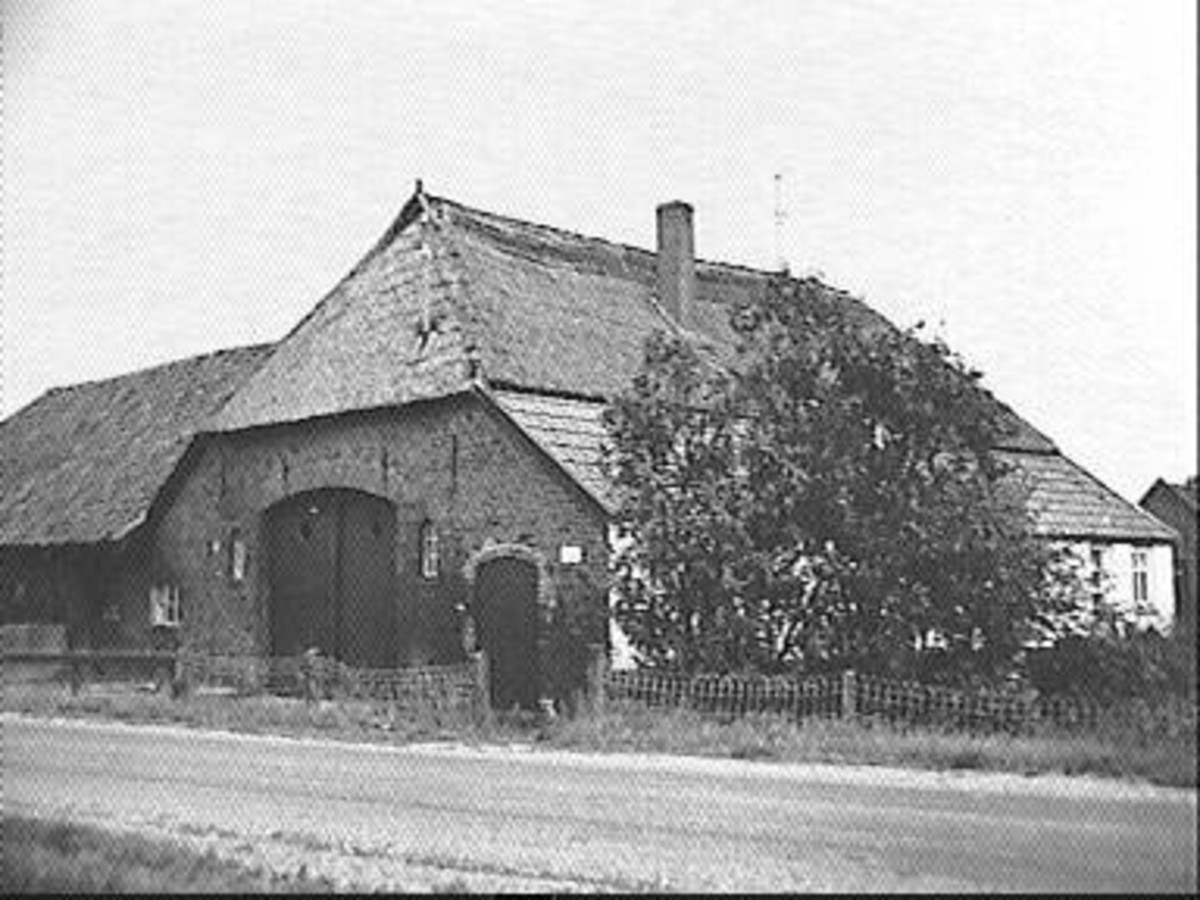
Farm in Loerbeek
