= S.B. Williams =

Nigerian sports administrator

Sebastian Babatunde Williams was a Nigerian sports administrator who was chairman of the Local Organizing Committee of the 1995 FIFA World Youth Championship which was initially intended to be hosted by Nigeria. He was a businessman, and sports philanthropist and served for many years as the Chairman of the Nigerian Sports Commission.

Williams was born in 1929, he attended St Paul's, and completed his education in Nigeria at St Gregory's College, Lagos where he played football and cricket. From 1953 to 1955, he trained as a marine engineer at Cardiff Technical College.

Williams was a member of the Nigeria Football Association between 1988 and 1989, he was also a traveling fan and was known to personally fund hotel bills and other expenses of players. He was involved in the recruitment of Clemens Westerhof, who led the coaching staff to victory in the 1994 Nations Cup. He was nominated by the administration of Sani Abacha to prepare Nigeria for the 1995 Under 21 World Youth Championship which was later botched, Nigeria hosted the tournament four years later in 1999.
