= Zeddam =

- Village
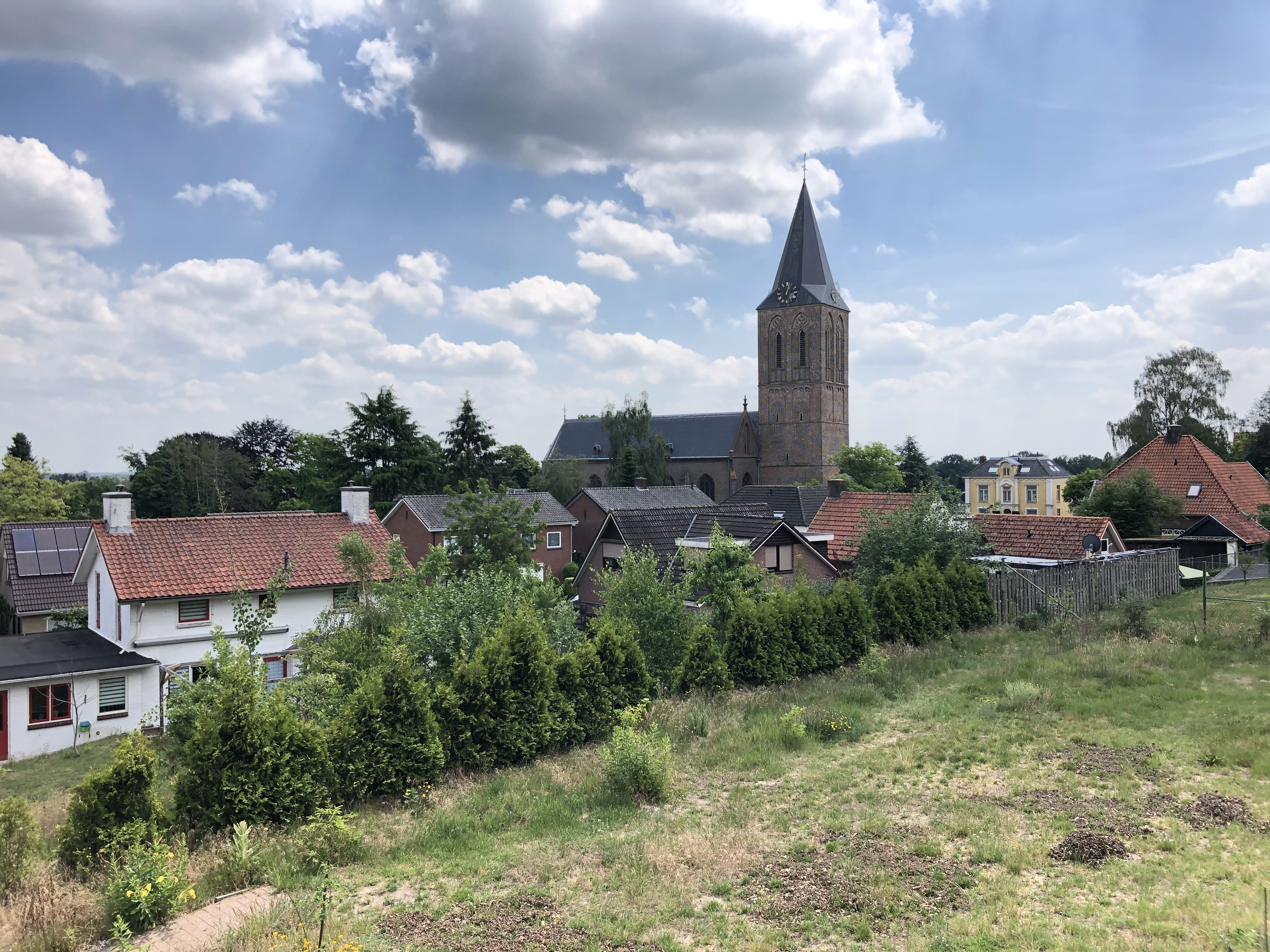
- View of Zeddam

- Coat of arms

- Location in the Netherlands Zeddam (Netherlands)
- Coordinates: 51.90311°N 6.25694°E
- Country: Netherlands
- Province: Gelderland
- Municipality: Montferland

Area
  - Total: 3.64 km^{2} (1.41 sq mi)
- Elevation: 18 m (59 ft)

Population (2021)
  - Total: 2,645
  - Density: 727/km^{2} (1,880/sq mi)
- Time zone: UTC+1 (CET)
  - Summer (DST): UTC+2 (CEST)
- Postal code: 7038
- Dialing code: 0314

Zeddam is a village in the Dutch province of Gelderland. It is located in the municipality of Montferland, about 7 km south of Doetinchem.

Zeddam was a separate municipality until 1821, when it was merged with Bergh.

== History ==
Zeddam was first mentioned between 1139 and 1148 as Sydehem. The etymology is unclear. Zeddam is located on the flank of the Paasberg along the road from 's-Heerenberg to Doetinchem. It used to belong to the Lord of Bergh. The St. Oswaldus Church has a tower from around 1500 with a 14th-century base. The church dates from 1891. Castle Montferland was a castle from the 9th century. The castle Uplade which was destroyed in 1066 may reference the same castle. It was demolished in 1527. In 1699, it was replaced by an estate which nowadays serves as a restaurant. In 1840, it was home to 458 people.

The Grafelijke Korenmolen is a tower mill that was first mentioned in 1451. In 1974, a horse mill was constructed next to mill in case there is no wind.

== Notable people from Zeddam ==
Thomas ten Brinke (born 2005), racing driver

== Gallery ==
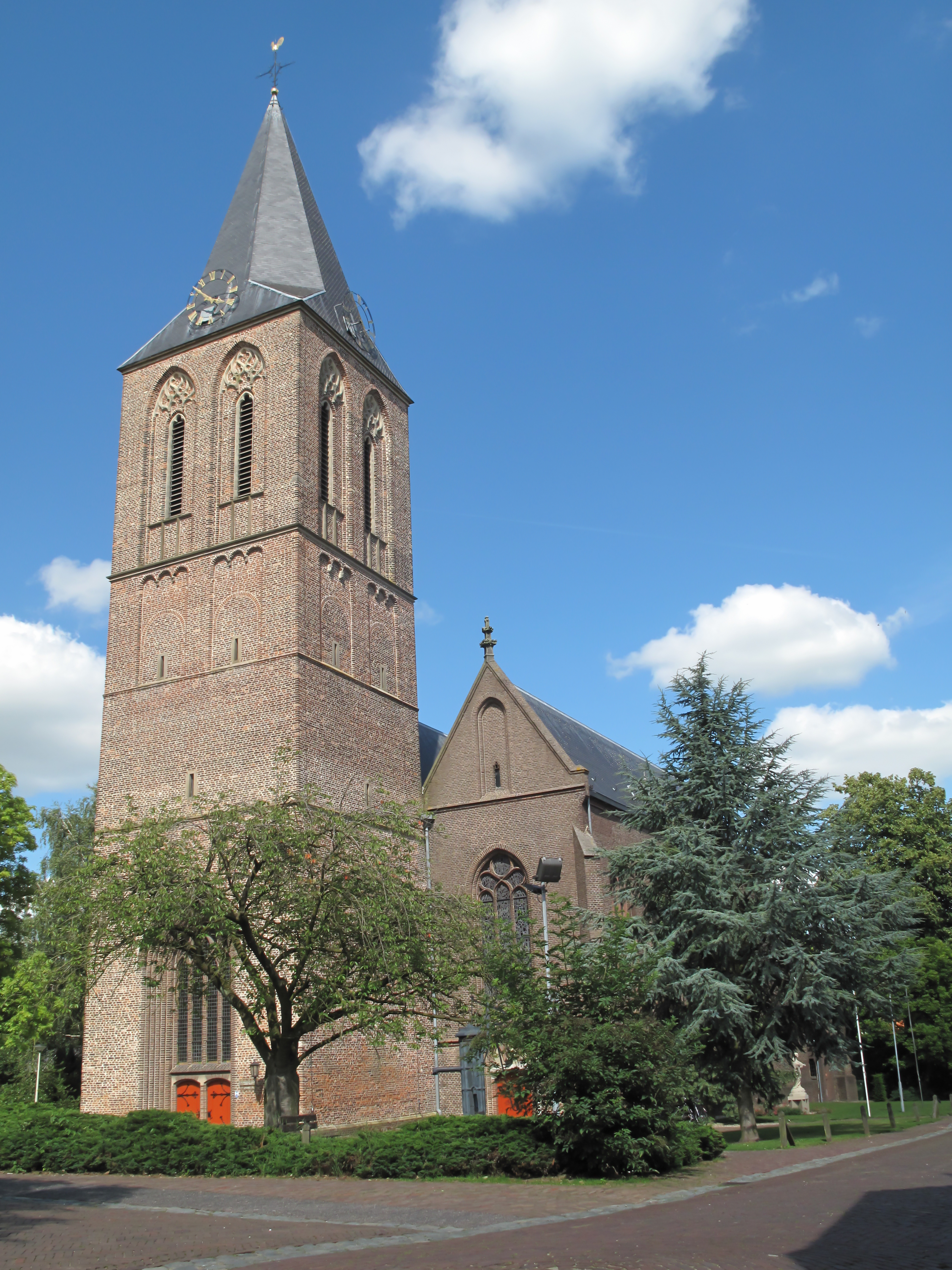
Zeddam, church: de Sint Oswaldkerk

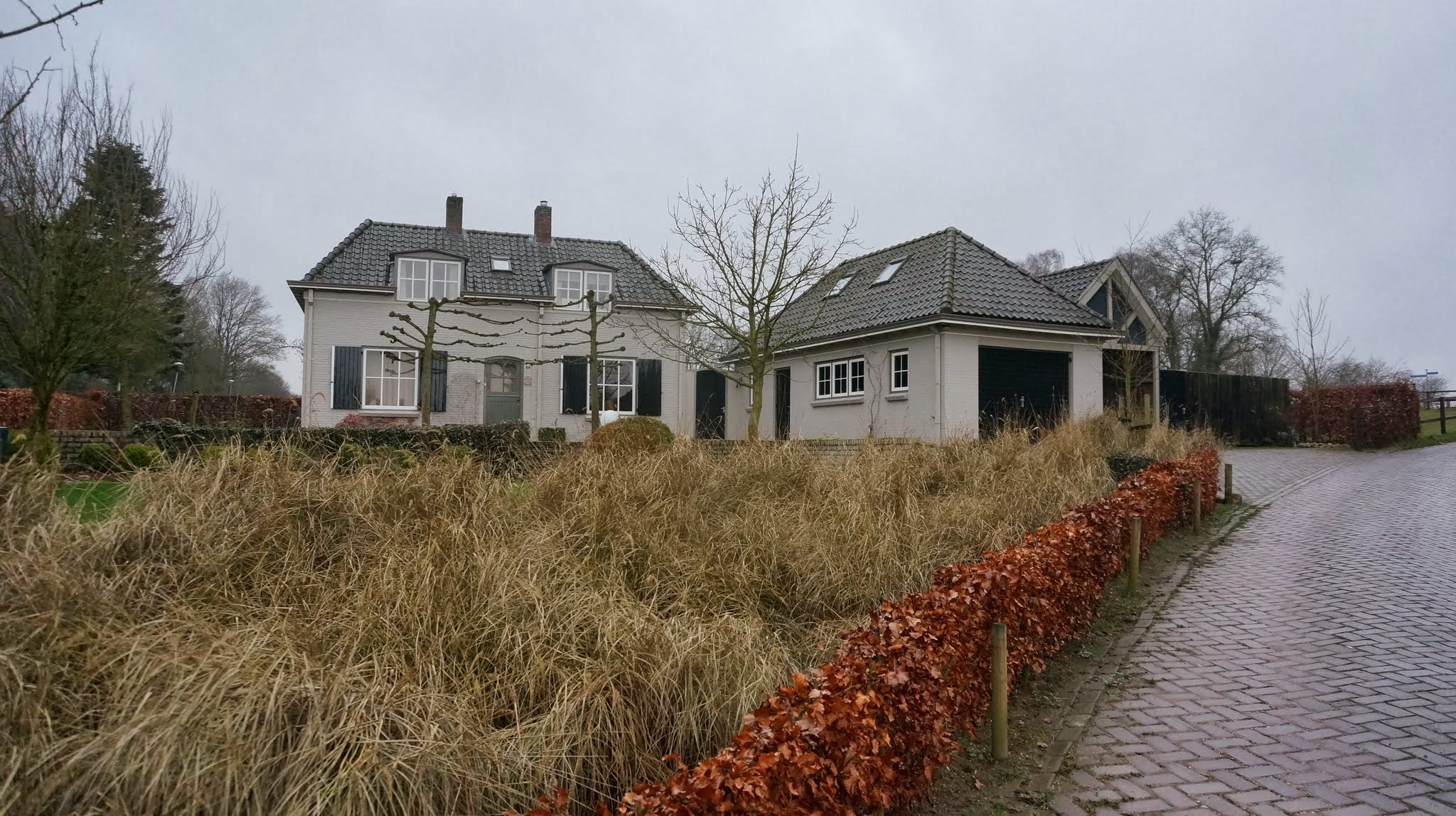
House in Zeddam

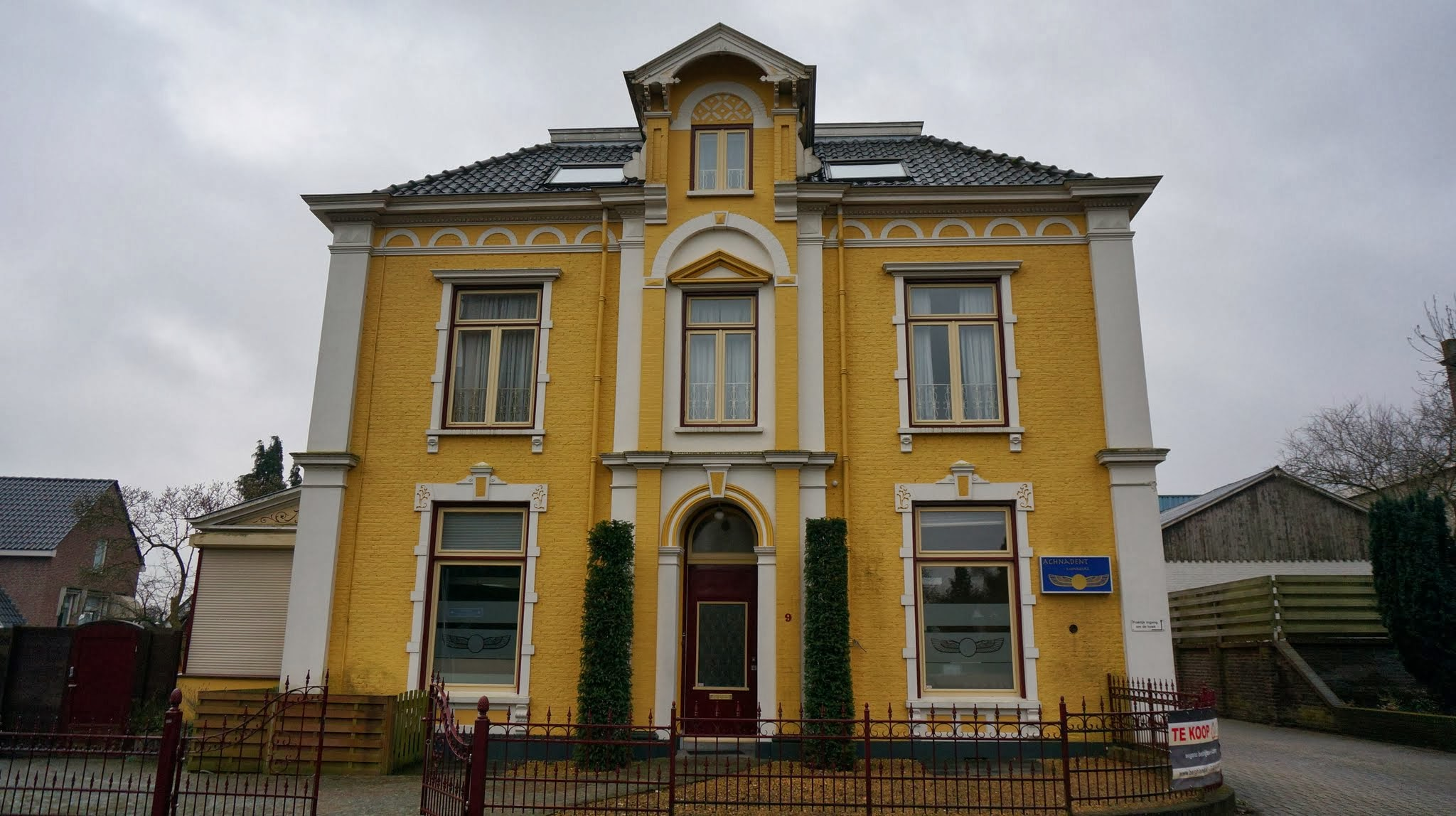
Villa in Zeddam

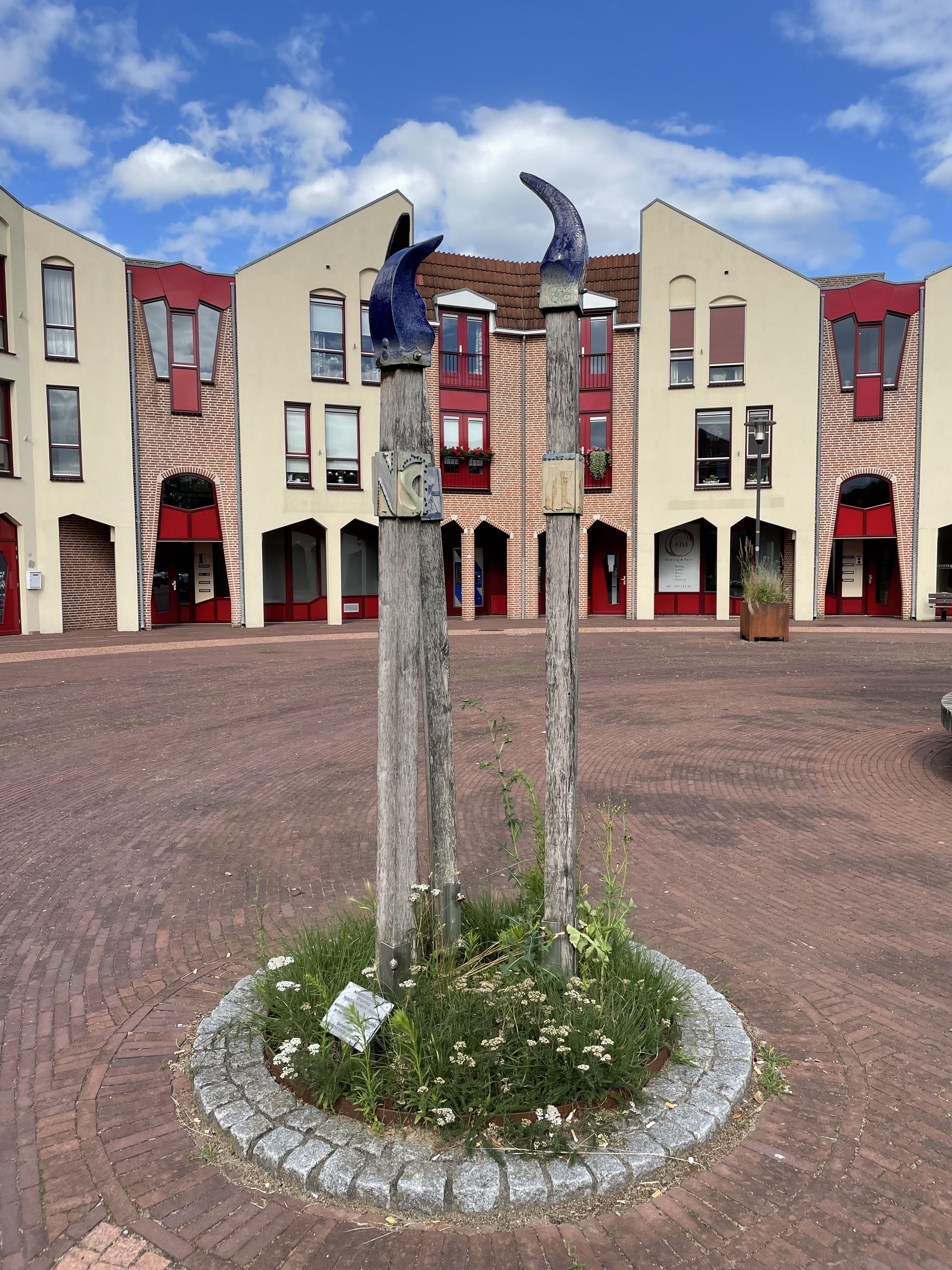
Three mile poles
