= Azewijn =

- Village
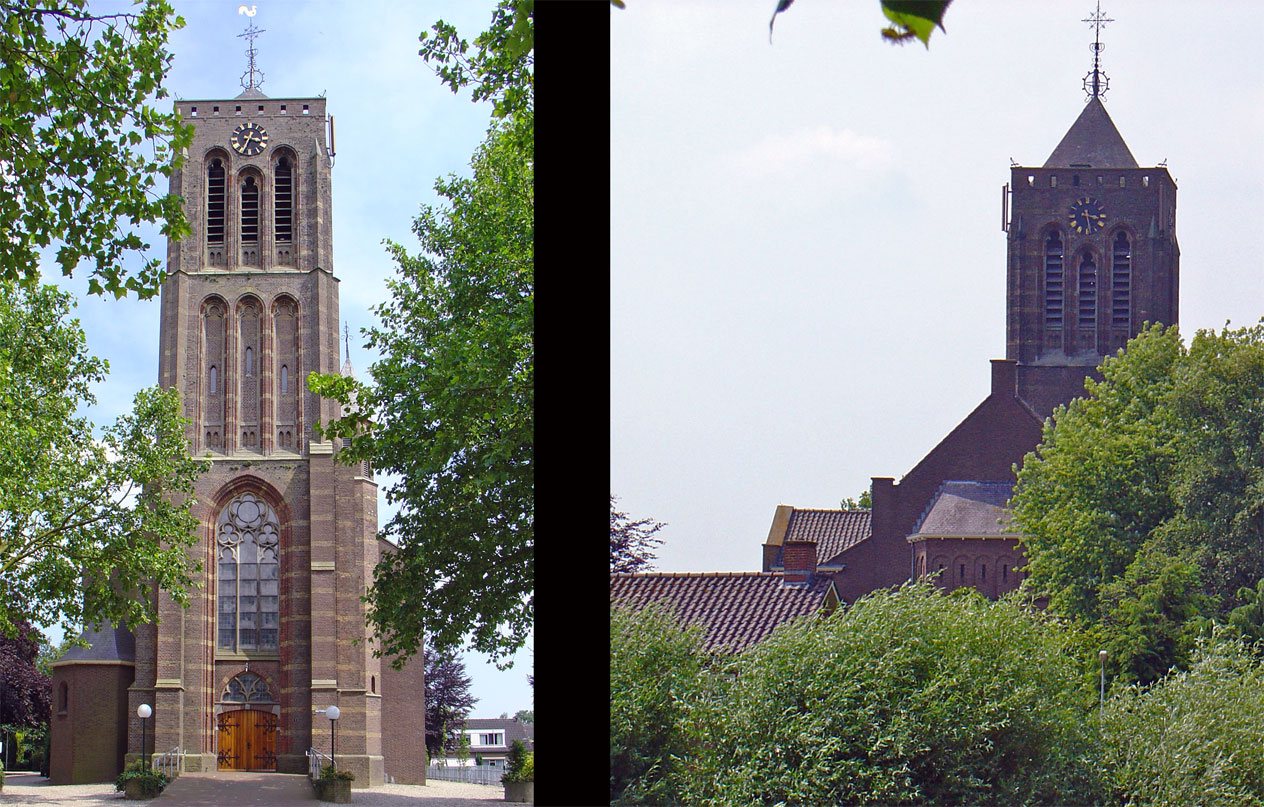
- St Matthew's Church, Azewijn

- Location in the Netherlands Azewijn (Netherlands)
- Coordinates: 51°53′8″N 6°18′15″E
- Country: Netherlands
- Province: Gelderland
- Municipality: Montferland

Area
  - Total: 12.96 km^{2} (5.00 sq mi)
- Elevation: 15 m (49 ft)

Population (2021)
  - Total: 910
  - Density: 70/km^{2} (180/sq mi)
- Time zone: UTC+1 (CET)
  - Summer (DST): UTC+2 (CEST)
- Postal code: 7045
- Dialing code: 0314

Azewijn is a village in the Dutch province of Gelderland and the municipality Montferland, and is about 3 km east of the town of 's-Heerenberg.

The larger part of Azewijn is known as "Groot-Azewijn" (Greater Azewijn), with the hamlet "Klein-Azewijn" (Lesser Azewijn) about 1 km to the north.

Azewijn was first mentioned in 1025 as 'Asawon'; but the etymology is unclear. The village belonged to the Kingdom of Prussia before it became part of the Netherlands in 1816. Population in 1840 was 525. St Matthew's Church at Azewijn was built in 1891. It was burnt down by Germans on 31 March 1945, and was rebuilt in 1950–1951.
