= Beek, Montferland =

Beek
- Village
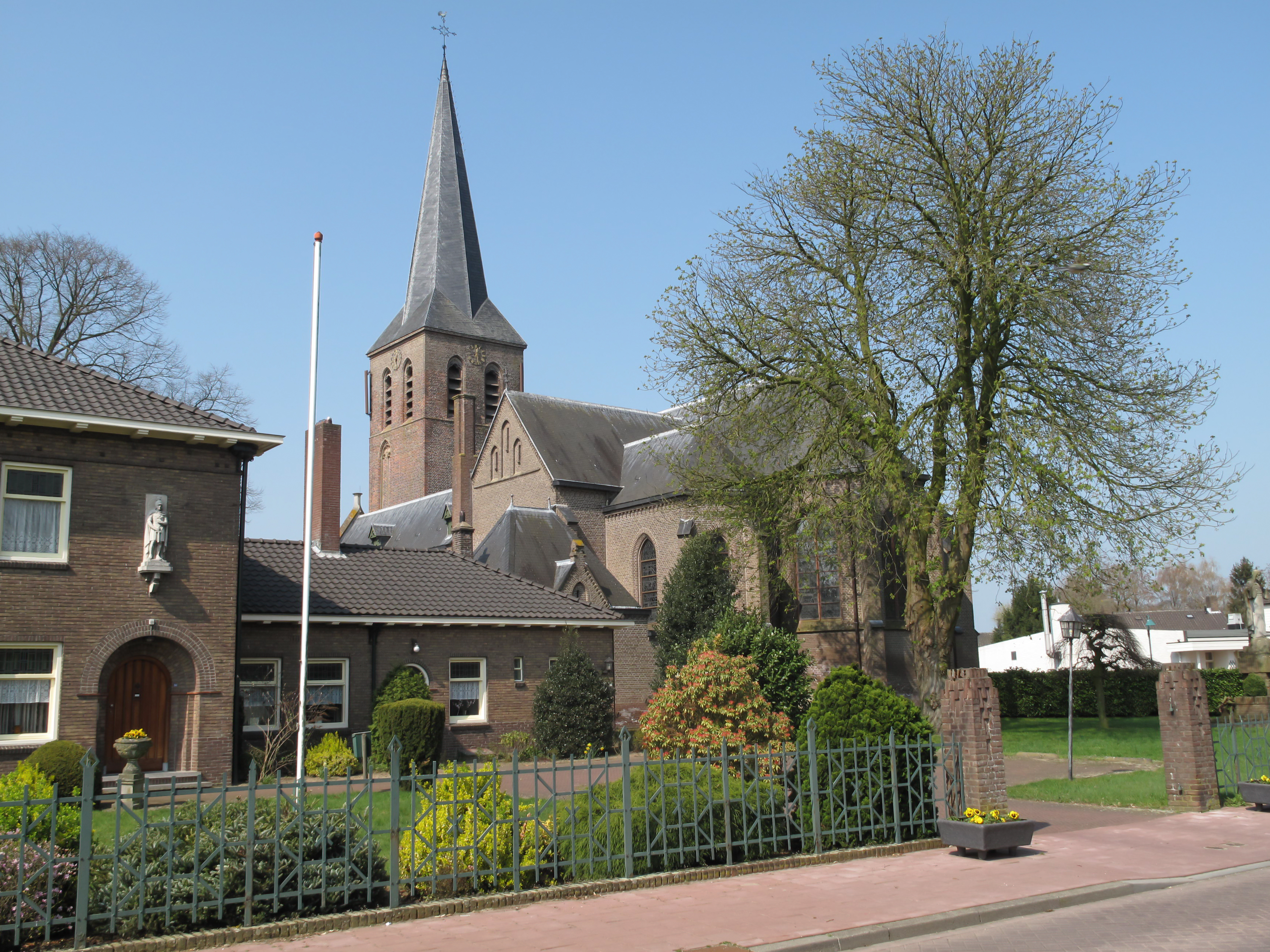
- Church in Beek

- Flag Coat of arms

- Location in the Netherlands Beek (Netherlands)
- Coordinates: 51°54′21″N 6°11′16″E
- Country: Netherlands
- Province: Gelderland
- Municipality: Montferland

Area
  - Total: 8.19 km^{2} (3.16 sq mi)
- Elevation: 12 m (39 ft)

Population (2021)
  - Total: 1,560
  - Density: 190/km^{2} (493/sq mi)
- Time zone: UTC+1 (CET)
  - Summer (DST): UTC+2 (CEST)
- Postal code: 6941
- Dialing code: 0316

Beek is a village in the Dutch province of Gelderland. It is located in the municipality of Montferland, about 5 km southeast of Didam.

== History ==
It was first mentioned in 1206 as Beke, and means brook. The St Martinus Church dates from 1868. The tower was built in 1884 and has 15th century elements. The guild house St. Jan was constructed in 1897. In 1840, it was home to 573 people.

== Notable people ==
- Clemens Westerhof (born 1940), football manager

== Gallery ==
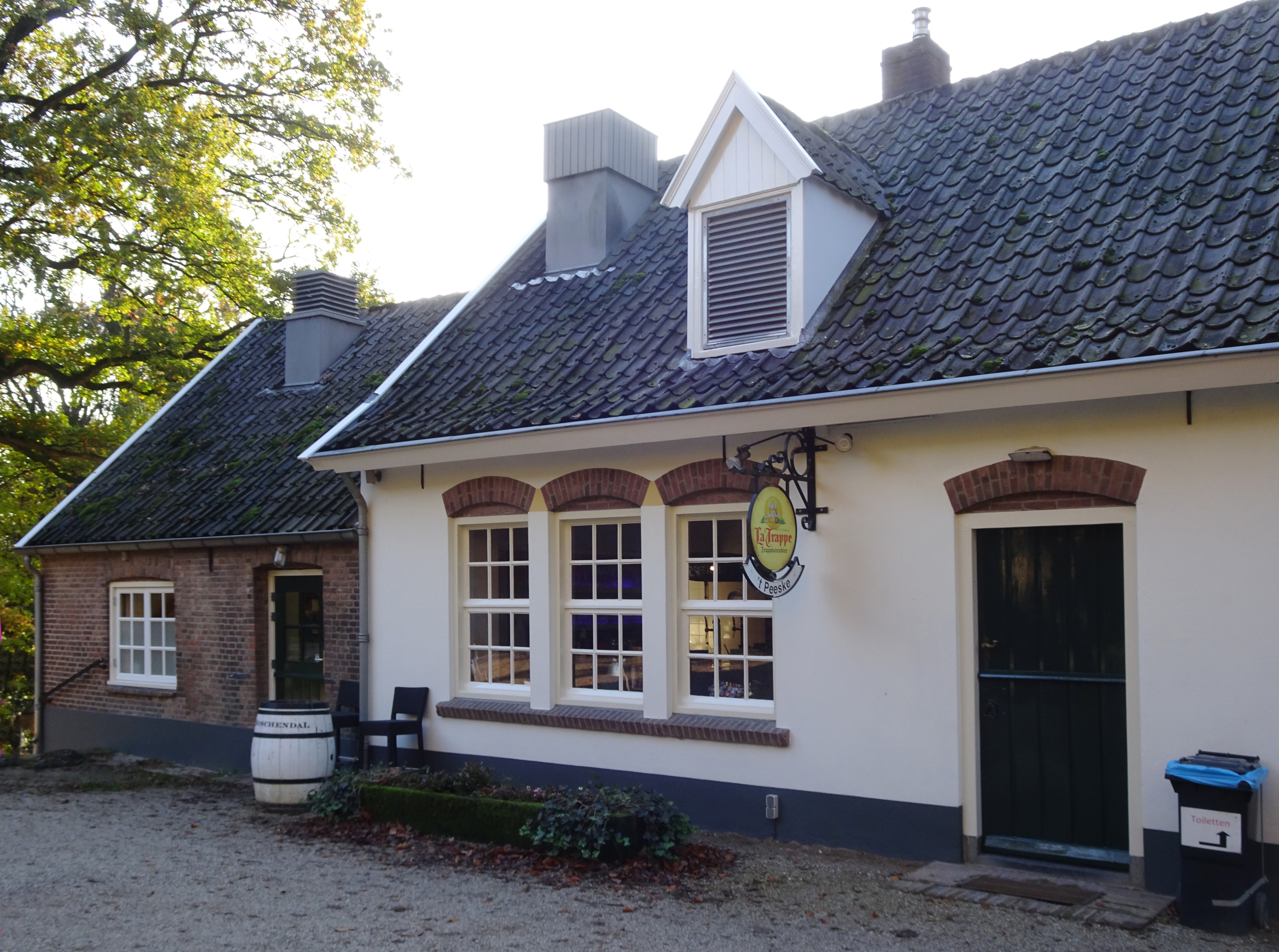
Pub in Beek

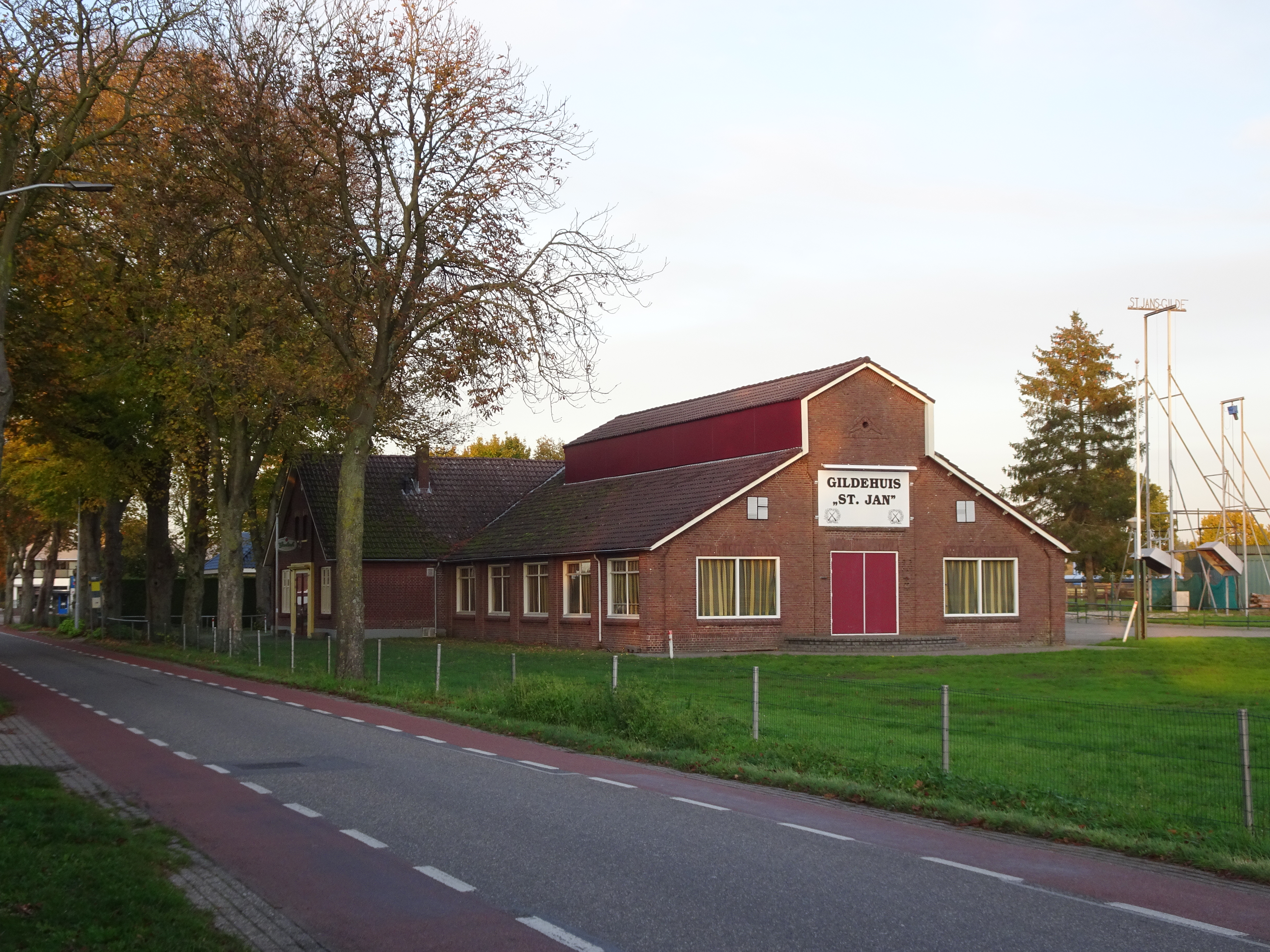
Guild hose in Beek

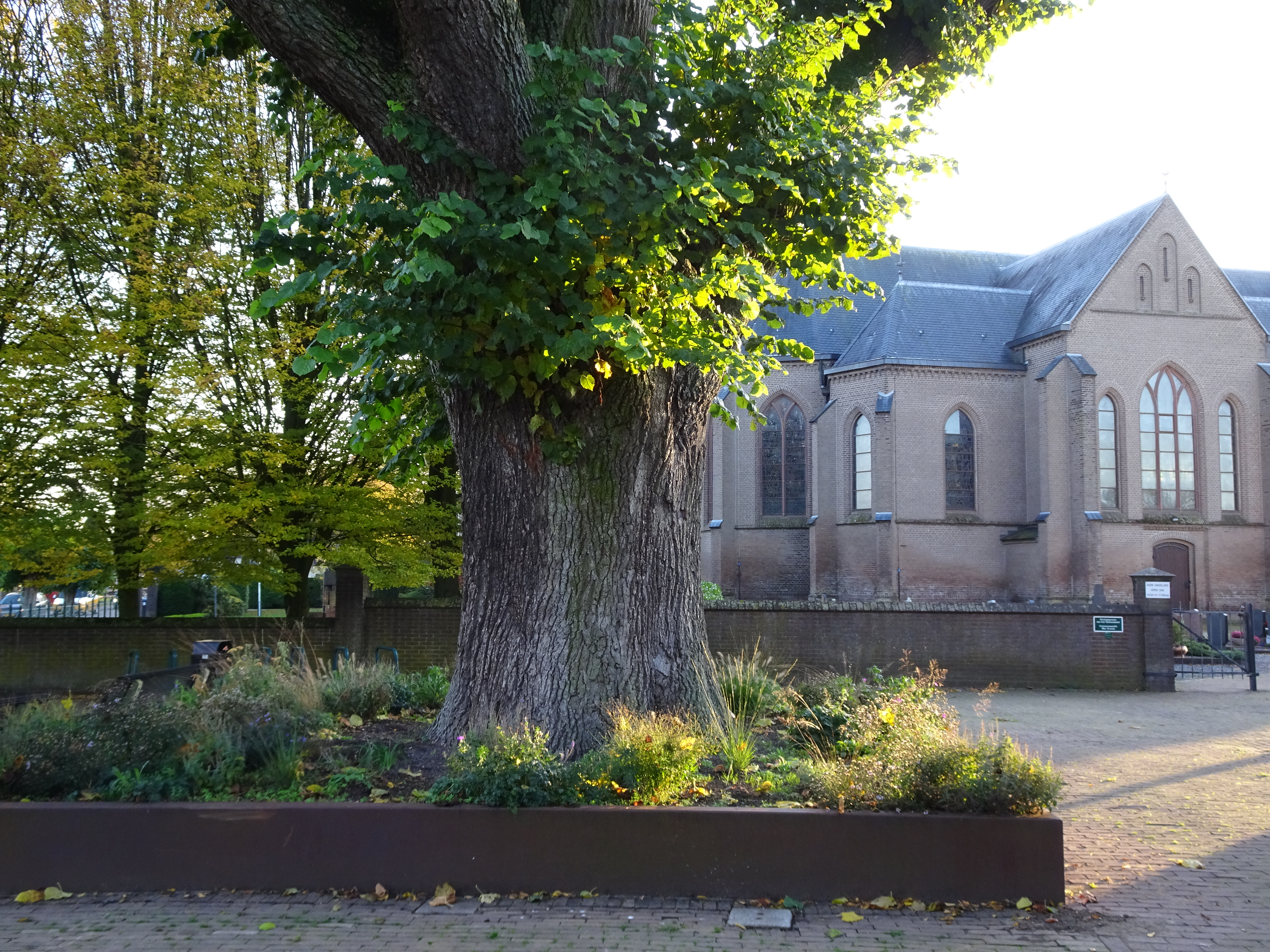
Tree in front of church

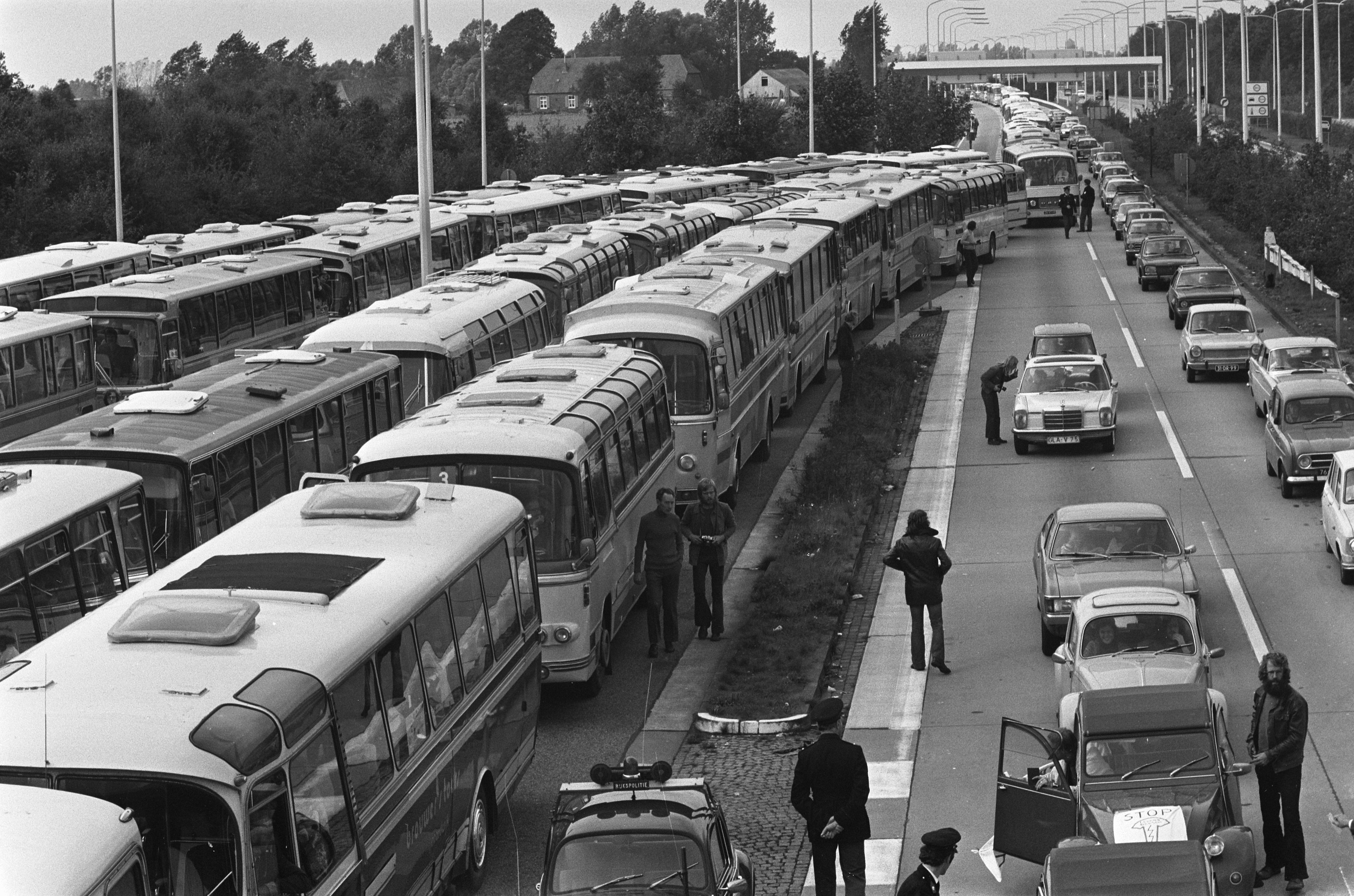
Demonstration against the nuclear reactor in Kalkar causes traffic jam at border crossing
