= Montferland =

- Municipality
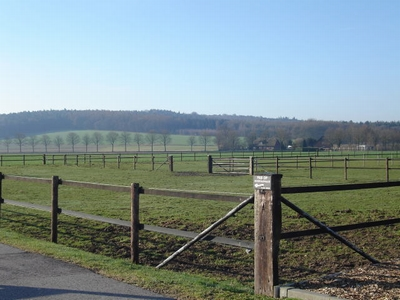
- Looking towards the Montferland hills

- Flag Coat of arms

- Location in Gelderland
- Coordinates: 51°56′N 6°8′E
- Country: Netherlands
- Province: Gelderland
- Established: 1 January 2005

Government
  - Body: Municipal council
  - Mayor: Harry de Vries (acting) (CDA)

Area
  - Total: 106.64 km^{2} (41.17 sq mi)
  - Land: 105.70 km^{2} (40.81 sq mi)
  - Water: 0.94 km^{2} (0.36 sq mi)
- Elevation: 13 m (43 ft)
- Highest elevation: 93 m (305 ft)

Population (January 2021)
  - Total: 36,031
  - Density: 341/km^{2} (880/sq mi)
- Time zone: UTC+1 (CET)
  - Summer (DST): UTC+2 (CEST)
- Postcode: 6940–6942, 7035–7048
- Area code: 0314, 0316
- Website: www.montferland.info

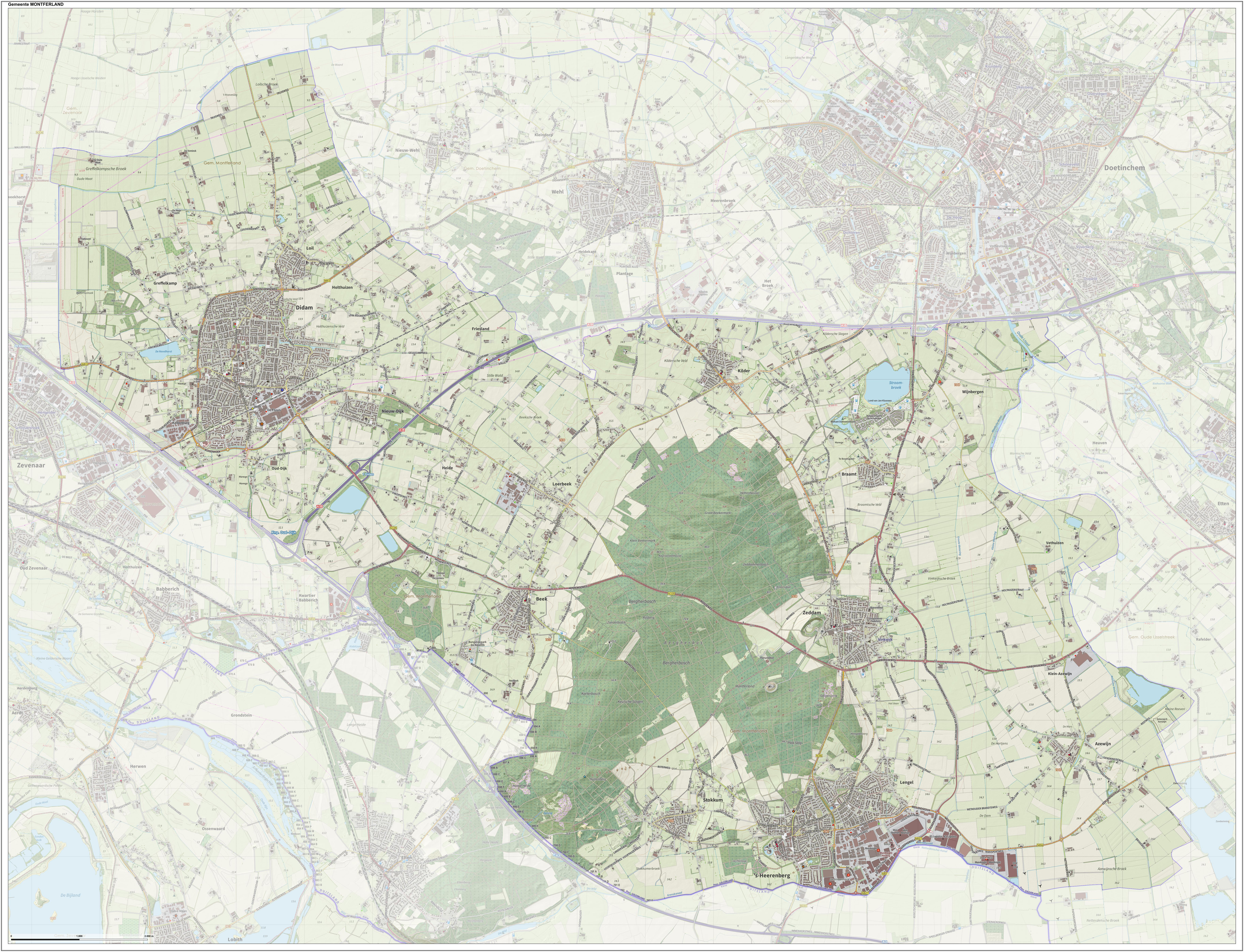
Topographic map of Montferland (June 2015)

Montferland (Dutch pronunciation: [ˈmɔntfərlɑnt]) is a municipality in the Dutch province of Gelderland. It was created on 1 January 2005 from the amalgamation of the former municipalities of Bergh and Didam.

== Population centres ==
Formerly part of Bergh municipality:

- Azewijn
- Beek
- Braamt
- Kilder
- Lengel
- Loerbeek
- 's-Heerenberg
- Stokkum
- Vethuizen
- Wijnbergen
- Zeddam

Formerly part of Didam municipality:

- Didam
- Greffelkamp
- Holthuizen
- Loil
- Nieuw-Dijk
- Oud-Dijk

== Gallery ==
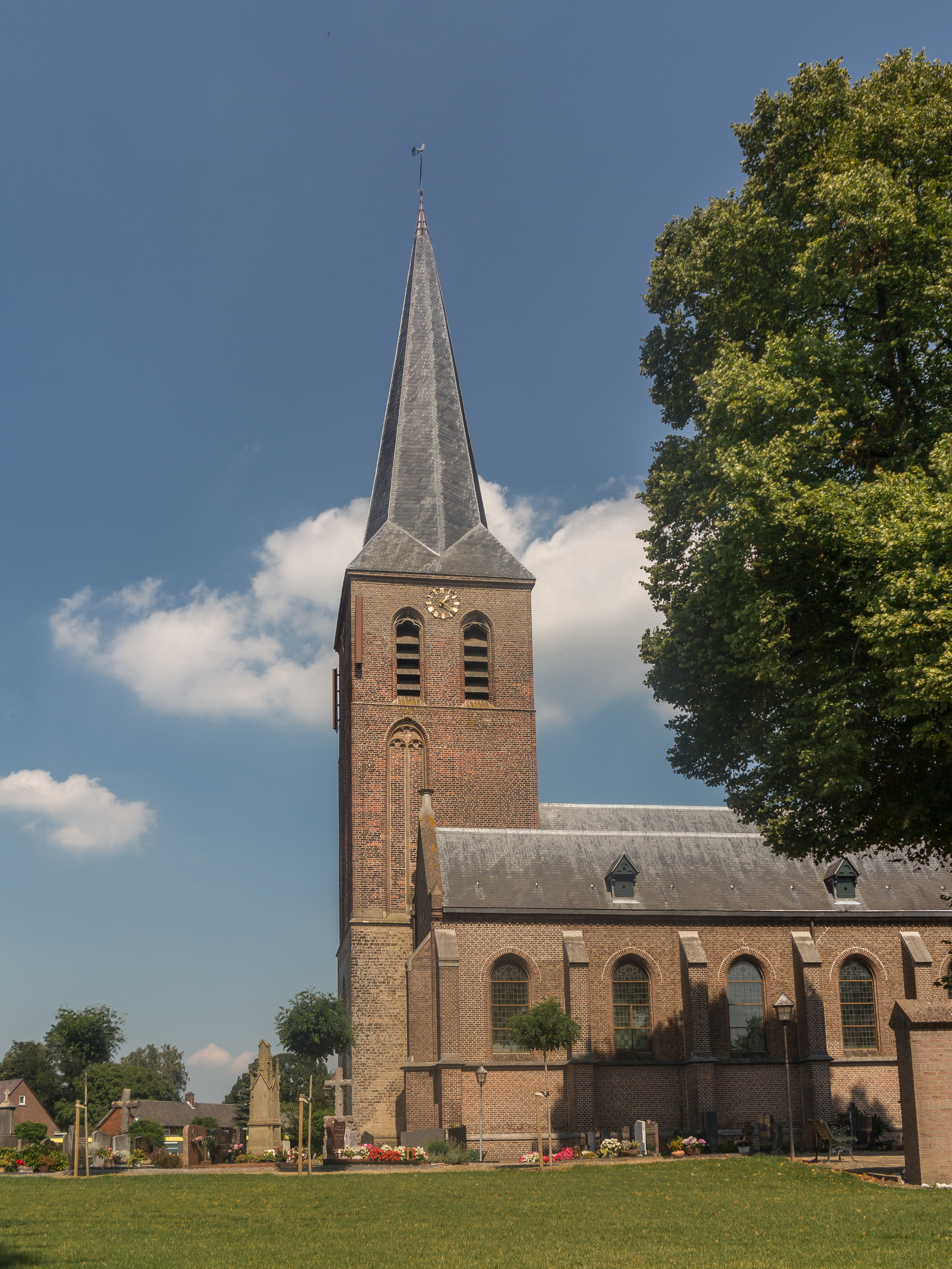
St Martin's church in Beek

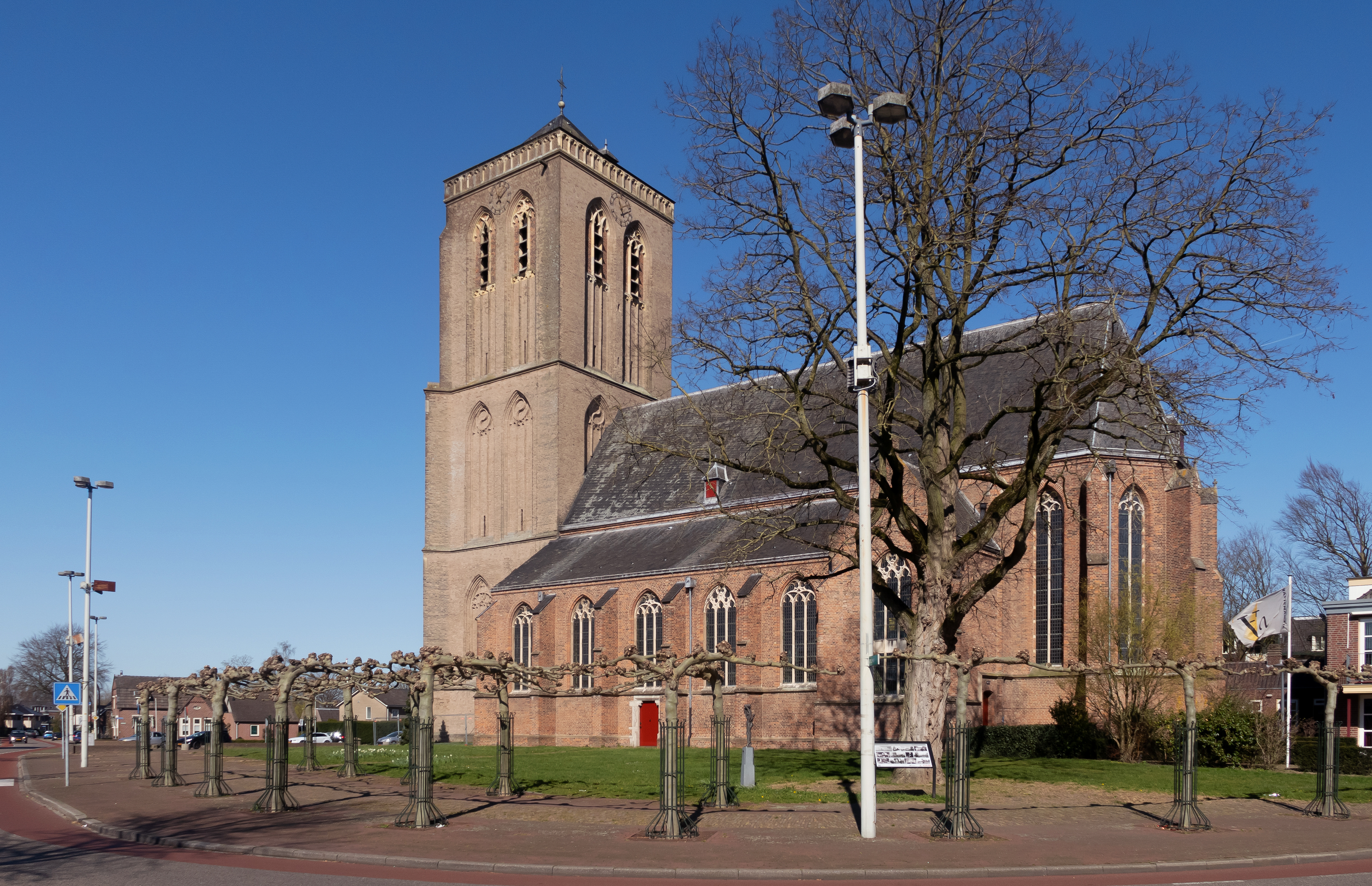
Didam church

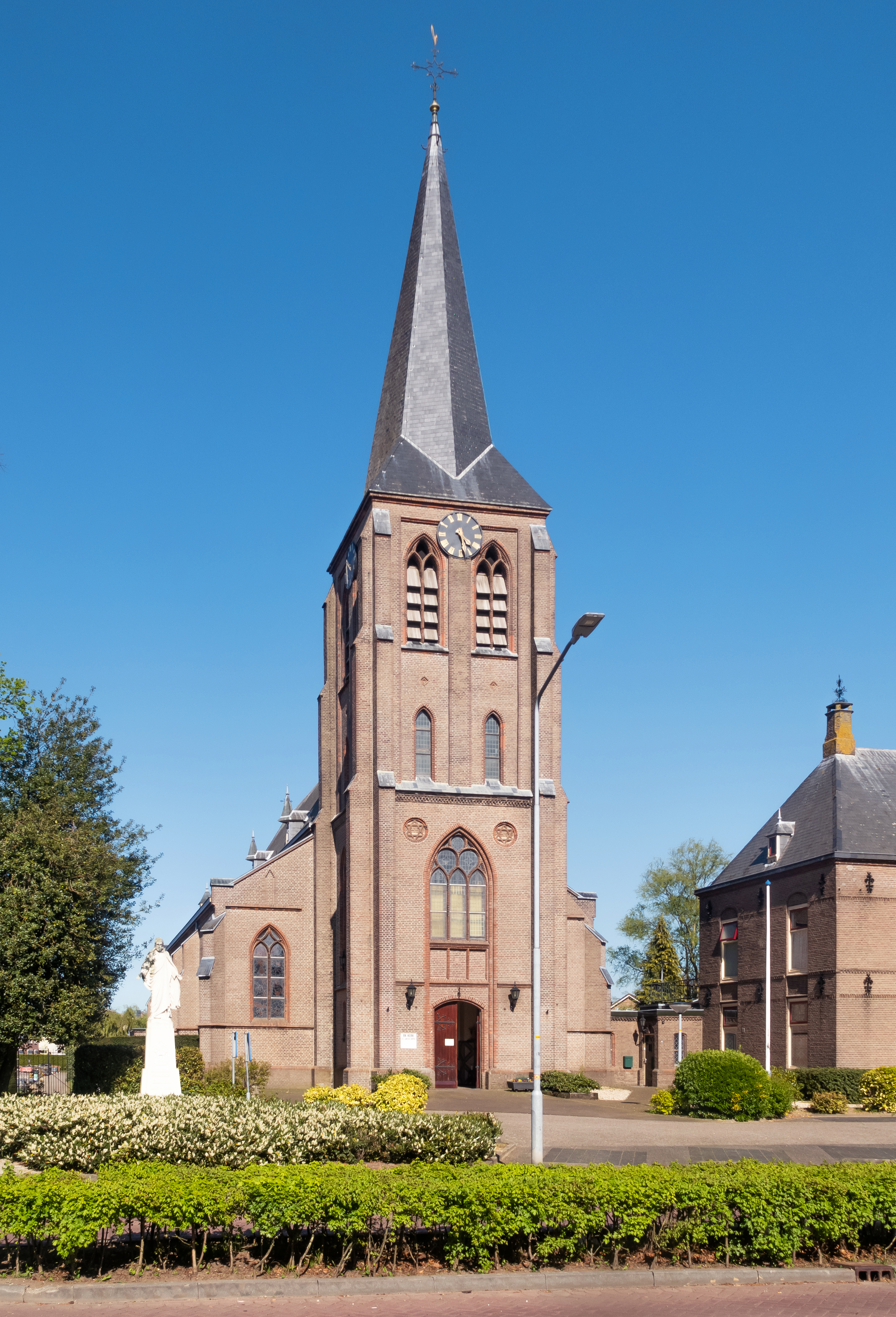
Kilder church

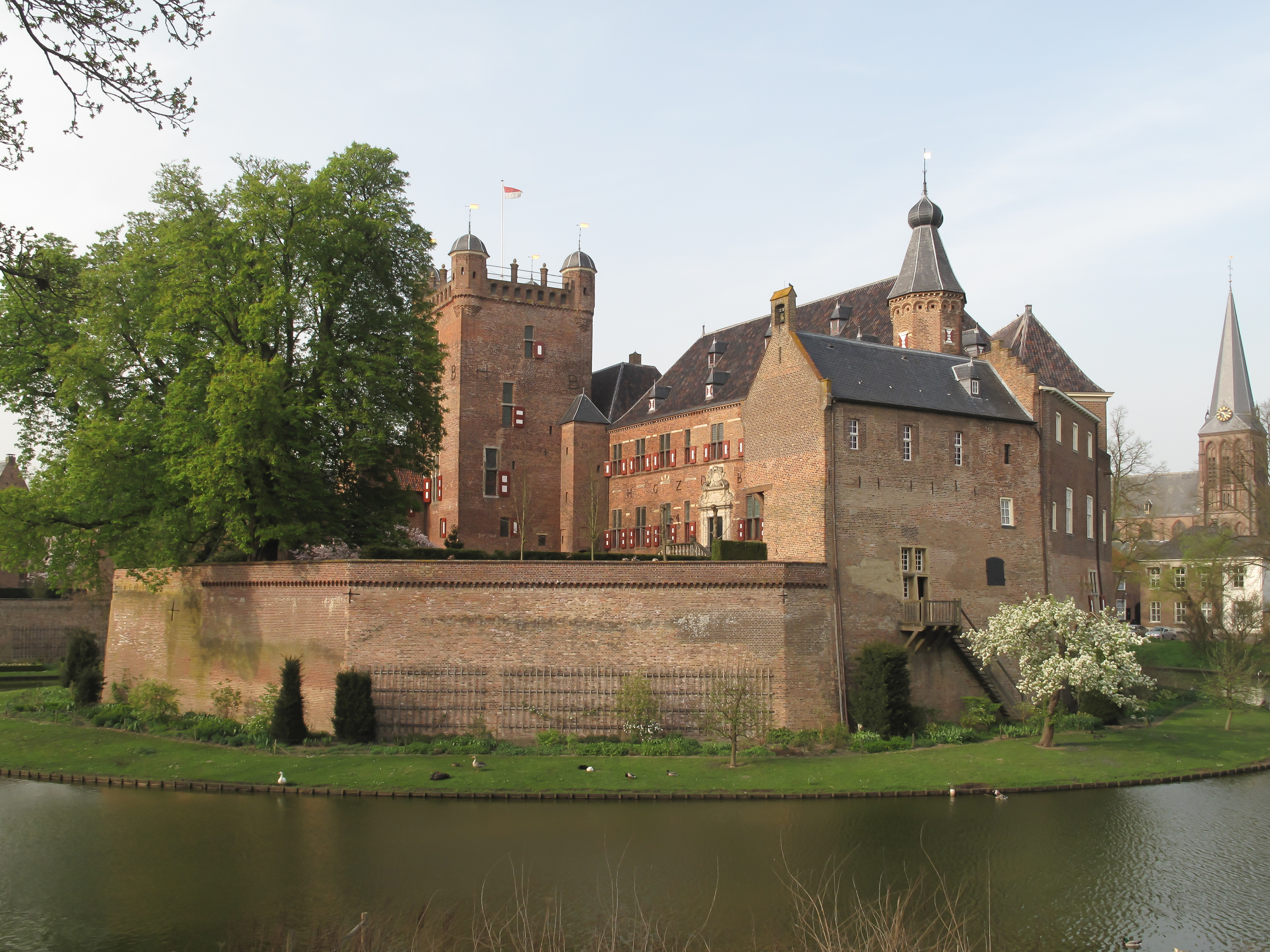
Huis Bergh castle in
's-Heerenberg

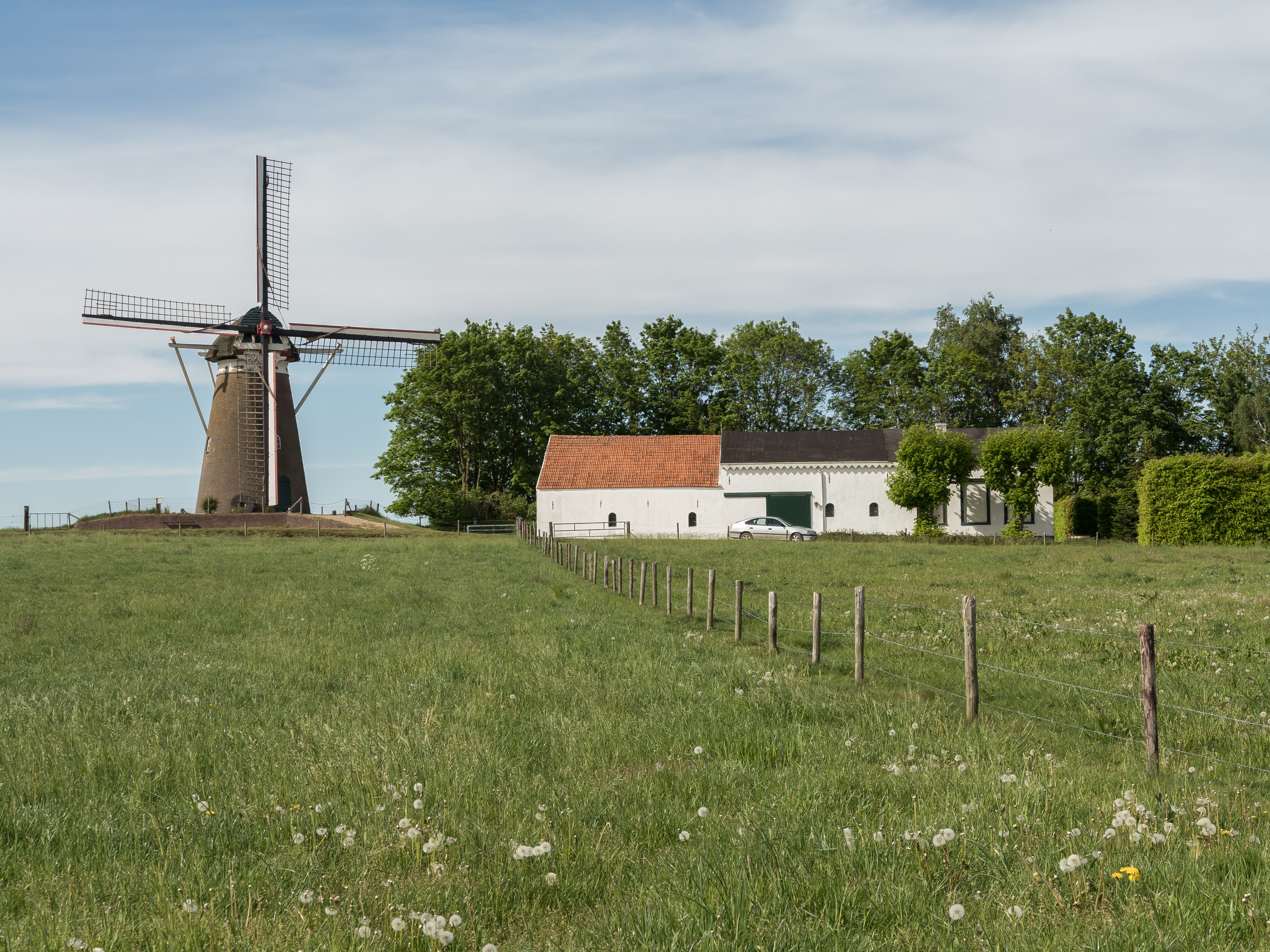
Düffels Möl in Stokkum

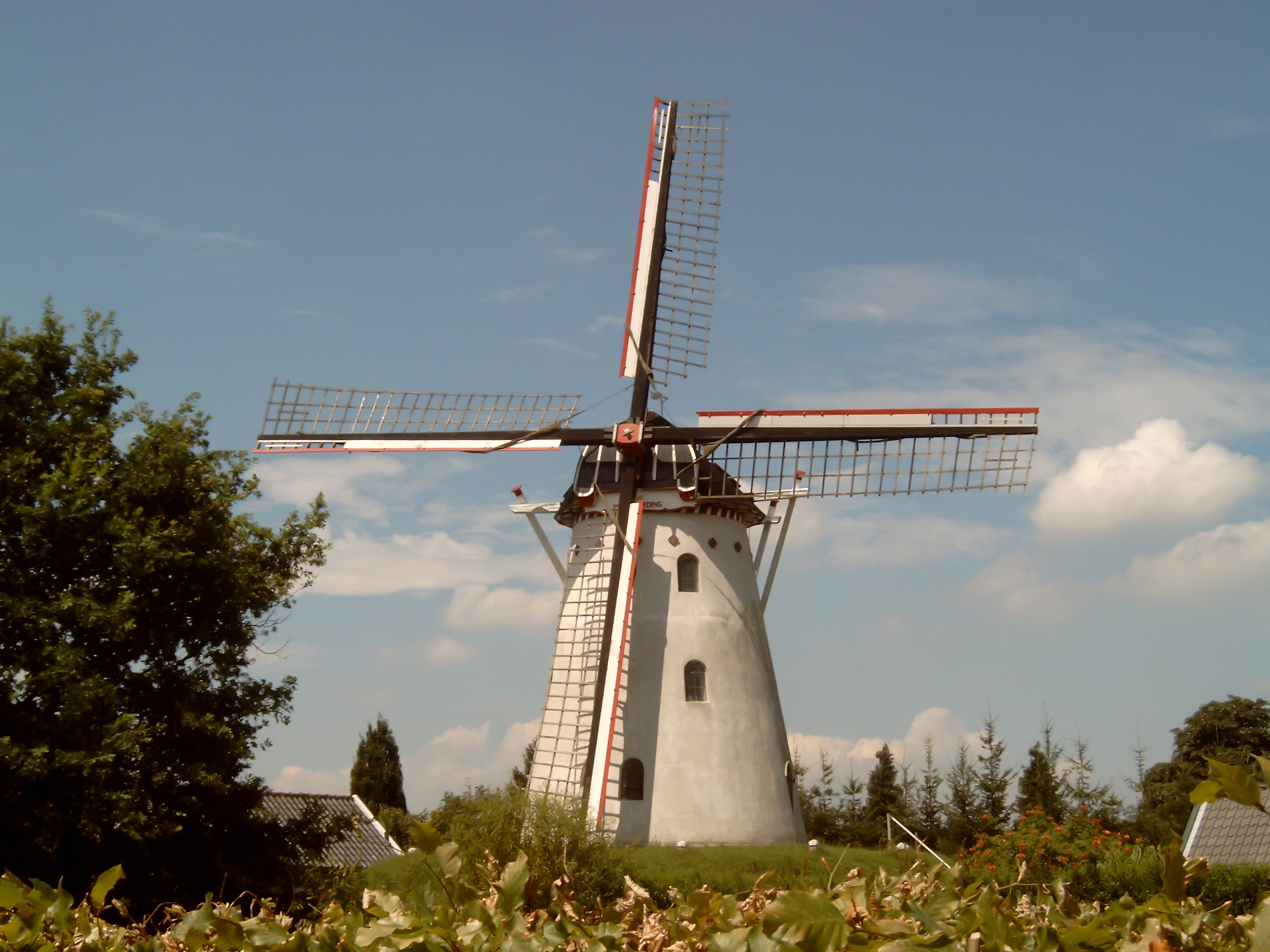
Windmill in Zeddam village

== Notable people ==
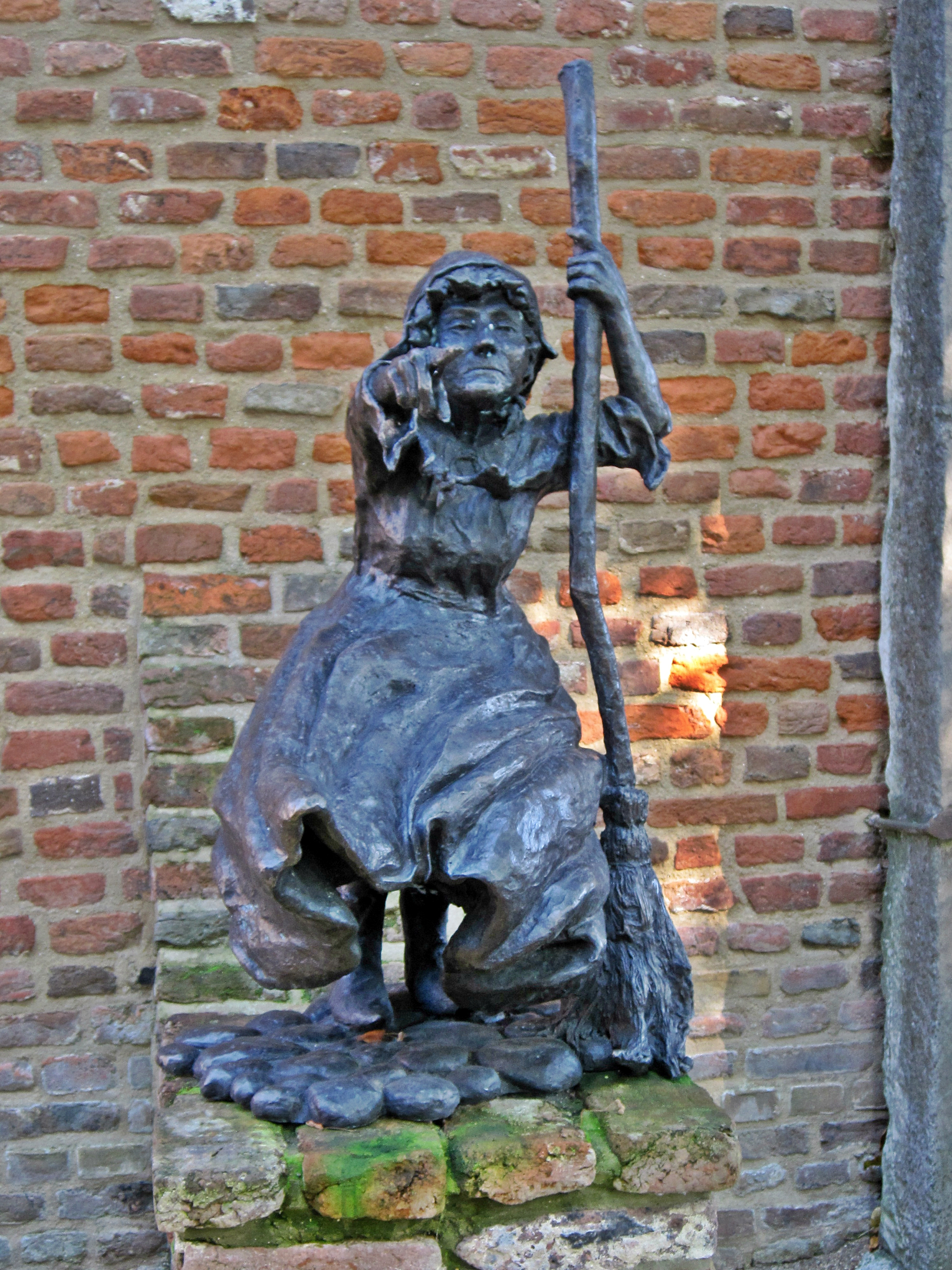
Sculpture of Mechteld ten Ham

- Willem IV van den Bergh (1537 in 's-Heerenberg – 1586) Stadtholder of Guelders and Zutphen
- Herman van den Bergh (1558 in 's-Heerenberg – 1611) a Dutch soldier in the Eighty Years' War
- Mechteld ten Ham (died 25 July 1605) an alleged Dutch witch in the city of 's-Heerenberg
- Everard Ter Laak (1868 in Didam - 1931) a Dutch Roman Catholic missionary in China
- Jozef Rulof (1898 in 's-Heerenberg – 1952) a Dutch author and psychic and trance medium or spirit medium
- Jos Som (born 1951 in Didam) a Dutch politician deputy Mayor of Didam
- Ernie Brandts (born 1956 in Nieuw-Dijk) a Dutch football manager and former player with 452 club caps
- Geert-Jan Derksen (born 1975 in Didam) a Dutch rower, silver medallist at the 2004 Summer Olympics
