= Nieuw-Dijk =

- Village
- Location in the Netherlands Nieuw-Dijk (Netherlands)
- Coordinates: 51°55′57″N 6°9′16″E
- Country: Netherlands
- Province: Gelderland
- Municipality: Montferland

Area
  - Total: 8.93 km^{2} (3.45 sq mi)
- Elevation: 12 m (39 ft)

Population (2021)
  - Total: 1,630
  - Density: 183/km^{2} (473/sq mi)
- Time zone: UTC+1 (CET)
  - Summer (DST): UTC+2 (CEST)
- Postal code: 6942
- Dialing code: 0316

Nieuw-Dijk is a village in the municipality of Montferland in the Dutch province of Gelderland, close to Germany, with a population of approximately 834 people.

Nieuw-Dijk has its own Roman Catholic parish church and primary school, both named for Saint Anthony of Padua.

In 1926 a local football club was established, called the Sprinkhanen ("Grasshoppers"). The village also has its own traditional shooting club (schutterij).

Activities for children are the Schuttersfeest and the Elfstratentocht, this is an inline skating route made by the village.

== Gallery ==
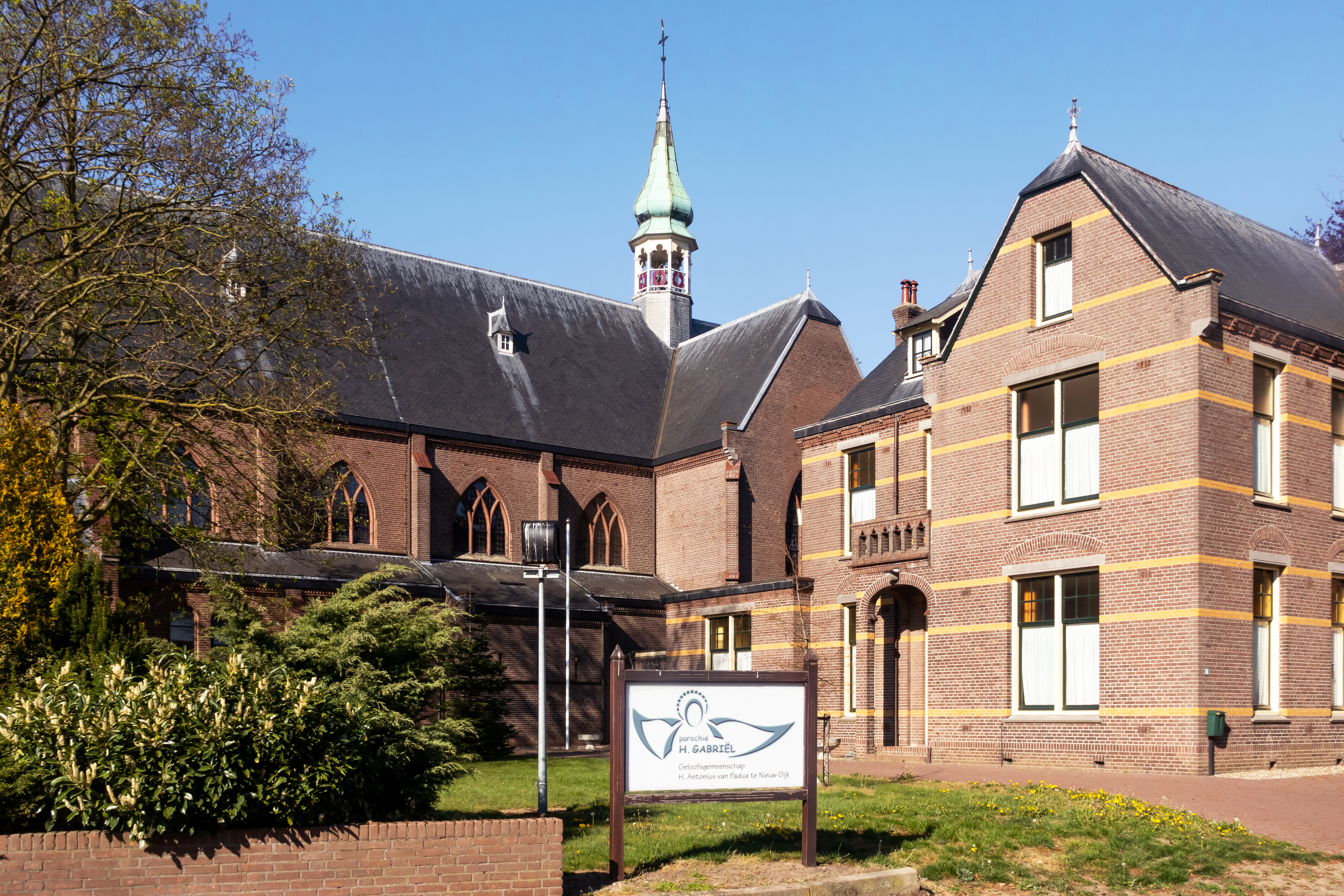
St. Antonius church

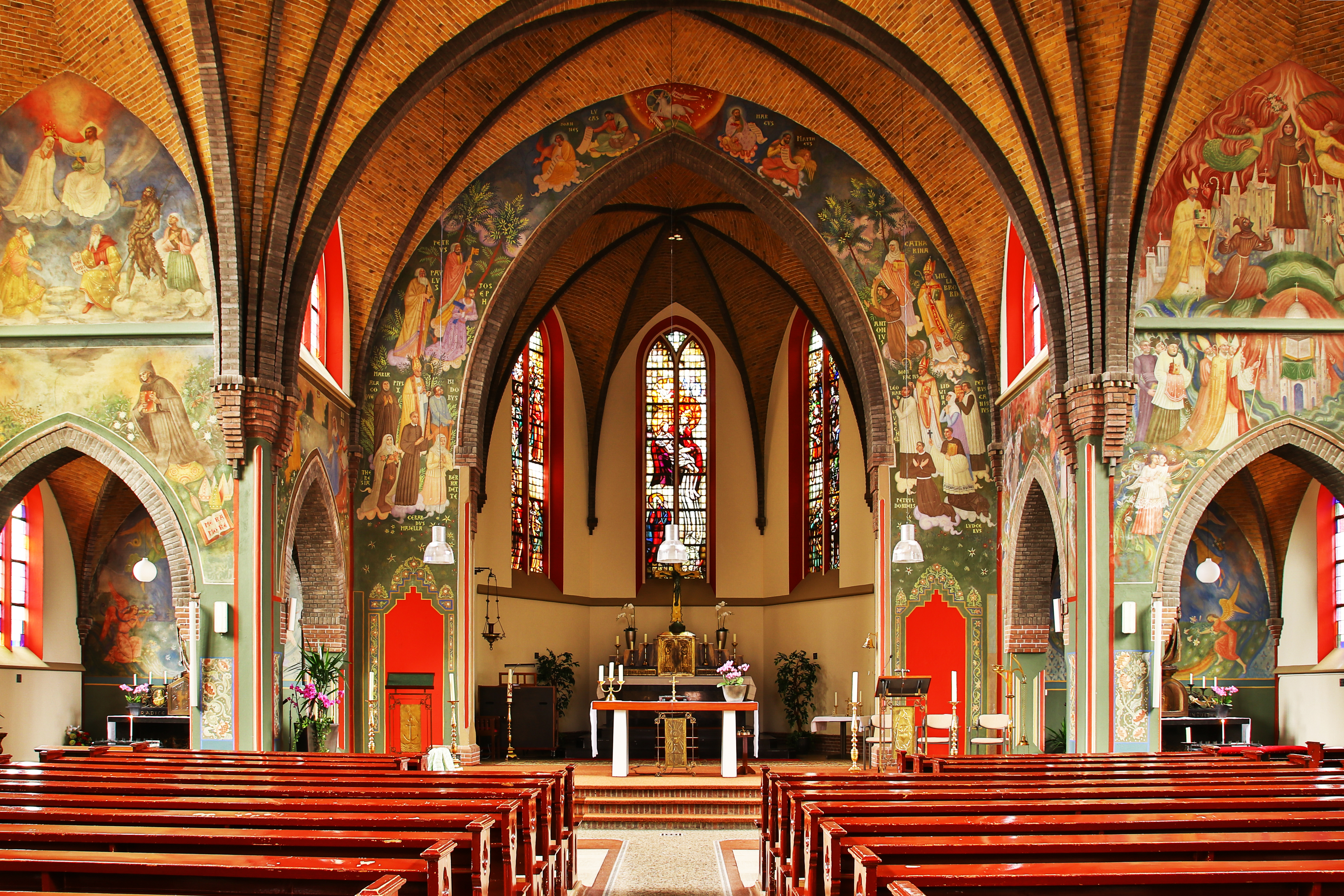
St. Antonius church, interior
