= Bergh =

Former municipality in Gelderland, the Netherlands

- former municipality
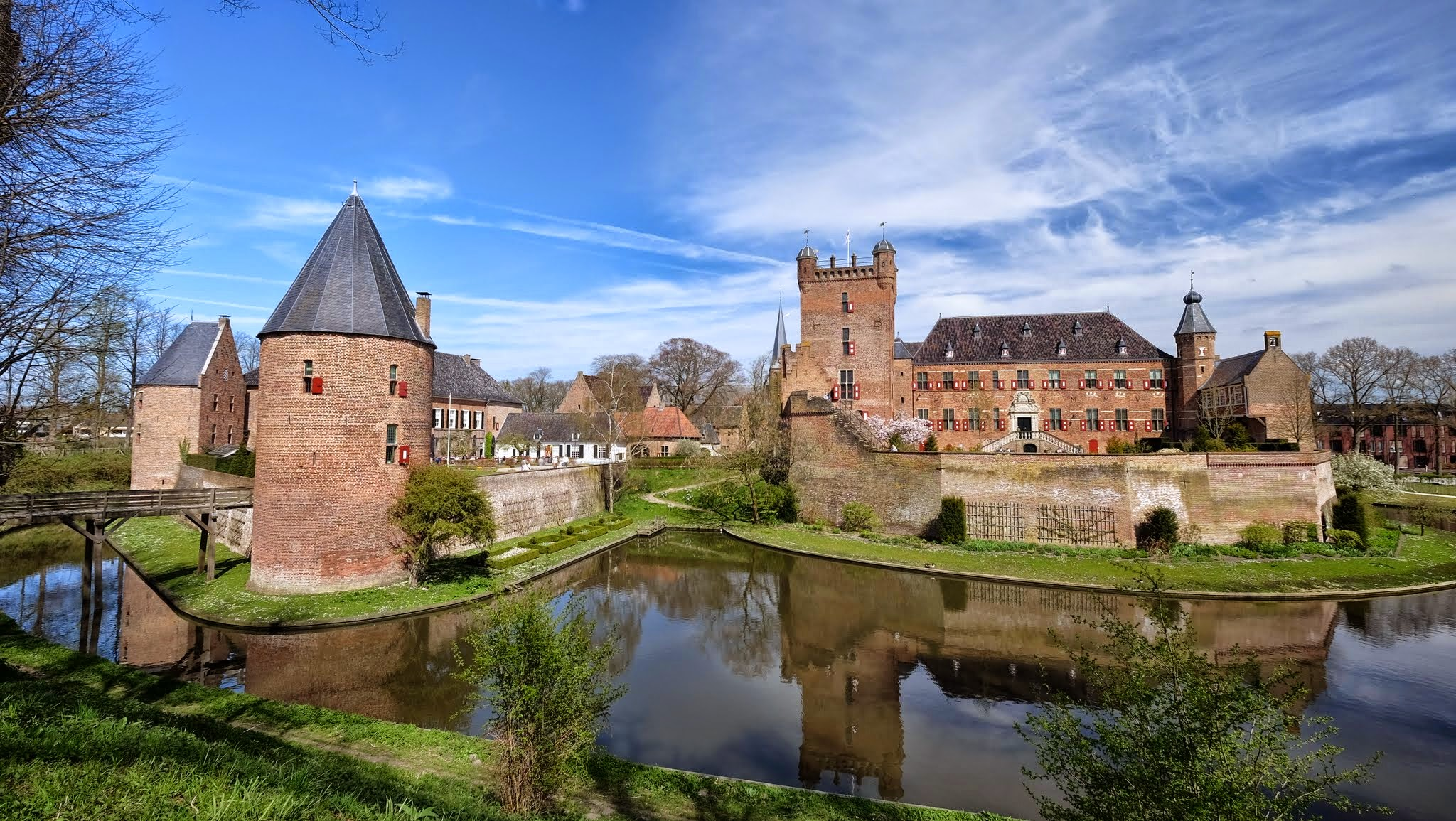
- Bergh skyline

- Flag Coat of arms

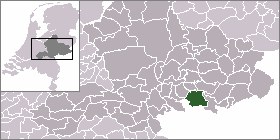
- Location of Bergh within Gelderland

- Former municipality of Bergh located within the province of Gelderland
- Coordinates: 51°53′N 6°15′E
- Country: Netherlands
- Province: Gelderland
- Established: 1821; 205 years ago
- Disestablished & merged: 2005; 21 years ago

Area
  - Total: 74.98 km^{2} (28.95 sq mi)
- Time zone: UTC+1 (CET)
  - Summer (DST): UTC+2 (CEST)
- Postcode: 10350
- Website: HeemkundekringBergh.nl

Bergh is a former municipality in the Dutch province of Gelderland. The municipality included the villages of 's-Heerenberg, Zeddam, and Stokkum.

In 2005, it merged with Didam to form the new municipality of Montferland.
