= Clemens Westerhof =

Dutch football manager (born 1940)

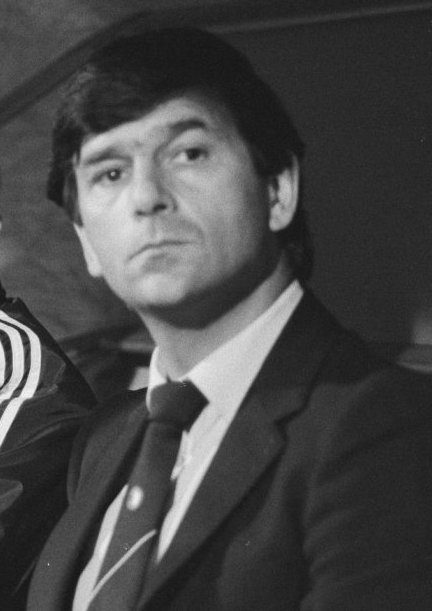

Personal information
- Date of birth: 3 May 1940 (age 86)
- Place of birth: Beek, Netherlands

Managerial career
- Years: Team
- 1976: Vitesse Arnhem
- 1980: Feyenoord
- 1983–1984: MVV
- 1984–1985: Vitesse Arnhem
- 1989–1994: Nigeria
- 1998–2000: Zimbabwe
- 2000: Mamelodi Sundowns
- 2001: Dynamos Harare
- 2004: Bush Bucks
Medal record
Men's football
Representing Nigeria (as manager)
Africa Cup of Nations
Runner-up	1990
Bronze medal – third place	1992
Winner	1994

Clemens Westerhof (born 3 May 1940) is a Dutch football manager, who has worked in various football positions on the African continent since 1989.

He is most noted for his success with the Nigerian national team. Under Westerhof, the Super Eagles won the 1994 African Cup of Nations and also qualified for the second round of the FIFA World Cup that year.

Westerhof began his career as an assistant coach in Feyenoord in the Dutch Eredivisie. He has also coached Vitesse Arnhem, the Zimbabwean national team, the Sporting Lions of Zimbabwe's Premier League, and the Bush Bucks and Mamelodi Sundowns of South Africa's Premier Soccer League. In addition, he has served as technical director of the Harare-based Agatha Sheneti Youth Academy and also of the Harare United club, which was linked to the academy. In 2001, he was technical director of Dynamos Harare, Zimbabwe's biggest club, but lasted in the position just a few months.

== Nigerian national team ==
In late 1989, Westerhof was signed by the Nigerian Football Association to coach the national team. After the team failed to qualify for the 1990 FIFA World Cup by failing to get at least a draw away to Cameroon on the last day of qualifying, Westerhof set about rebuilding the team. His effect was immediate, as Nigeria reached the final of the 1990 African Cup of Nations where they lost 1–0 to the host nation Algeria. In the lead-up to the 1992 African Cup of Nations, the Nigerian team which had adopted the nickname "Super Eagles" since losing controversially to Cameroon in the 1988 African Cup of Nations final match tried to justify the tag thanks to their recent winning run under Westerhof. They placed third at that tournament, losing to archrivals Ghana in the semi-final.

=== 1994 World Cup ===
In 1992, Nigeria began its quest to qualify for its first-ever FIFA World Cup, which would be held in the United States two years later. Placed in a group with South Africa and Congo, Nigeria finished top of its group in the first round, winning three games and drawing one, and did not concede a single goal in all four games. For the second and final round, Nigeria was grouped with Ivory Coast and Algeria. The Super Eagles won two games, drew one and lost one, and finished equal with Ivory Coast on points but advanced to the World Cup with a superior goal difference.

Nigeria entered the 1994 World Cup in Group D with Argentina, Bulgaria and Greece. Despite losing 2–1 to Argentina, wins over Bulgaria and Greece allowed the Super Eagles to do the unthinkable and finish top of the group, advancing to the second round.

Westerhof's side faced Italy in the second round. A first-half goal by Emmanuel Amuneke gave Nigeria a 1–0 lead at half-time, and they appeared to be heading for an upset win when Roberto Baggio scored to tie the game just two minutes from the final whistle. Baggio scored again from a penalty kick, 10 minutes into extra time, giving Italy a 2–1 win and knocking Nigeria out of the tournament.

Despite the defeat, the Super Eagles' World Cup campaign was considered a tremendous success, and Westerhof and the players were hailed as heroes on their return to Nigeria.

=== 1994 African Cup of Nations ===
Between the qualifying and the final round of the 1994 World Cup, Nigeria qualified for and competed in the 1994 African Cup of Nations in Tunisia. After finishing top of their qualifying group (which also featured Uganda, Sudan and Ethiopia), Nigeria advanced to the final round where they were placed in Group B with Egypt and Gabon. They drew with Egypt and beat Gabon to advance to the quarter-finals where they beat Zaire.

A penalty shootout win over Ivory Coast in the semi-finals set up a final match against Zambia, which they won 2–1. It was Nigeria's second African Cup of Nations championship, the first since 1980, and the first trophy in Westerhof's career as a manager.

=== Legacy ===
Westerhof is credited with turning Nigeria into a perennial powerhouse in African football and showing that they, and other African nations, can compete on the world stage. He is responsible for what could be described as a "golden" period in Nigerian football. Players such as Jay-Jay Okocha, Sunday Oliseh, Nwankwo Kanu, Rashidi Yekini, Daniel Amokachi and others, who all went on to successful careers with various high-profile European clubs, entered the world spotlight while playing under Westerhof.

== Controversy ==
=== Criticism from players ===
Following a 2–1 defeat by Italy at the 1994 FIFA World Cup which eliminated Nigeria from the tournament, striker Rashidi Yekini was critical of both Westerhof and his teammates, telling reporters:

"I have always been against this coach [Westerhof] ... It is no secret that I don't like him and he doesn't like me. I tried to go against him long ago, but my teammates did not support me. As a result, I was played out of the game. I never saw the ball."

Finidi George and Emmanuel Amuneke were two other Nigerian international players reported to have fallen out of favour with Westerhof; both players were dropped from the team by Westerhof at different points during his tenure as manager, only for the players to be subsequently reinstated in the team following the Nigerian Football Association's decision to overrule Westerhof.

=== South African Football Association ===
Westerhof sued the South African Football Association in 2000 over an alleged breach of contract, claiming they had picked him to coach that country's national team. He was eventually passed over for the position, however, and it was given to Carlos Queiroz. The dispute was settled out-of-court, with Westerhof receiving less than the originally reported R1 million (approx. US$150,000).

=== Divorce ===
Westerhof was married to Zimbabwean model Tendayi Westerhof (née Katekete); however, their marriage ended in a much-publicised divorce in 2002 in her home country that resulted in his being forced to leave to South Africa as his work permit had expired in Zimbabwe. She told the Financial Gazette newspaper that, "I have four children with three men... and not four" and that her ex-husband had not paid a "single cent" towards the support of their daughter, Aaliyah Nyashadzashe. Tendayi also went public with her HIV positive status, blaming Westerhof for it, allegations which he denied.

== Return to Nigeria ==
In 2005, as Nigeria's national team searched for a manager to help them qualify for the 2006 FIFA World Cup in Germany (a campaign which ultimately failed), Westerhof was named as one of the candidates for the job. He quickly ruled himself out of the race.

== Quotes ==
- "It's not the sex which tires out young players. It's the staying up all night looking for it."
