= 1579 =

1579 in various calendars
- Gregorian calendar: 1579; MDLXXIX
- Ab urbe condita: 2332
- Armenian calendar: 1028; ԹՎ ՌԻԸ
- Assyrian calendar: 6329
- Balinese saka calendar: 1500–1501
- Bengali calendar: 985–986
- Berber calendar: 2529
- English Regnal year: 21 Eliz. 1 – 22 Eliz. 1
- Buddhist calendar: 2123
- Burmese calendar: 941
- Byzantine calendar: 7087–7088
- Chinese calendar: 戊寅年 (Earth Tiger); 4276 or 4069 — to — 己卯年 (Earth Rabbit); 4277 or 4070
- Coptic calendar: 1295–1296
- Discordian calendar: 2745
- Ethiopian calendar: 1571–1572
- Hebrew calendar: 5339–5340
- Hindu calendars
- Vikram Samvat: 1635–1636
- Shaka Samvat: 1500–1501
- Kali Yuga: 4679–4680
- Holocene calendar: 11579
- Igbo calendar: 579–580
- Iranian calendar: 957–958
- Islamic calendar: 986–987
- Japanese calendar: Tenshō 7 (天正７年)
- Javanese calendar: 1498–1499
- Julian calendar: 1579; MDLXXIX
- Korean calendar: 3912
- Minguo calendar: 333 before ROC 民前333年
- Nanakshahi calendar: 111
- Thai solar calendar: 2121–2122
- Tibetan calendar: ས་ཕོ་སྟག་ལོ་ (male Earth-Tiger); 1705 or 1324 or 552 — to — ས་མོ་ཡོས་ལོ་ (female Earth-Hare); 1706 or 1325 or 553

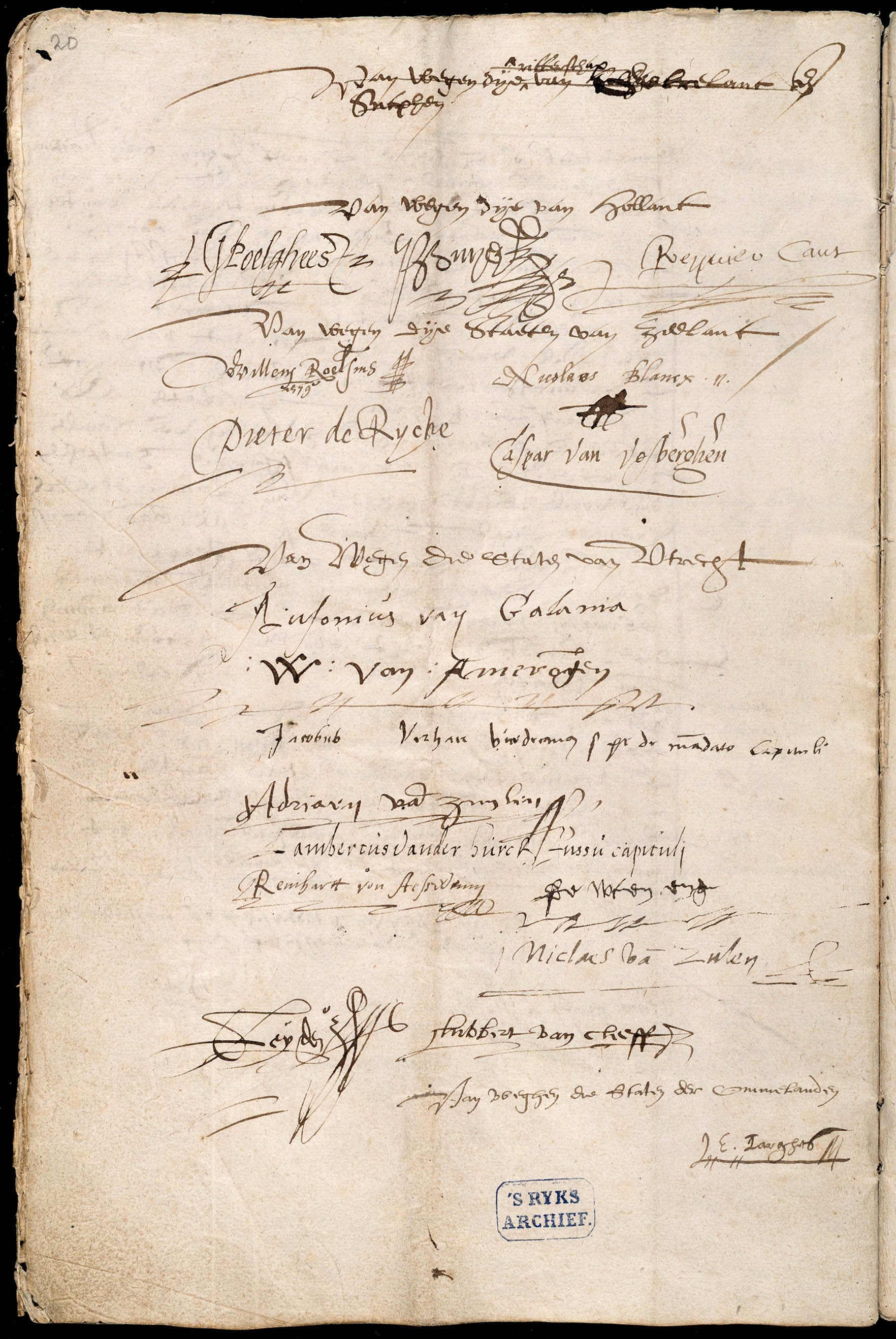
January 23: The Union of Utrecht is signed.

Year 1579 (MDLXXIX) was a common year starting on Thursday of the Julian calendar, and a common year starting on Monday of the Proleptic Gregorian calendar.

== Events ==
=== January–March ===
- January 6 – The Union of Arras unites the southern Netherlands under the Duke of Parma, governor in the name of king Philip II of Spain.
- January 23 – The Union of Utrecht unites the northern Netherlands in a confederation called the United Provinces. William the Silent becomes Stadtholder, and the Duc d'Anjou, younger brother of Henry III of France, is invited to become hereditary sovereign.
- February 4 – The Ghent Republic joins the Union of Utrecht.
- February 28 – The seizure in September by Willem IV van den Bergh, of the Boxmeer Castle in September in the Netherlands is condemned by the other Dutch members of the Union of Utrecht.
- March 1 – Off of the coast of what is now Ecuador, the English galleon Golden Hind, captained by Francis Drake, captures the Spanish freighter Nuestra Señora de la Concepción (unofficially called "Cagafuego") and its cargo, including 26 tons of silver and 1,000 pounds of gold.
- March 2 – Battle of Borgerhout in Brabant (now Belgium): Spanish troops under the command of the Duke of Parma overwhelm rebels fighting for the Union of Utrecht.
- March 12 – The Siege of Maastricht, a center of the Dutch resistance to Spanish rule, is started in the Netherlands by Spanish troops under the command of Alexander Farnese, Duke of Parma. The siege will last almost four months before Maastricht falls on July 1.

=== April–June ===
- April 10 – In the village of Cuers in France, near Toulon rebel peasants kill 600 nobles and upper-class gentlemen of the Catholic League serving the Count of Carces.
- May 17 – The Treaty of Arras is concluded between Spain (represented by the Duke of Parma), and members of the Union of Arras that had been formed in January. The Union of Utrecht continues its resistance against Spain while the County of Hainaut, the County of Artois, and the cities of Douai, Lille, Orchies and Arras agree to a separate peace under Spanish rule.
- May 21 – Battle of Mimaomote: In Japan, Doi Kiyonaga defeats the forces of Kumu Yorinobu.
- June 17 – Francis Drake, during his circumnavigation of the world, lands in modern-day California, which he claims for Queen Elizabeth I. With an English claim here and in Newfoundland, it becomes the basis for English colonial charters which will claim all land from the Atlantic to the Pacific, from "sea to sea." Drake's claim is called Nova Albion (New England), and subsequent maps will show all lands north of New Spain and New Mexico under this name.

=== July–September ===
- July 1 – Maastricht surrenders to Spanish troops after a surprise attack by the Duke of Parma, who had besieged the city for more than three months.
- July 13 – Karlovac in Croatia is founded.
- July 17 – James FitzMaurice FitzGerald lands with a small force of Irish, Spanish, and Italian troops at Smerwick, on the Dingle Peninsula in south-western Ireland, and commences the Second Desmond Rebellion against the rule in Ireland of Elizabeth I of England.
- August 6 – In the Spanish-controlled Netherlands, the representatives of the Union of Utrecht declare that they will no longer respect the authority of King Philip of Spain.
- August 17 – "Yasuke", a man of African origin who has been hired as a manager by the Chancellor of the Realm, Oda Nobunaga, arrives in Japan. Called "The Black Samurai" in dramatizations of his experience, he begins a service of three years to the Chancellor, ending on June 21, 1582.
- August 30 – Livonian War: In what is now Belarus, the city of Polotsk falls to the forces of Stephen Báthory, Grand Duke of Lithuania and King of Poland.
- September 10 – (5th waning of Tawthalin 941 ME) In the Kingdom of Mrauk U in what is now Myanmar and Bangladesh, King Min Phalaung becomes the owner of the first of three white elephants, and gives himself the title of Hsinbyushin.
- September 12 – Amendments are made to the May 17 Treaty of Arras, with further concessions to Spain by the Union of Arras. The final version is promulgated by King Philip of Spain in Mons, one of the regions in the Arras Union.
- September 28 – In Switzerland, a mutual assistance pact was signed at Lucerne between representatives of Roman Catholic cantons by the efforts of the Catholic Bishop of Basel, Jakob Christoph Blarer von Wartensee.

=== October–December ===
- October 5 – At Banda Aceh, on the island of Sumatra in what is now Indonesia, Alauddin Mansur Syah becomes the new Sultan of Aceh upon the death of Sultan Zainul Abidin.
- October 11 – Sokollu Mehmed Pasha, Grand Vizier of the Ottoman Empire for more than 14 years, is assassinated in Constantinople.
- October 13 – Semiz Ahmed Pasha is appointed as the new Ottoman Grand Vizier by Sultan Murad III.
- October 19 – King James VI of Scotland makes his ceremonial entry into Edinburgh to assume the throne at the age of 13, after being declared to have reached the age of majority. Scotland had been ruled by regents since 1567, when James was declared king.
- October 20 – Nicolò Doria is elected to a two-year term as the new Doge of the Republic of Genoa.

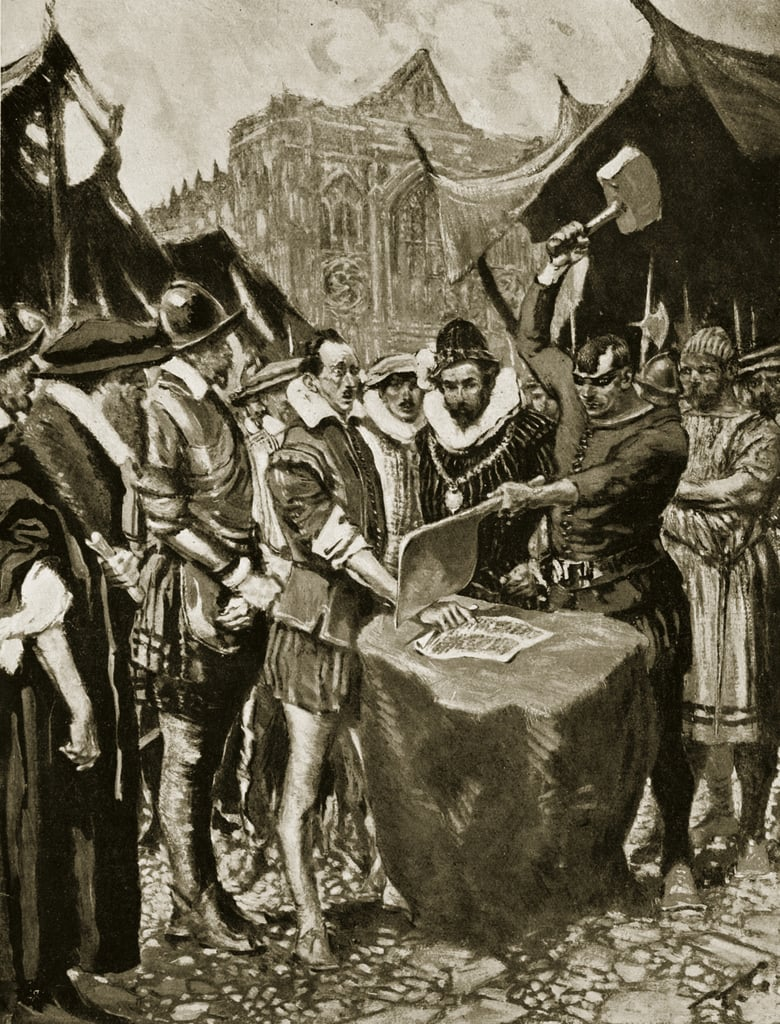
November 3: Seditious writer John Stubbs is barred from writing again

- November 3 – The English puritan John Stubbs, author of numerous pamphlets against the doctrines of the Church of England, is convicted of sedition, and his right hand is amputated as punishment.
- November 13 – During the Second Desmond Rebellion, rebel troops in Ireland, led by Gerald FitzGerald, 14th Earl of Desmond, carry out the Sack of Youghal and massacre the English Army garrison, then pillage and burn the homes of local residents.
- November 21 – Iancu Sasul becomes the new Prince of Moldavia as Peter the Lame steps down for the second time. Peter will replace Sasul on October 17, 1582.
- November 23 – Jeremias II Tranos is removed from office as Ecumenical Patriarch of Constantinople, leader of the Eastern Orthodox Church, and replaced by his rival Metrophanes III of Constantinople, whom he deposed on May 4, 1572.
- December 16 – After Willem van Pamele, the Spanish Governor of Flanders, is forced to flee during the Dutch Revolt, the Duke of Parma orders Pamele and the Catholic members of the Council of Flanders to convene at Douai as the temporary Flemish capital.
- December 24 – German astronomer Michael Maestlin makes the first cataloging of the Pleiades cluster, recording 11 separate stars visible to the naked eye, with a detailed illustration and measurements.
- December 25 – In France, Protestant French troops under the command of Matthieu Merle, make a surprise attack on the Roman Catholic cathedral in the village of Mende during Mass, and kill 400 civilians.

=== Date unknown ===
- In the Mughal Empire in India, Akbar abolishes the jizya, the tax placed upon non-Muslim residents.
- Akbar issues a mazhar signed by the leading ulamas, putting himself as the highest religious authority, allowing him to interpret the Quran.
- The municipality of Boac in Marinduque, Philippines is founded.
- The Bible of Kralice begins publication. The first complete translation of the Bible into the Czech language (with notes), it is prepared by the Unity of the Brethren, and published at Kralice nad Oslavou, Bohemia.

== Births ==
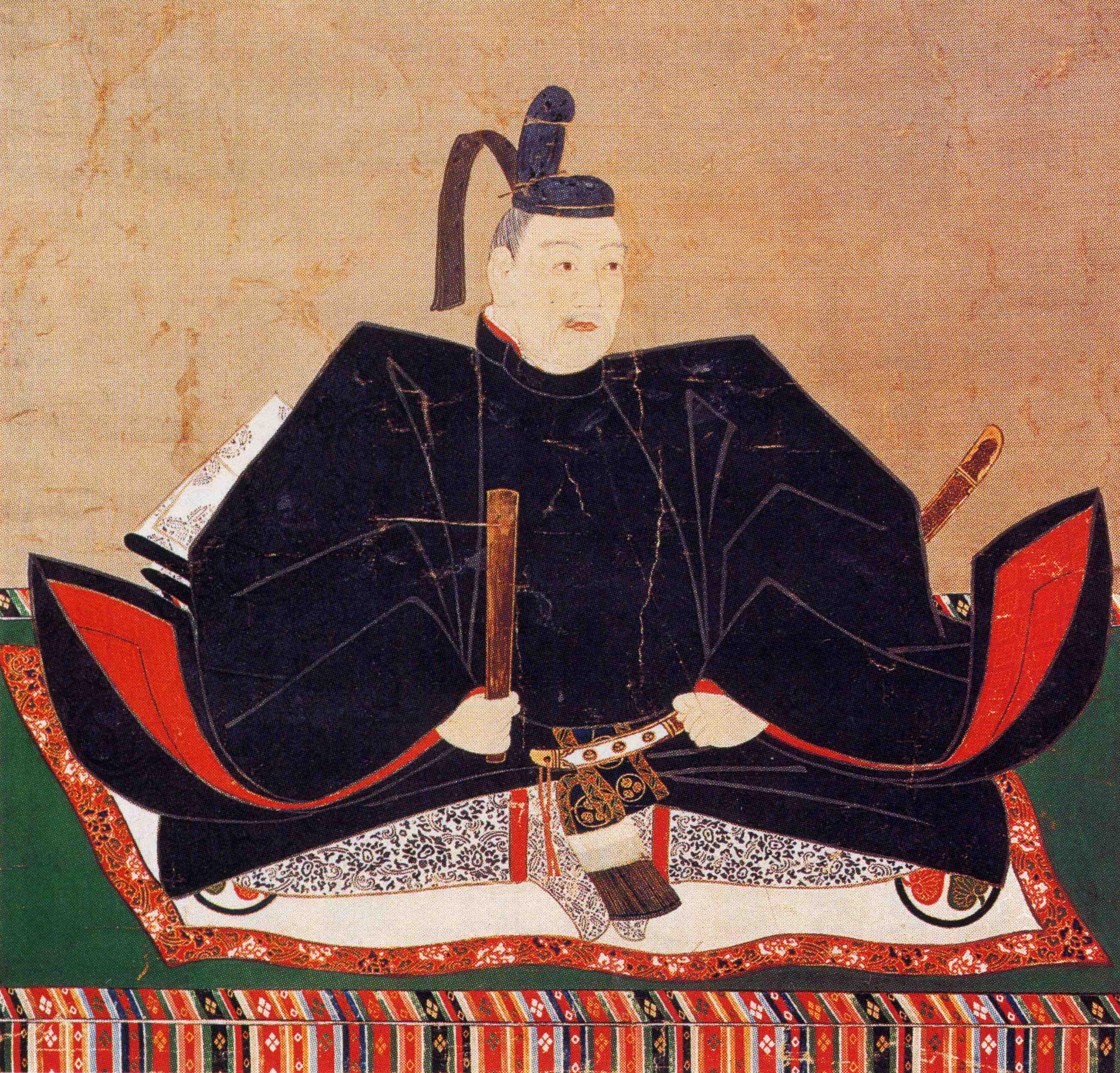
Tokugawa Hidetada

- January 4 – Willem Teellinck, Dutch pastor (d. 1629)
- January 6 – Juan Manuel Pérez de Guzmán, 8th Duke of Medina Sidonia, Spanish nobleman, Knight of the Order of the Golden Fleece (d. 1636)
- January 23 – Marie of Prussia, Margravine of Brandenburg-Bayreuth (d. 1649)
- January 27 – Antonio Tornielli, Italian Catholic prelate who served as Bishop of Novara (1636–1650) (d. 1650)
- February 24 – Johann Jacob Grasser, Swiss poet, historian and theologian (d. 1627)
- March 23 – Francis Mansell, English academic (d. 1665)
- April 10 – Augustus the Younger, Duke of Brunswick-Lüneburg (d. 1666)
- April 12 – François de Bassompierre, French courtier (d. 1646)
- May 1 – Wolphert Gerretse, Dutch founder of the New Netherland Colony (d. 1662)
- May 2 – Tokugawa Hidetada, Japanese shōgun (d. 1632)
- June 17 – Louis I of Anhalt-Köthen, German prince (d. 1650)
- June 18 – Afonso Mendes, Patriarch of Ethiopia (d. 1659)
- July 2 – Janusz Radziwiłł, Lithuanian and Polish nobleman (d. 1620)
- July 6
  - Bernardino de Almansa Carrión, Spanish Catholic prelate and Archbishop (d. 1633)
  - Francis Norris, 1st Earl of Berkshire, English noble (d. 1622)
- July 13 – Arthur Dee, English physician and alchemist (d. 1651)
- August 1 – Luis Vélez de Guevara, Spanish dramatist and novelist (d. 1644)
- August 18 – Countess Charlotte Flandrina of Nassau, Dutch-French abbess (d. 1640)
- August 21 – Henri, Duke of Rohan, French Huguenot soldier and writer (d. 1638)
- August 23 – Thomas Dempster, Scottish scholar and historian (d. 1625)
- September 1 – John Frederick of Holstein-Gottorp, Prince-Bishop, German Catholic archbishop (d. 1634)
- September 3 – Louis I, Count of Erbach-Erbach (1606–1643) (d. 1643)
- September 16 – Samuel Coster, Dutch writer (d. 1665)
- September 17 – Charles Howard, 2nd Earl of Nottingham, English noble (d. 1642)
- October 4 – Guido Bentivoglio, Italian cardinal (d. 1644)
- October 18 – Anthony Abdy, English merchant (d. 1640)
- November 7 – Juan de Peñalosa, Spanish painter (d. 1633)
- November 11 – Frans Snyders, Flemish painter (d. 1657)
- November 12 – Albrecht of Hanau-Münzenberg, German nobleman (d. 1635)
- November 16 – Federico Baldissera Bartolomeo Cornaro, Italian Catholic cardinal (d. 1653)
- December 9 – Martin de Porres, Peruvian monk, Roman Catholic saint (d. 1639)
- December 20 (bapt.) – John Fletcher, English dramatist (d. 1625)
- date unknown
  - Jacob Astley, 1st Baron Astley of Reading, royalist commander in the English Civil War (d. 1652)
  - Arthur Johnston, Scottish physician and poet (d. 1641)
  - John Ogilvie, Scottish Jesuit, Roman Catholic saint (martyred 1615)
  - Johannes Meursius, Dutch classical scholar and antiquary (d. 1639)

== Deaths ==
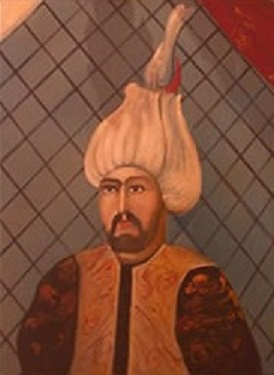
Sokollu Mehmed Pasha

- February 5 – Countess Palatine Helena of Simmern, Countess consort of Hanau-Münzenberg (1551–1561) (b. 1532)
- February 16 – Gonzalo Jiménez de Quesada, Spanish explorer (b. 1509)
- February 20 – Nicholas Bacon, English politician (b. 1509)
- March 12 – Alessandro Piccolomini, Italian humanist and philosopher from Siena (b. 1508)
- April 24 – John Stuart, 4th Earl of Atholl
- May 6 – François de Montmorency, 2nd Duke of Montmorency, French nobleman (b. 1530)
- May 20 – Isabella Markham, English courtier (b. 1527)
- June 17 – Johannes Stadius, Flemish astronomer, astrologer, mathematician (b. 1527)
- June 25 – Hatano Hideharu, Japanese samurai (b. 1541)
- July 3 – Edward Fitton, the elder, Irish politician (b. 1527)
- August 5 – Stanislaus Hosius, Polish Catholic cardinal (b. 1504)
- August 12 – Domenico Bollani, Bishop of Milan (b. 1514)
- October 11 – Sokollu Mehmed Pasha, Turkish Janissary and Grand Vizier (b. 1505)
- October 13 – William Drury, English politician (b. 1527)
- October 21 – Tanegashima Tokitaka, Japanese Daimyo (b. 1528)
- October 24 – Albert V of Bavaria (b. 1528)
- November 9 – Philip VI, Count of Waldeck (1567–1579) (b. 1551)
- November 15 – Francis David, Hungarian religious reformer (b. 1510)
- November 21 – Thomas Gresham, English merchant and financier (b. 1519)
- date unknown
  - Giovanni Battista Adriani, Italian historian (b. c. 1512)
  - Diego de Landa, Spanish Bishop of the Yucatán (b. 1524)
  - Hieronim Jarosz Sieniawski, Polish noble (b. 1516)
  - Barbara Thenn, Austrian merchant and Münzmeister (b. 1519)
  - William Whittingham, English Biblical scholar and religious reformer (b. 1524)
  - Voravongsa I, Laotian king of Lan Xang
- probable – Hans Staden, German adventurer (b. 1525)
