= Maria Van den Bergh =

Dutch noblewoman

Marchioness Maria Elisabeth Van den Bergh Princess of Hohenzollern-Hechingen
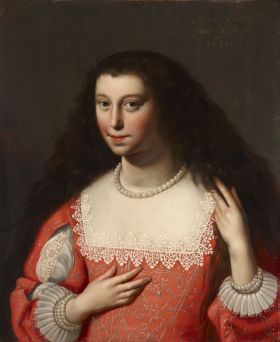
- Maria Elisabeth in about 1629

Marchioness of Bergen op Zoom
- In office 1635–1658 – 1659–1671
- Preceded by: Maria Elisabeth I, Marchioness of Bergen op Zoom
- Succeeded by: Henriëtte Francisca, Princess of Hohenzollern-Hechingen

Princess of Hohenzollern-Hechingen
- In office 1630–1671
- Preceded by: Francisca I, Princess of Hohenzollern-Hechingen
- Succeeded by: Henriëtte Francisca, Princess of Hohenzollern-Hechingen

Baroness of Breda
- In office 1627–1671
- Preceded by: Margaretha Von Wittem
- Succeeded by: Henriëtte Francisca, Princess of Hohenzollern-Hechingen

Personal details
- Born: January 1613 Stevensweert, Limburg, Netherlands
- Died: 29 November 1671 (58) Bergen Op Zoom, Noord-Brabant, Netherlands
- Spouse: Eitel Frederick II, Prince of Hohenzollern-Hechingen
- Children: 1. Stillborn Son 2. Henriette Francisca
- Parent(s): Hendrik van den Bergh (count) and Margaretha Von Wittem
- Nickname: Miss Lieske

Maria Elisabeth Van den Bergh, Princess of Hohenzollern-Hechingen (January 1613 – 29 November 1671) was a Dutch noblewoman and daughter of Hendrik van den Bergh. She lived at the court of Elizabeth Stuart, Queen of Bohemia around the year 1628.

== Early life ==
She was born on January 1613 in Stevensweert. She spent part of her youth in Brussels at the court of Isabella Clara Eugenia, the strict Catholic governor of the Southern Netherlands. However, his also came into Northern Dutch court circles. In The Hague she was friends with Amalia of Solms-Braunfels, the wife of Stadtholder Frederik Hendrik van Oranje-Nassau, who was a cousin of her father. Amalia had come to The Hague as lady-in-waiting to Winter Queen Elisabeth Stuart.

== Marriage ==
Maria Elisabeth married Eitel Frederick II, Prince of Hohenzollern-Hechingen on March 19, 1630. The marriage was solemnized at Boutersem Castle near Leuven, which belonged to her mother's family. Her husband was born in Hechingen in January 1601 as the son of Johan Georg van Hohenzollern-Hechingen and Francisca van Salm-Finstingen. In 1623 he succeeded his father as reigning monarch and remained so until his death in 1661 .

From her marriage she derived the title of Princess of Hohenzollern-Hechingen, but as far as can be ascertained she was never there. Even after her marriage she has always lived on her possessions in the Northern and Southern Netherlands. She derived the right to do so from the marriage contract that had been concluded after two years of negotiations. It was explicitly stipulated that she could always travel unimpeded from Hechingen to the Netherlands. In practice, it seems that she has never even been there. In any case, her family thought that Hechingen in southern Germany was very far away, and the couple therefore married outside community of property. She had been separated from her husband since 1635 .

The House of Hohenzollern-Hechingen (extinct 1869) was closely related to the House of Hohenzollern-Sigmaringen, which came into possession of the County of Bergh by inheritance in 1787. However, Maria Elisabeth's marriage to a prince of Hohenzollern-Hechingen played no part in this.

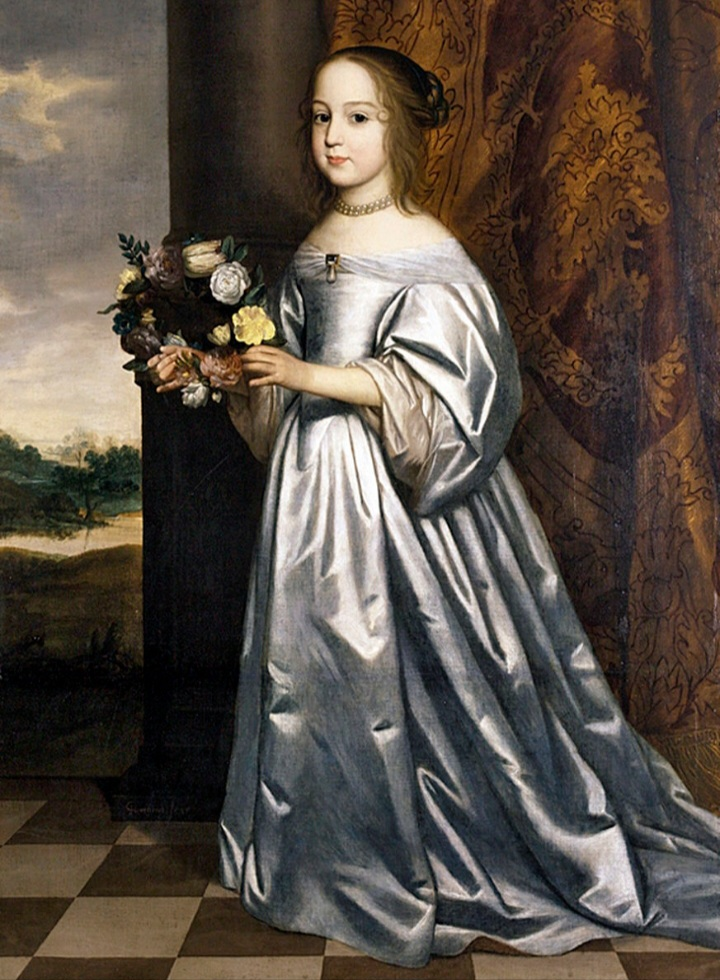
Henriette Francisca, Princess of Hohenzollern-Hechingen (Maria Elisabeth's daughter)

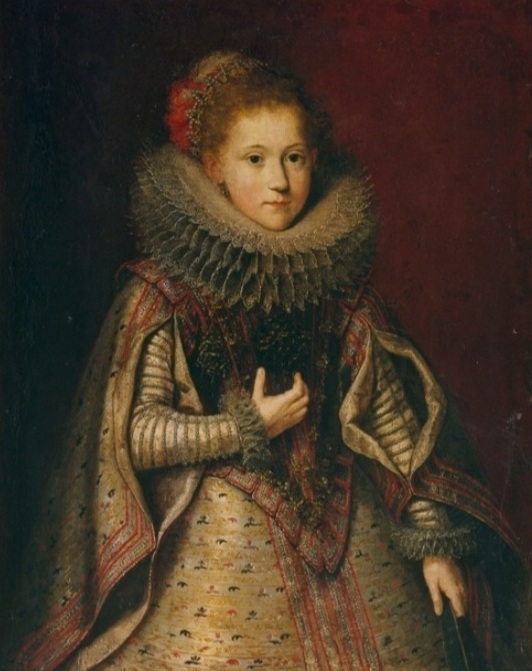
Maria Elisabeth's Cousin and near namesake, Maria Elisabeth Clara Van den Bergh.

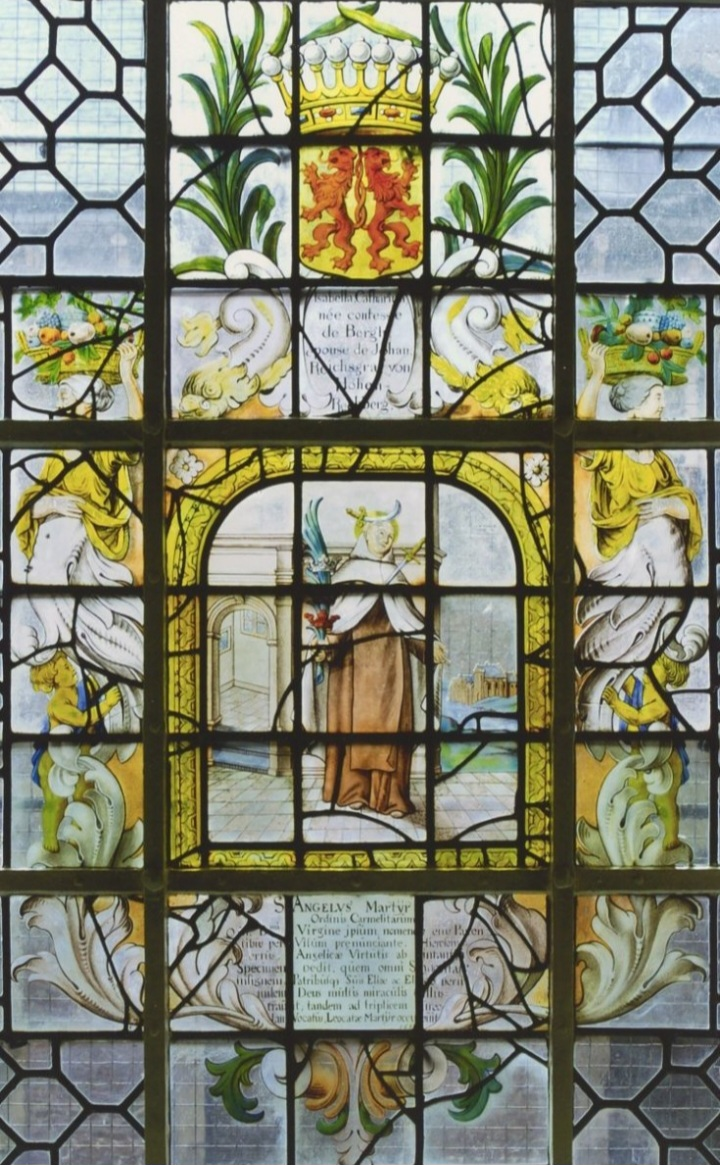
Her stained glass window

== Stained glass window ==
In 1684, Maria Elisabeth donated one of the stained glass windows in the Carmelite convent in Boxmeer. She may have done this at the request of her cousin Oswald III Van den Bergh, who had been lord of Boxmeer since the death of his father, the founder of the monastery. It seems that Count Oswald had asked his family for more windows, because also dating from 1684, apart from his own window and that of Maria Elisabeth, are those donated by Maria Clara Van den Bergh and her husband Maximiliaan van Hohenzollern-Sigmaringen, by Elisabeth Catharina van den Bergh, and by Herman Frederik van den Bergh – and possibly one or more of the undated windows.

Maria Elisabeth's window is dedicated to Saint Serapion of Thmuis, a fourth-century Egyptian hermit. He is depicted in a Carmelite habit. The mitre next to him refers to his appointment as bishop of Antioch.

The coat of arms at the top of the window is a combination of the Hohenzollern and van den Bergh coats of arms. The same combination can also be seen on the gable stone of the Kaarschotse mill.

The crown above the coat of arms is a Fürstenhut, which in Imperial Germany symbolized a monarch in the sense of head of state of a principality. Her husband was Prince of Hohenzollern-Hechingen, making the title of Princess her highest title of nobility. In the French text below the coat of arms, this dignity is mentioned first, with the title queen translated as princesse. The text:

Elizabeth, par la grace de Dieu Princesse de Zollern, née Comtesse Bergh, Marquise de Berghes sur le Zoom, Baronne de Hedel, Dame de Gestel, S. Michiel, Outherlaer, Borghuliet, Spalbeeck, Braine Laleud, Opvelp, Muijlsteden, Beersele, Baronne hereditary de la Duché de Gueldres et Comté de Zutphen, etc. 1684.

== Portrait ==
In 1628, the adjacent oil portrait of Maria Elisabeth was painted. It is part of a series of six panels with portraits of noble ladies, including her friend Elizabeth Stuart, Queen of Bohemia. It is not known by whom or why the portraits were made, but it is striking that the six ladies are all depicted with loose hair. That was a sign of loose morals and therefore inappropriate for noble ladies. The portraits are now part of the collection of the Markiezenhof Historisch Centrum in Bergen op Zoom.

== Ancestry ==
8. Oswald II Van den Bergh
4. Willem IV van den Bergh
9. Elisabeth Von Dorth
2. Hendrik Van den Bergh
10. William of Nassau-Siegen
5. Maria of Nassau
11. Juliana of Stolberg
1. Maria Elisabeth Van den Bergh
12. Maximiliaan de Witten
6. Johan IV de Witten
13. Gillette de Halewyn
3. Margaretha Von/de Wittem
14. Johann IX de Mérode
7. Marie Marguerite de Mérode
15. Mencia de Glymes
