= Johann Georg, Prince of Hohenzollern-Hechingen =

First Prince of Hohenzollern-Hechingen (1577–1623)

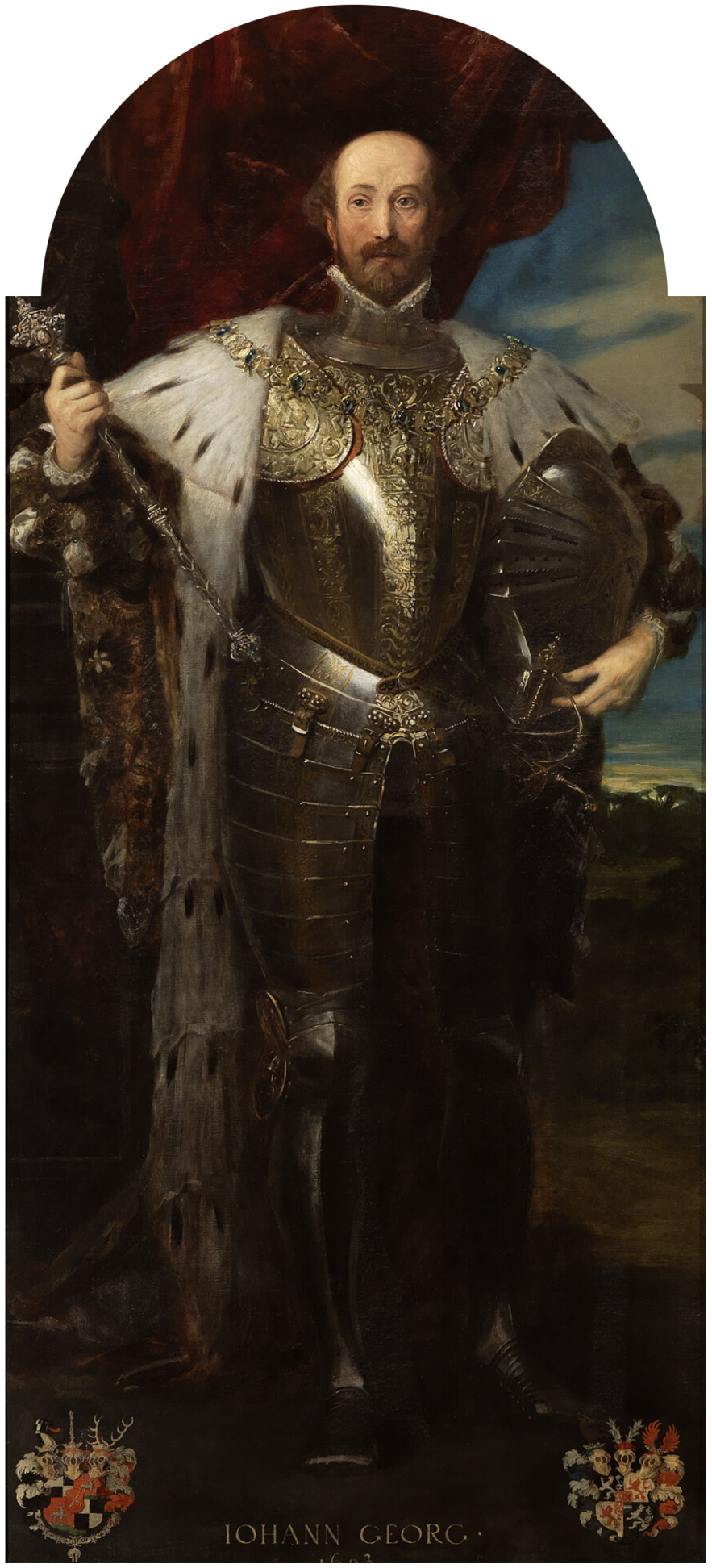
- Portrait of Johann Georg of Hohenzollern-Hechingen by Gustav Klimt at Peleș Castle
- Born: 1577; Hechingen
- Died: 28 September 1623; Hechingen
- Noble family: House of Hohenzollern
- Spouse: Franziska of Salm-Neufville
- Father: Eitel Friedrich IV, Count of Hohenzollern
- Mother: Sibylle of Zimmern

Johann Georg of Hohenzollern-Hechingen (born 1577 in Hechingen; died 28 September 1623 in Hechingen) was the first Prince of Hohenzollern-Hechingen.

== Early life ==
Johann Georg was the only surviving son of Count Eitel Friedrich IV of Hohenzollern-Hechingen (1545–1605) from his second marriage with Countess Sibylle von Zimmern (1558–1599), daughter of Count Froben Christoph of Zimmern. Johann Georg was raised by his relatives in Berlin at the court of Brandenburg.

== Biography ==
Johann Georg was a Catholic and loyal to the Emperor's side. From 1603 to 1605, he was president of the Reichskammergericht and later he was president of the Aulic Council. The latter post proved helpful when during a military confrontation with Georg Dietrich of Westerstetten, Johann Georg's army had inadvertently strayed into Württemberg territory.

He represented Austria at the Imperial Diet. Together with Johann Pistorius, the tried, in vain, to persuade margrave Georg Friedrich of Baden-Durlach to revert to Catholicism. In 1609, the emperor sent him as a special envoy to the French court. On his return, he met Archduke Albrecht VII in Brussels. He would correspond with the Archduke ever after.

Because of the low pay and several disputes with Melchior Klesl, he tried to resign three times in 1612 and 1613. The Emperor, however, did not accept his resignation. In 1614, he was again sent on a successful mission to France.

In 1620, Emperor Ferdinand II made Johann Georg a Knight of the Order of the Golden Fleece and in on 23 March 1623, he was made an Imperial Prince, together with 22 other imperial counts, including the counts of Hohenzollern-Sigmaringen and Hohenzollern-Haigerloch. With this elevation, Ferdinand attempted to restore the balance between Catholic and Protestant princes.

Johann Georg was described as a talented and scientifically formed. In 1623, he added bastions to his hohenzollern Castle.

== Marriage and issue ==
Johann Georg married on 11 October 1598 in the Friedrichsburg in Hechingen with Countess Franziska von Salm-Neufville (d. 1619), daughter of Wild- and Rhinegrave Friedrich I of Salm-Neufville (1547–1608) and his wife, Countess Franziska von Salm (d. 1587). They had the following children:

- Karl (1599–1599)
- Sibyl (died 1621)

married in 1615 Ernst of Marck, Count of Schleiden (1590–1654)

- Franziska Katharina (died 1665)

married in 1619 Count Jakob Hannibal II of Hohenems (1595–1646)

- Eitel Friedrich V (1601–1661), married in 1630 Countess Elisabeth van den Bergh, Marchioness and heiress of Bergen op Zoom (1613–1671), daughter of Count Hendrik van den Bergh.
- Johann Friedrich (* / † 1602)
- Anna Maria (1603–1652)

married Landgrave Egon VIII of Fürstenberg-Heiligenberg (1588–1635)

- Georg Friedrich (died 1633), fell in battle
- Marie Domina (died young)
- Katharina Ursula (died 1640)

married in 1624 Margrave William von Baden-Baden (1593–1677)

- Renate Marie (died 1637)

married in 1625 with Count Hugo of Königsegg-Rothenfels (1595–1666)

- Maximiliane (died 1639)

married in 1630 with Count Johann Franz Trautson of Falkenstein (1609–1663)

- Leopold Friedrich (died 1659), a canon at Cologne
- Anna Maria (1614–1670)

married in 1630 Count Ernst of Isenburg-Grenzau (1584–1664)

- Philipp, Prince of Hohenzollern-Hechingen (1616–1671)

married in 1662 with Margravine Marie Sidonie of Baden-Rodemachern (1635–1686)

== Footnotes ==
Johann Georg, Prince of Hohenzollern-Hechingen House of Hohenzollern Born: 1577 Died: 28 September 1623
Preceded by Eitel Friedrich IV	Count of Hohenzollern-Hechingen; 1605–1623	Succeeded by Eitel Friedrich V
