= Maria of Nassau (1539–1599) =

Countess Maria Von Nassau-Dillenburg Duchess of Boxmeer
- Born: 15 March 1539; Dillenburg, County of Nassau, German Empire
- Died: 28 March 1599 (60); Ulft, Gelderland, Netherlands
- Other names: Maria Van Nassau-Dillenburg
- Spouse: Willem IV van den bergh (m. 1556-1586, his death)
- Children: 16
- Parents: Willem I, Count of Nassau-Dillenburg (father); Juliana, Countess of Stolberg-Wernigerode (mother)
- Relatives: William the Silent (brother)

Maria Von Nassau-Dillenburg (18 March 1539, in Dillenburg – 28 May 1599, in Kasteel Ulft), Countess of Nassau, Katzenelnbogen, Vianden and Dietz, was a Dutch noblewoman.

== Life ==
She was the second daughter of William I, Count of Nassau-Siegen and Juliana of Stolberg, making Maria a sister of William the Silent. On 11 November 1556 she married Count Willem IV van den Bergh (1537–1586) in Meurs. They resided in Huis Bergh Castle until they fled for Cologne and then later Bremen. Count Willem committed treason against his brother-in-law William by defecting to the Spanish. He and Maria were caught, but were quickly freed on William's intervention.

Maria was initially buried at Huis Bergh Castle with her husband, however her remains were later moved to a church in Gendringen. They were later lost in a fire.

It is believed that there are no portraits of Maria, only a statue at Huis Bergh Castle.

== Issue ==
Maria and Willem IV van den Bergh had 16 children:

- Magdalena van den Bergh-'s Heerenberg (1 Aug. 1557 - 25 May 1579)
- Herman van den Bergh Count van den Bergh-'s Heerenberg ( 2 Aug. 1558 - 12 Aug. 1611)
- Frederik van den Bergh Count den Bergh-'s Heerenberg (18 Aug. 1559 - 3 Sep. 1618)
- Oswald van den Bergh (16 Jun. 1561 - 17 Jan. 1586)
- Wilhelmina van den Bergh-'s Heerenberg (7 Jul. 1562 - drowned in the IJssel near Ulft, 15 Nov. 1591)
- Elisabeth van den Bergh-'s Heerenberg (31 Dec. 1563 - 1572)
- Joost van den Bergh Count van den Bergh-'s Heerenberg (25 jan. 1565 - 8 Aug. 1600)
- Adam van den Bergh Count van den Bergh-'s Heerenberg (1568 - 7 Nov. 1590)
- Juliana van den Bergh-'s Heerenberg (1571 - drowned in the IJssel near Ulft, 15 Nov. 1591)
- Adolf van den Bergh Count van den Bergh-'s Heerenberg (1572 - 25 May 1609)
- Lodewijk van den Bergh Count van den Bergh-'s Heerenberg (1 Nov. 1572 - 10 .Jun 1592)
- Hendrik van den Bergh Count van den Bergh-'s Heerenberg, Lord of Stevensweerd en Stadhouder of Gelre (1573 - 12 May 1638)
- Catharina van den Bergh-'s Heerenberg (1578 - 19 Oct. 1640). She married Floris II of Pallandt 2nd Count of Culemborg (1601)
- Anna van den Bergh-'s Heerenberg (1579 - 17 Aug 1630)
- Elisabeth van den Bergh-'s Heerenberg princess-abdes of Essen (1581 - 12 Jan 1614)
- Charlotte van den Bergh-'s Heerenberg (1582 - 2 Nov 1631)
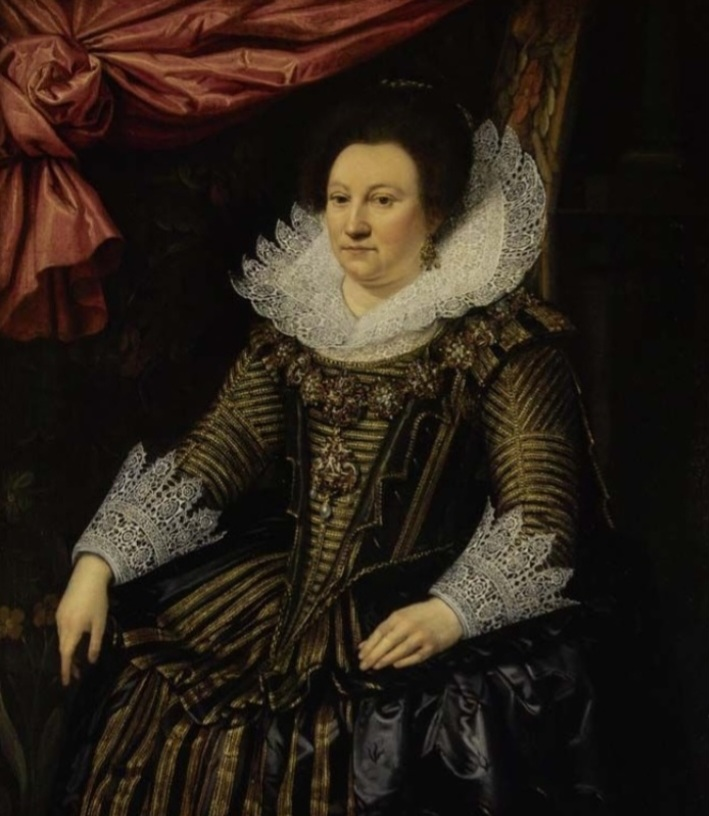
  Catharina Van den Bergh, Maria's 13th child.
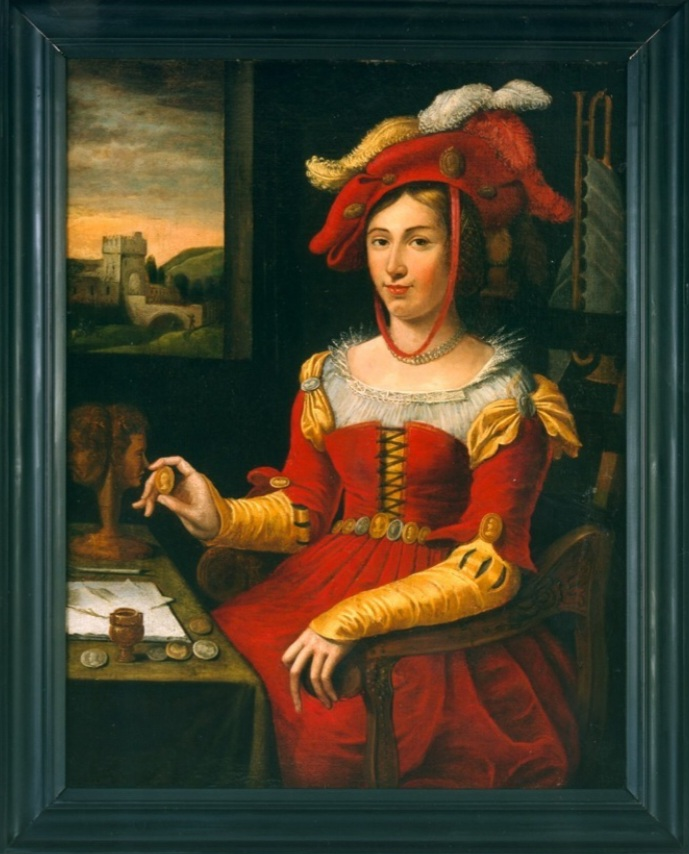
  Anna Van den Bergh, Maria's 14th child.
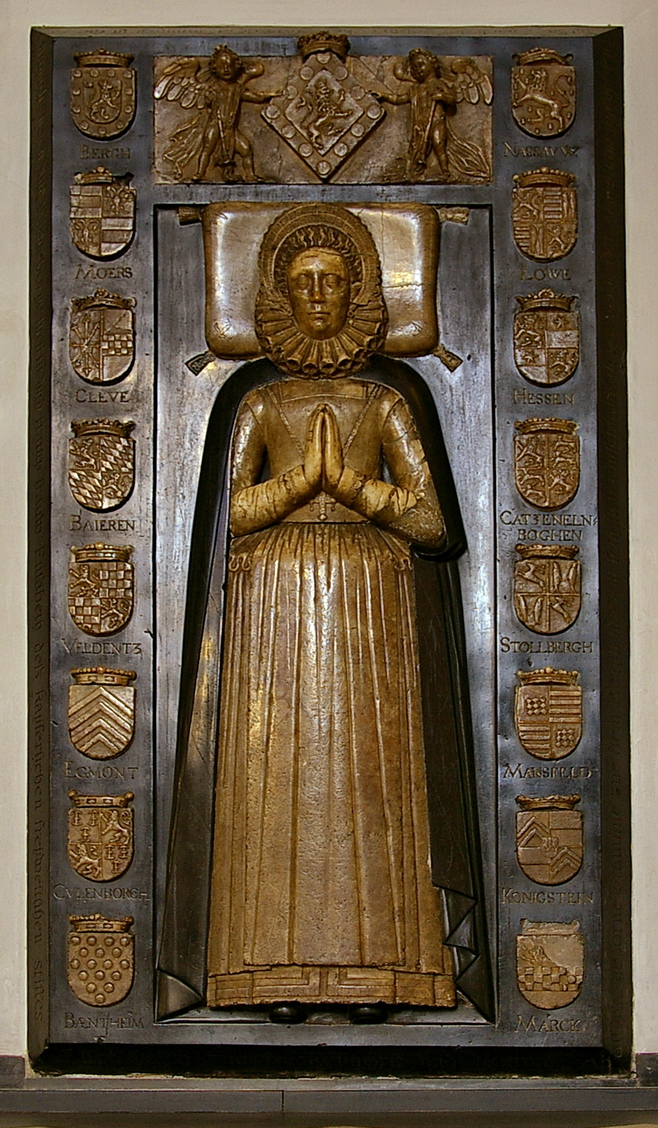
  The Grave of Maria's daughter, Elisabeth.
  Willem IV, Maria's Husband.
