= Philipp, Prince of Hohenzollern-Hechingen =

German nobleman

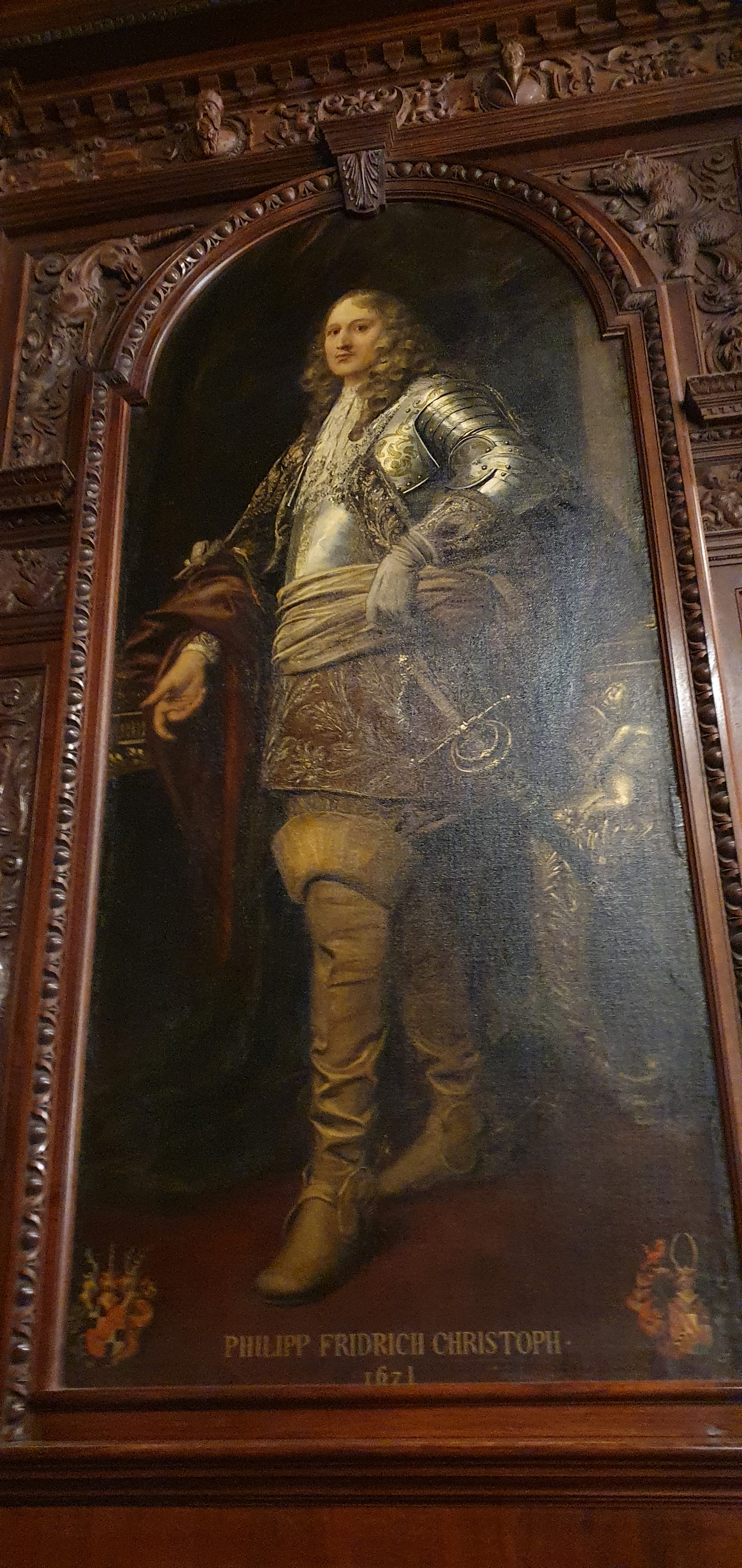
- Portrait of Philipp Friedrich Christoph by Gustav Klimt at Peleș Castle
- Born: 24 June 1616; Hechingen
- Died: 24 January 1671 (aged 54); Hechingen
- Noble family: House of Hohenzollern
- Spouse: Marie Sidonie of Baden-Rodemachern
- Father: Johann Georg, Prince of Hohenzollern-Hechingen
- Mother: Franciska of Salm-Neufville

Philipp Christoph Friedrich, Prince of Hohenzollern-Hechingen (24 June 1616 in Hechingen – 24 January 1671 in Hechingen) was a German nobleman. He was the third prince of Hohenzollern-Hechingen.

== Life ==
Philipp was the youngest son of Prince Johann Georg (1577–1623) from his marriage with Franziska (d. 1619), a daughter of Duke Friedrich I of Salm, Wild- and Rhinegrave in Neufville. As a younger son, Philipp was destinined for the church. He was a canon in Cologne and Strasbourg. He was considered a learned jurist and was the head of an imperial diplomatic mission to Spain.

When his eldest brother Eitel Friedrich V died in 1661, Philipp inherited the principality. Pope Alexander VII allowed him to revert to the lay state, in exchange for a payment of 4000 scudi. Strictly speaking, when the Counts of Hohenzollern-Hechingen were raised to Princes, only the firstborn sons had been given the right to inherit the princely title. However, because of everything the rulers of Hohenzollern-Hechingen had done while they were in the imperial service, Emperor Leopold I, extended the right to this title to Philipp. The Pope also gave the 50-year-old Philipp the dispensation he needed to marry in Baden-Baden on 12 November 1662 to Princess Marie Sidonie (1635–1686), a daughter of Margrave Herman Fortunatus of Baden-Rodemachern.

During his reign, Philipp suffered from a frail health, and in his later years, he was completely paralyzed. The principality had been financially and economically ruined by the Thirty Years' War and was slowly recovering, due in part to Philipp's modest court and the dowry his wife brought in. During his reign, industry, agriculture, trade, churches and schools began to blossom again.

== Issue ==
Philipp and Marie Sidonie had the following children:

- Friedrich Wilhelm (1663–1735), his heir, married:
  1. in 1687 to Countess Maria Leopoldine of Sinzendorf (1666–1709)
  2. in 1710 to Baroness Maximiliane Magdalene of Lützau (1690–1755)
- Herman Friedrich (1665–1733), Imperial Field Marshal, married:
  1. in 1704 to Princess Eleonore Magdalene of Brandenburg-Bayreuth (1673–1711), daughter of Christian Ernst, Margrave of Brandenburg-Bayreuth
  2. in 1714 to Countess Josepha of Oettingen-Spielberg (1694–1738)
- Karl Leopold (1666–1684), fell in the First Battle of Buda
- Philipp Friedrich (1667–1667)
- Maria Margaret (1668–1668)
- Sidonia (1670–1687)

Philipp, Prince of Hohenzollern-Hechingen House of Hohenzollern Born: 24 June 1616 Died: 24 January 1671
Preceded by Eitel Friedrich V	Prince of Hohenzollern-Hechingen; 1661–1671	Succeeded by Friedrich Wilhelm
