= Boxmeer Castle =

Castle in Boxmeer, Netherlands

- Kasteel Boxmeer
- Boxmeer, the Netherlands
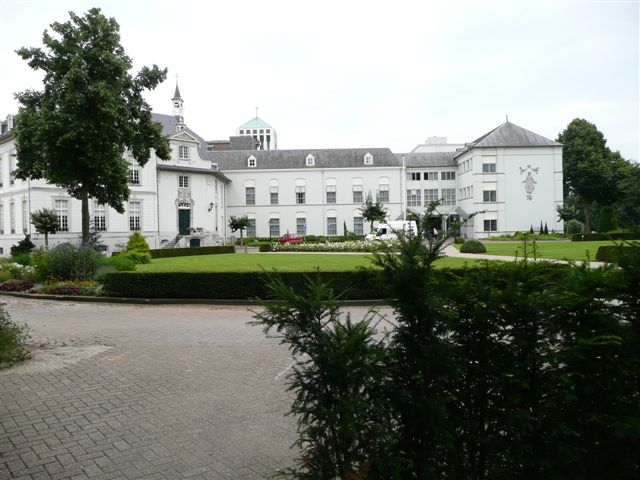
- Boxmeer Castle in 2008

Site information
- Type: Castle
- Owner: Sisters of Julie Postel
- Open to the public: Yes
- Condition: 17th century parts remain

Location
- The Netherlands
- Coordinates: 51.652284°N 5.958006°E

Site history
- Built: 13th century
- Demolished: medieval parts in c. 1780

Boxmeer Castle is an originally 13th century castle in Boxmeer, North-Brabant, Netherlands. It is situated on a former island in the Meuse.

== History ==
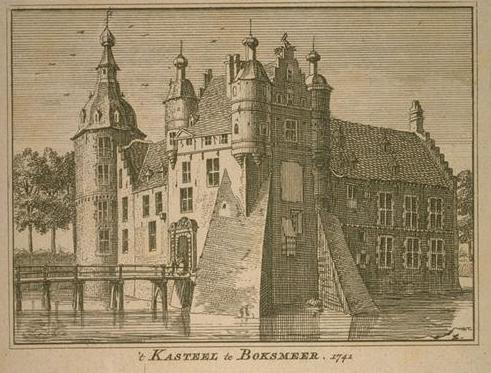
The castle in about 1742

It is not known when Boxmeer Castle was founded. In the late 13th century, Jan Boc I, lord of Boxmeer (Heerlijkheid Boxmeer) sided with the count of Guelders against the County of Holland. As a result, his castle 'Boc-Huys' was destroyed by Floris V, Count of Holland in 1284/85. In 1288 he was taken prisoner in the Battle of Worringen

In 1361 Peter van Culemborg, a younger son of Hubert, Lord of Culemborg married Johanna van Meer, and so came into possession of the Lordship of Boxmeer. During the Wars of the Loon Succession lord Peter of Culemborg fought on the Guelders side. In 1365 he sold Boxmeer to the Duke of Brabant, who razed the castle. In 1367 Peter got it back as a loan. The castle was rebuilt shortly after. The last male of this line of Lords of 'Meer' died in 1472. He was succeeded by his daughter Margriet van Meer. She left a daughter Anna van Egmondt (1480-1517).

Oswald van den Bergh and Jan van Virnenburg were the two sons of Anna van Egmondt, but by different fathers. After a long struggle for the succession, graaf Oswald van den Bergh became lord of Boxmeer in 1545. After his death in 1546, his sons Willem IV van den Bergh and Frederik fought about the succession. Willem seems to have been in possession of the castle till 1568. At the start of the Eighty Years' War (1568-1648) he fled the Netherlands.

In 1572 Willem van den Bergh commanded one of the little armies that invaded the Netherlands, and had some initial success. His opponent the Duke of Alba ordered the castle to be razed, so it did not have to be garrisoned. In 1575 Frederik van den Bergh occupied the deserted castle, and had himself acknowledged as Lord of Boxmeer. In 1576 the Pacification of Ghent allowed Willem to return to the Netherlands. In late September 1577 Willem then seized the castle by arms. The trouble with his brother only ended after the latter's childless death in 1597.

In 1712 Frans Wilhelm van den Bergh-Hohenzollern-Sigmaringen, second son of Meinrad II, Prince of Hohenzollern-Sigmaringen became the new lord of Boxmeer. One of the conditions to get the inheritance was that he added the name 'Van den Bergh' to his own. His son Johan Baptist van Hohenzollern-Sigmaringen (1728-1781) was jailed for murder in 1757, and so his older sister Joanna Josephina Antonia got authority over his lands. In 1782 she went to live at the castle. For that a big part was broken down, and two new wings were added to the castle in 1782. In 1787 Anton Aloys, Prince of Hohenzollern-Sigmaringen became the last Lord of Boxmeer.

In 1797 the Heerlijkheid Boxmeer was annexed by France. In 1800 it was then sold to the Batavian Republic. In 1806 the castle and grounds were sold to Jhr. Leopold van Sasse van Ysselt (1778-1844). He would demolish parts of the castle. In 1897 the castle was sold to the Sisters of Julie Postel, who founded a hospital on the grounds. In 1923 modern buildings were added to the castle. When Boxmeer got a hospital funded by the state, the castle became the care home Madeleine. The castle is now used by the care home Sint Anna.

== The Castle ==
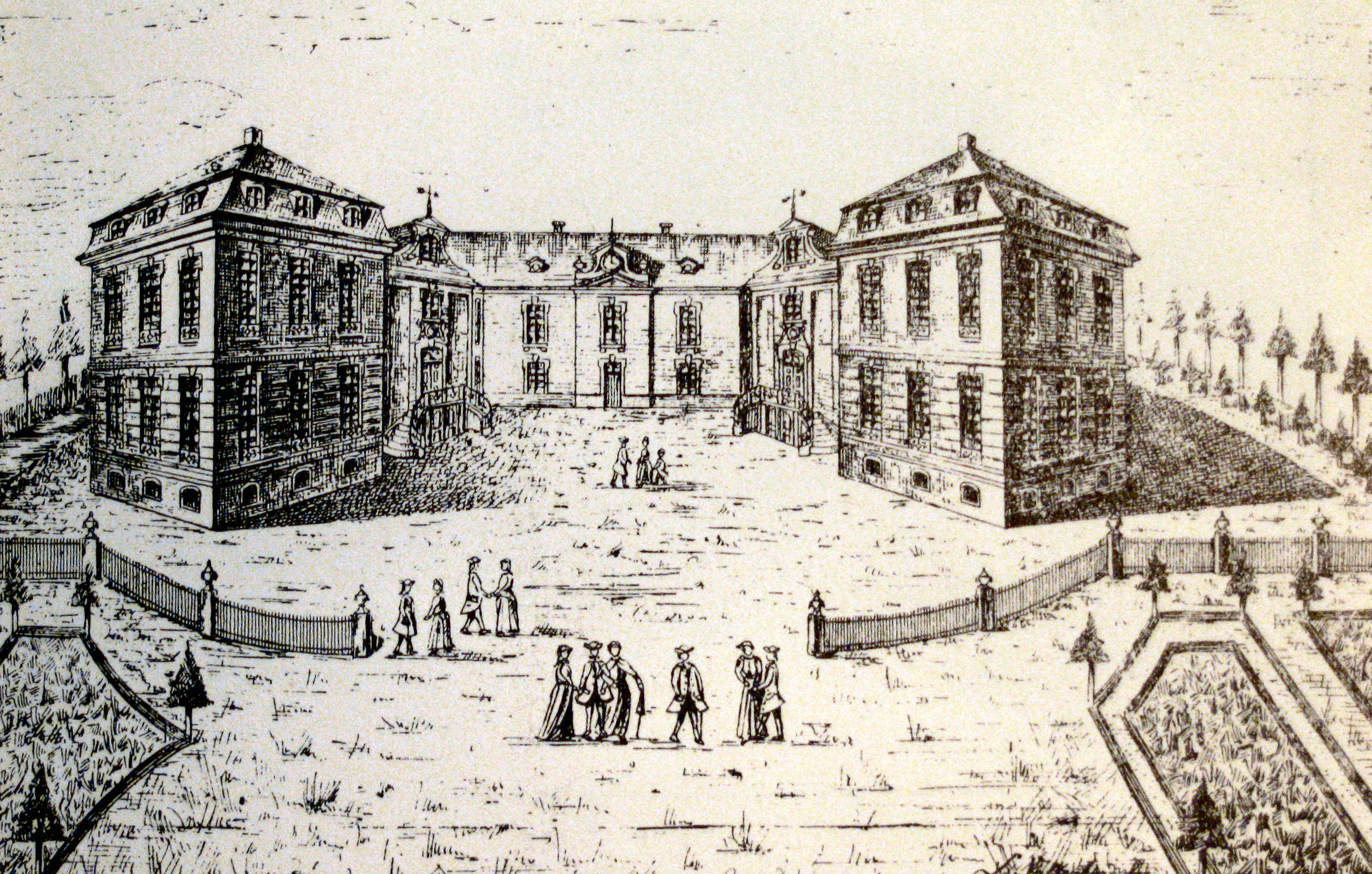
Boxmeer Castle in 1786

The medieval Boxmeer Castle was not necessarily that large. On old pictures it is shown as a rather irregular water castle. Ground plans and other pictures show that it had two moats. The first around the castle proper, the second around the castle and the outer bailey. It later developed into a fortress. A map dated between 1803 and 1820 shows the castle with 5 bastions. These bastions are also shown on pictures, and in the background of a picture.

At first sight, the current castle seems to consist of the remains of an 18th-century palace, but in fact it still contains many parts of the old castle. In 1782 Johanna Josephina of Hohenzollern-Sigmaringen changed the castle to a small Style Louis XV palace. She added the still existing protruding wing with the mansard roof and the part with the raised entrance to the old castle. This old part was plastered over to make it look like it was just as new, but on the inside, the part to the right of the 1782 parts is still 17th century.

On the west side, a similar wing was added to the old castle. However, this was constructed over the old inner moat of the castle. Already in 1802, this wing began to subside. It has since disappeared.

On the inside the 17th century part of the castle has a knight's hall on the first floor. It has a monumental stucco ceiling by J.C. Hansche, dated 1686. It depicts the arms of Oswald van den Bergh and his wife Maria Leopoldina of Oost-Friesland and Rittberg, who married that year. In the wing with the Mansard roof are some rooms with Louis XVI style stucco work, since restored extensively. The central stairs are richly decorated, also in Louis XVI style.

== Castle Museums ==
The castle houses two museums. In the basement, the municipal museum of Boxmeer contains a large collection of archaeological finds from the prehistory till medieval times. It depicts more recent history in pictures, paintings and photographs.

The other museum is Castle Museum Julie Postel. In the basement it has drawings and models depicting the history of the castle and its inhabitants. The later use of the castle by the Sisterhood as a hospital and later as care home, is depicted elsewhere in the castle. E.g. in a 19th-century hospital room, but also with artefacts like clothing, relics and pictures.
