= Eitel Frederick II of Hohenzollern-Hechingen =

Imperial General Eitel Frederick II Prince of Hohenzollern-Hechingen
- Coat of Arms of Hohenzollern-Hechingen.

Prince of Hohenzollern-Hechingen
- In office 1623–1661
- Preceded by: Johann Georg, Prince of Hohenzollern-Hechingen
- Succeeded by: Philipp, Prince of Hohenzollern-Hechingen (His Brother)

Prince of the Holy Roman Empire
- In office 1653–1661

Personal details
- Born: January 1601 Hechingen, Hohenzollern, Prussia
- Died: 11 July 1661 (60) Issenheim, Kingdom of France
- Spouse: Maria Van den Bergh
- Children: 1. Stilborn son 2. Henriette Francisca
- Parent(s): Johann Georg, Prince of Hohenzollern-Hechingen and Franziska Von Salms-Neufville

Eitel Frederick II of Hohenzollern-Hechingen (1601 – 11 July 1661) was the second Prince of Hohenzollern-Hechingen and an imperial general in the Thirty Years' War.

== Biography ==
Eitel Friedrich was the eldest son of Prince Johann Georg, Prince of Hohenzollern-Hechingen (1577–1623) and Countess Franziska von Salm-Neufville (d. 1619). His father placed particular emphasis on a good education and the prince was sent to the universities of Vienna and Ingolstadt for this purpose. Educational trips to Italy and France also followed.

Eitel Friedrich succeeded his father as Prince of Hohenzollern-Hechingen in 1623. He also commanded an infantry regiment in the service of Emperor Ferdinand II. Eitel Friedrich was loyal to the Catholic Church and therefore supported the Habsburgs during the Thirty Years' War.
His power base, the Hohenzollern Castle, was strategically highly significant. The principality was surrounded by Protestant neighbors. In the war, the fortress developed into a focal point and was besieged and devastated by the Swedes and Württembergers in 1634. The castle was recaptured by Imperial troops the next year, and remained under Habsburg control until 1798 against a payment of 5,000 guilders annually.
The Thirty Years' War had impoverished the people in Hohenzollern-Hechingen and Eitel Friedrich was also faced with serious financial problems, forcing him to sell several attractive fiefs.

In 1653, Eitel Friedrich became a Prince of the Holy Roman Empire and was admitted to the Imperial Diet in Regensburg.
In 1661, Eitel Friedrich was wounded in České Budějovice and died shortly after. He left no male heirs and was succeeded as a Prince by his brother Philipp.

=== Marriage and children ===
On 19 March 1630, he married in Boutersem Maria Elisabeth II van den Bergh (1613–1671), daughter of Hendrik van den Bergh and Margravine of Bergen Op Zoom. With her he had the following children:

- Stillborn son (1632)
- Franziska (1642–1698), Margravine of Bergen Op Zoom, married Frédéric Maurice, son of Frédéric Maurice de La Tour d'Auvergne, Duc de Bouillon

== Sources ==
- Gustav Schilling: Geschichte des Hauses Hohenzollern, F. Fleischer, 1843, Page 228.
- Heinrich August Pierer: Pierer's Universal-Lexikon der Vergangenheit und Gegenwart: oder, Neuestes encyclopädisches Wörterbuch der Wissenschaften, Künste und Gewerbe, Band 8, 1859, S. 465 (Google Books)
- Johann Samuel Ersch: Allgemeine Encyclopädie der Wissenschaften und Künste, J. f. Gleditsch, 1832, S. 418 (Google Books)

Eitel Frederick II of Hohenzollern-Hechingen House of Hohenzollern Born: 1601 Died: 11 July 1661
Preceded by Johann Georg	Count of Hohenzollern-Hechingen; 1623–1661	Succeeded by Philipp
