= Herman van den Bergh =

Dutch nobleman and military commander (1558–1611)

Herman, Count van den Bergh (2 August 1558 in Huis Bergh, 's-Heerenberg, Gelderland – 12 August 1611 in Spa) was a Dutch soldier in the Eighty Years' War, knight of the Order of the Golden Fleece and stadtholder of Spanish Guelders.

== Life ==
In 1584 he, his brothers Frederik and Hendrik and their father Willem IV van den Bergh joined the Spanish side in the War, though Herman was still active in States service as a captain and garrison commander active 's Heerenberg and Doetinchem. Whilst on the Spanish side Herman was more active in the 1591 Siege of Deventer, which surrendered to Maurice of Nassau after ten days. Two years later, in 1593, Herman was promoted to stadhouder of Spanish Guelders.
