= Hendrik van den Bergh (count) =

German count and field marshal of the Dutch States Army (1592–1642)

Count Hendrik van den Bergh Lord of Stevensweert
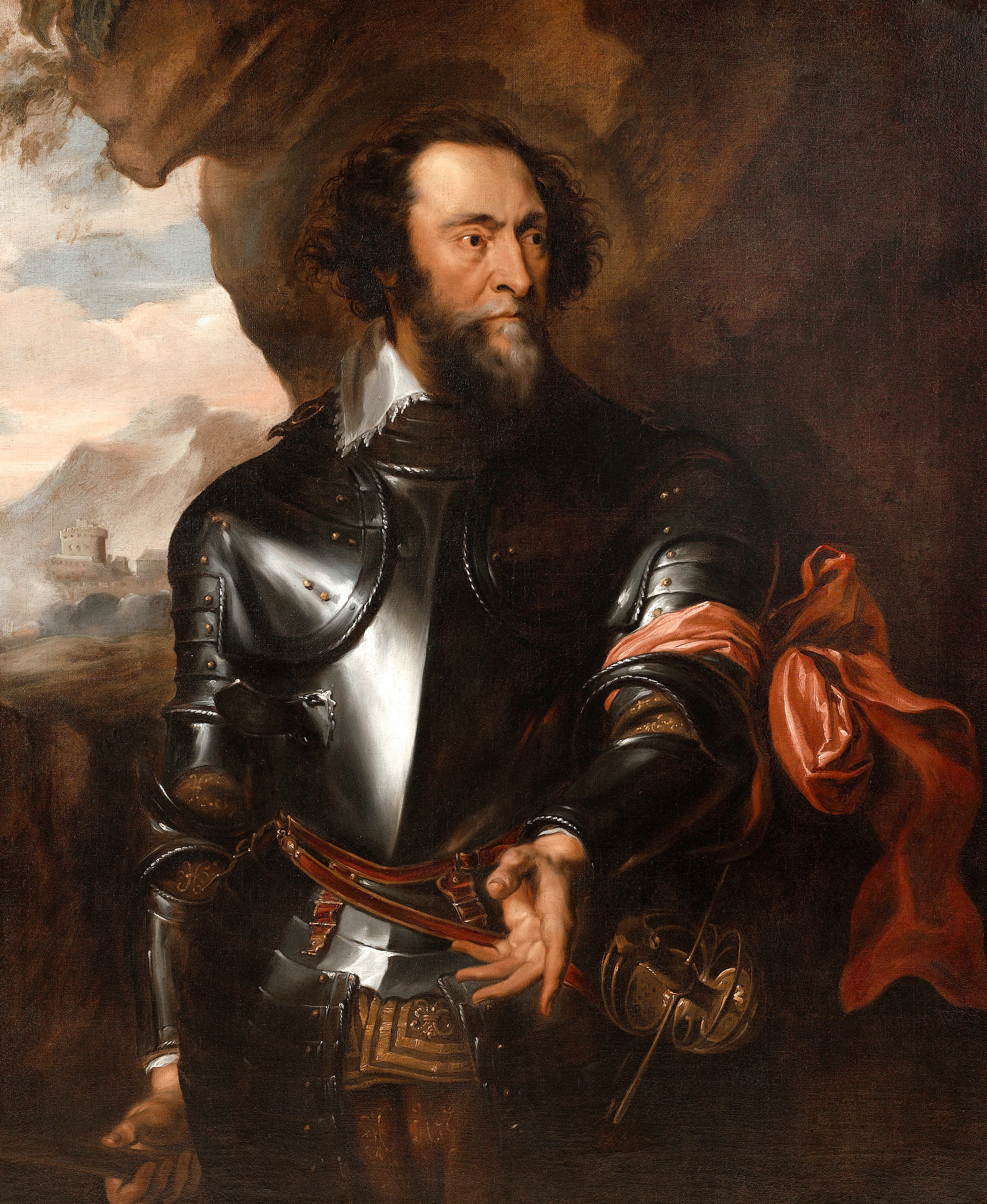
- Hendrik van den Bergh by Van Dyck, around 1628, shown holding a commander's baton; this may have been painted to celebrate his promotion as Maestre de campo

Stadtholder of Upper Guelders
- In office 1618–1637
- Preceded by: Frederik van den Bergh
- Succeeded by: Guillaume de Bette

Personal details
- Born: 1573 Bremen, Holy Roman Empire
- Died: 22 May 1638 (aged 64) Elburg, Gelderland
- Spouse(s): (1) Unknown (2) 1612–1627 Margaretha van Wittem (Her death) (3) 1629–1638 Hiëronyma Catharina (His death)
- Children: (1) Anna Maria (1600-1653); Herman Frederik (1600-1669) (2) Maria Van den Bergh (1613-1671); Herman Oswald (1614-1622) (3) Elisabeth Catharina (1632-1681); Amalia Lucia (1633-1711); Mary Agnes; Anna Carolina; Wilhelmina Juliana (1638-1714)
- Parent(s): Willem IV van den Bergh; Maria of Nassau
- Occupation: Soldier and statesman

Military service
- Allegiance: Habsburg Spain until 1632; Dutch Republic 1632–1638
- Battles/wars: Eighty Years War; Siege of Groenlo (1606); Siege of Jülich (1621–1622); Breda; Siege of Groenlo (1627); Siege of 's-Hertogenbosch

Hendrik van den Bergh, (Note: German: Heinrich von dem Bergh) c. 1573 to 22 May 1638, was a professional soldier and lord of Stevensweert, in Limburg. From 1618 to 1637 he was also stadtholder of Upper Guelders, the only part of Guelders to remain loyal to Habsburg Spain during the Eighty Years War.

A brave and resourceful cavalry commander, he spent most of his career with the Spanish Army of Flanders and became its Maestre de campo in 1628. Accused of treachery after the loss of Den Bosch in 1629, he defected to the Dutch Republic following the 1632 Conspiracy of Nobles.

== Personal details ==
Hendrik was born in 1573, sixth surviving son of Willem IV van den Bergh (1537—1586) and Maria of Nassau (1539—1599), eldest sister of William the Silent. One of nine sons and eight daughters, his siblings included Herman (1558—1611), Frederik (1559—1618), Oswald (1561—1586), Adam (1563—1590), Adolf (1571—1609), Lodewijk (1572—1592) and Catharina (1578—1640).

Before his marriage in 1612 to Margaretha van Wittem (1580—1627), Hendrik had two children, Anna Maria Elisabeth (1600—1653) and Herman Frederik (1600—1669), who married Josina Walburgis of Löwenstein-Rochefort; although he acknowledged both, they do not appear in the family genealogy, so may have been illegitimate.
He and Margaretha had

- a daughter, Maria Elisabeth (1613—1671), later married Eitel Frederick II, Prince of Hohenzollern-Hechingen,
- and a son, Herman Oswald (1614—1622).

Two years after her death in 1627, he married again, this time to Hiëronyma Catharina, Countess of Spaur-Flavon (1600—1683), and they had five daughters; Elisabeth Catharina (1632—1681), Amalia Lucia (1633—1711), Mary Agnes, Anna Carolina, and Wilhelmina Juliana (1638—1714).

== Career ==
At the beginning of the Dutch Revolt against Spain in 1566, his father Willem IV was among those who supported Protestant demands for greater religious freedom. Charged by the Spanish government with treason and heresy, his estates were seized and Willem fled to Bremen, where Hendrik was born in 1573. Willem returned home in 1576 after an amnesty and in 1581 was appointed stadtholder of Guelders by the States General of the Netherlands. Arrested by the Dutch for suspected treason in 1583, he joined the Spanish in 1584 and died in 1586.

The Spanish Netherlands and Dutch Republic; key locations in article (Note; using modern borders)

Hendrik followed his father into the Spanish Army of Flanders, as did his brothers, four of whom died on active service; Oswald at Boksum in 1586, Adam at Groningen in 1590, Lodewijk at Steenwijk in 1592, and Adolf in 1609. In 1595, he was seized by Dutch troops outside Weert, and released only after paying a large ransom; he later took part in the 1606 capture of Groenlo, but was taken prisoner again in 1607 near Roermond. In 1618, he succeeded his elder brother Fredrik as Stadtholder of Upper Guelders, which along with its capital Geldern (Note: Now in the modern German state of North Rhine-Westphalia) was the only part of Guelders that remained loyal to Spain, rather than joining the Dutch province of Gelderland.

When the Dutch War resumed in 1621 following the end of the Twelve Years' Truce, Hendrik served as deputy to the Spanish commander Ambrogio Spinola and took part in the sieges of Jülich, Breda and Groenlo. Frustrated by what he perceived as Madrid's failure to provide enough money and men, Spinola resigned in January 1628 and Hendrik was appointed Maestre de campo of the Army of Flanders. The promotion of a Netherlandish "native" was intended to placate critics of the Spanish administration in Brussels, but Hendrik also acquired numerous enemies, many of them disappointed competitors.

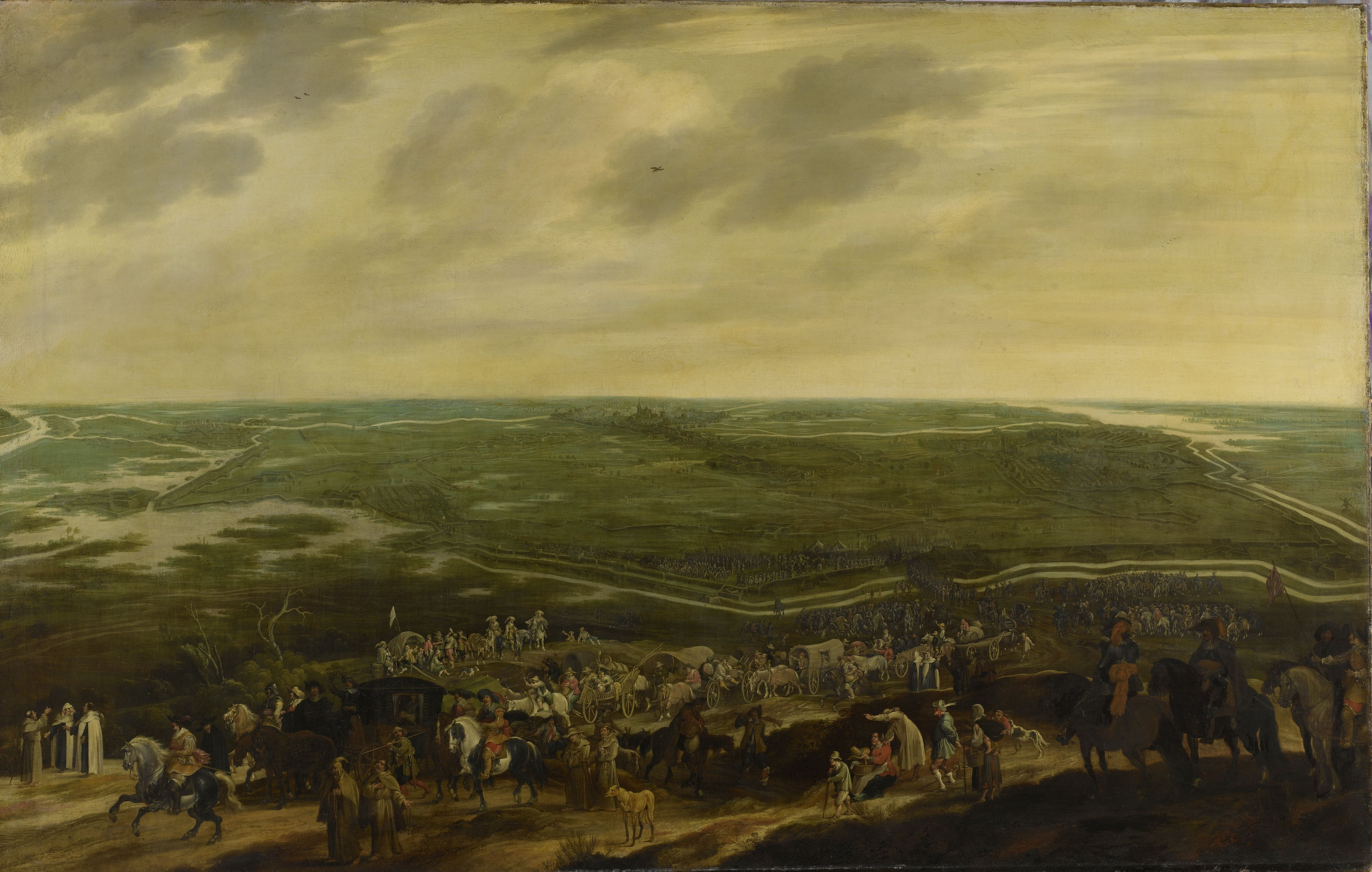
The Spanish garrison leave Den Bosch after its surrender in 1629; Van der Bergh was blamed for its loss

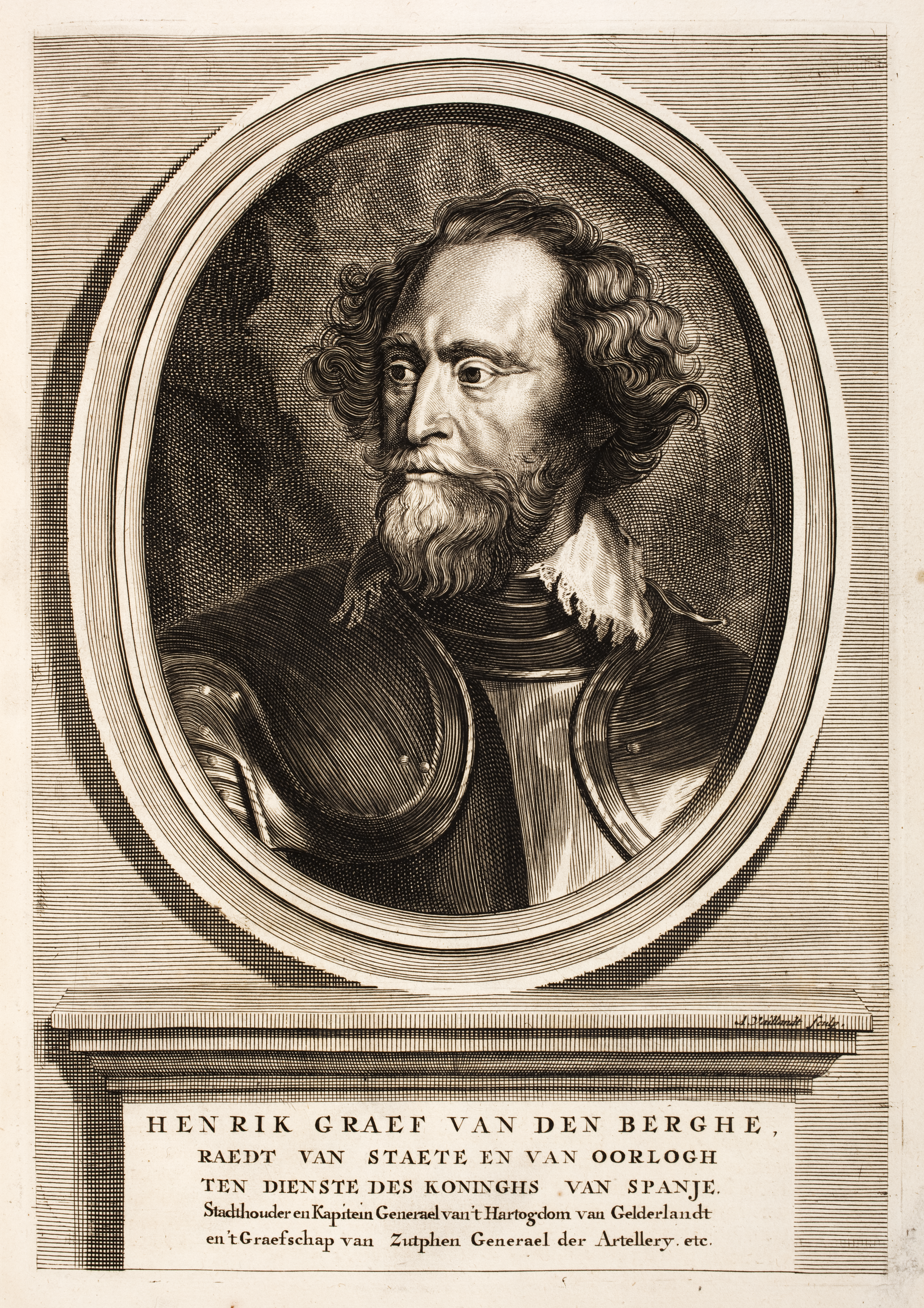
Hendrik van den Bergh in Nederlandtsche Jaerboeken

His financial problems worsened when a Dutch squadron captured the Spanish treasure fleet at Matanzas in September 1628; this meant Spanish troops went unpaid, while the Dutch used the windfall to fund an attack on Den Bosch in 1629. Deciding their siege lines were too strong to assault directly, Hendrik tried to force Frederick Henry, Prince of Orange, to lift the siege through a series of diversionary attacks, including an invasion of the Veluwe which he led in person. These achieved little and Den Bosch surrendered in August 1629, a significant setback for the Spanish cause.

Dutch military success, plus growing discontent with Spanish management of the war and its cost, meant elements within the Southern Netherlands now began seeking to end it. Hendrik had several incentives for joining them, one being that his domestic opponents blamed him for the loss of Den Bosch, while estates owned by his wife outside the city had been confiscated by the Dutch. The plotters originally planned to re-unite the largely Catholic and loyalist south with the Protestant dominated rebels in the north, but support for this option crumbled due to the mistreatment of Catholics in Den Bosch by their Calvinist conquerors.

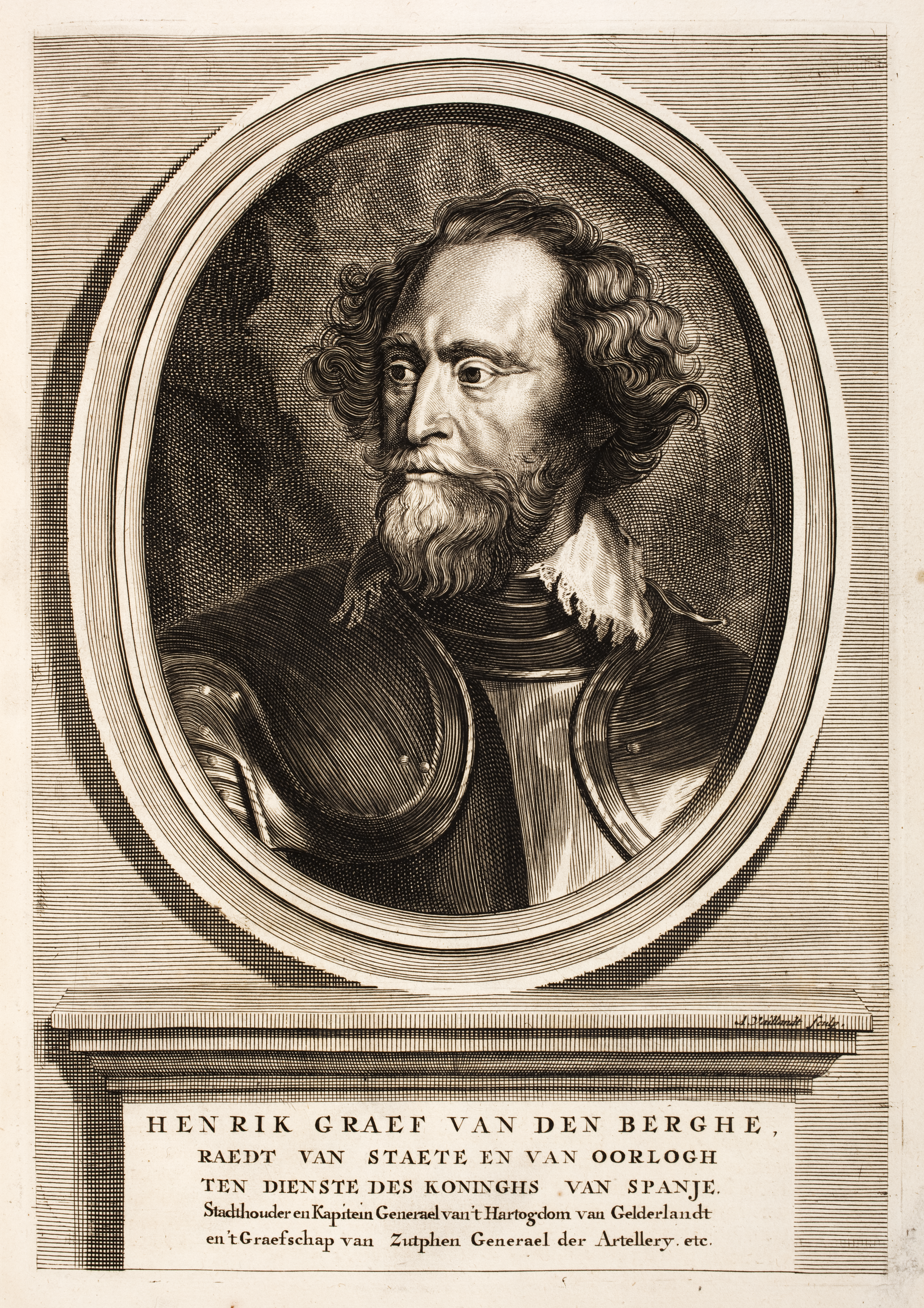
Hendrik van den Bergh in Nederlandtsche Jaerboeken

In April 1632, Hendrik and René de Renesse, 1st Count of Warfusée, organised an alternative plot known as the Conspiracy of Nobles. This would have divided the Spanish Netherlands between the Dutch Republic and France, simultaneously ousting the Spanish and ending the war, while protecting Catholic rights in the south. The plotters published a manifesto explaining their ideas but could not rally sufficient support to threaten the Brussels government. They also held secret talks with Frederick Henry, who was persuaded to abandon plans to attack Antwerp, and move instead against Maastricht. The town surrendered on 26 August 1632, an outcome made considerably easier when Hendrik made no attempt to defend Roermond or Venlo.

By engineering the loss of Maastricht, Hendrik and Warfusée had hoped to increase discontent with the Spanish and thus support for a negotiated solution, but while a serious blow, it failed to achieve this. Hendrik fled to neutral Liège, where he unsuccessfully continued his attempts to incite a revolt and joined the Dutch States Army in 1633. However, his past record and that of his father meant the Dutch did not fully trust him, while he was replaced as Stadtholder of Upper Guelders by Guillaume de Bette, a Spanish loyalist. He retired to Elburg in 1634, where he died on 22 May 1638.

== Sources ==
- Lem, Anton van der. "Willem IV graaf van den Bergh Nederlands edelman, stadhouder van Gelderland 1581-1583". Leiden University.
- Lem, Anton van der (2018). Revolt in the Netherlands: The Eighty Years War, 1568-1648. Reaktion Books. ISBN 978-1789140866.
- Limm, Peter (1989). The Dutch Revolt, 1559-1648. Longman. ISBN 9780582355941.
- Molhuysen, P.C; Blok, P.J, eds. (1930). Nieuw Nederlandsch Biografisch Woordenboek, Volume 8 (in Dutch). A.W. Sijthoffs.
- Steen, Jasper van der (2015). Memory Wars in the Low Countries, 1566-1700. Brill. ISBN 978-9004300491.
- Steen, Jasper van der (2017). "The Conspiracy of the Nobility in 1632 in The Political Rediscovery of the Dutch Revolt in the Seventeenth-Century Habsburg Netherlands". Early Modern Low Countries. 1 (2): 297–317. doi:10.18352/emlc.28.
