= Johann Jacob Grasser =

Swiss poet and historian (1579–1627)

Johann Jacob Grasser (24 February 1579 – 20 March 1627) was a scholar and polyhistor of Basel. He studied theology and was active as a poet, in the sciences and in geography. He was Magister Artium and Poeta laureatus in Basel in 1601. He travelled across Switzerland and in Europe during 1603 to 1608. When he was in Nîmes, he wrote a treatise on the Roman antiquities there which was reprinted several times. In 1607, he was given the title of Count Palatine by the Imperial Commissioner in Padua, from which time he styled himself as Ioannes Iacobus Grasserus, Civis Romanus, Comes Palatinus.

He was pastor in Bennwil and Hölstein during 1610 to 1612, and sacristan at St. Theodore church in Basel during 1612 to 1627. He published various editions and translations, besides his own works of moderate Calvinist theology, historiography and travel literature. His 1624 Swiss Heldenbuch is without historiographical value but noted for its social criticism.

== Works ==
- 1607 (on the Roman antiquities at Nîmes) De antiquitatibus Nemausensibus dissertatio
  - repeatedly reprinted, in 1614 with some of Grasser's poetry, Poëmata: accessit De antiquitatibus Nemausensibus dissertatio
- 1610 (travel literature) Newe und volkommne Italianische Frantzösische und Englische Schatzkamer: Das ist: Wahrhaffte und eigendtliche Beschreibung aller Stätten in Italia Sicilia Sardinia Corsica Franckreich Engelland und darumb ligenden Provintzen: wie auch der denckwürdigsten Sachen so sich daselbsten jemahln zugetragen
- 1618 (theology) Speculum theologiae mysticae. Sive Dissertationes, et meditationes allegoricae: quibus pleraque vtriusque testamenti mysteria, ex ipsis sacris literis, patribus, aliisque tam modernis, quam veteribus doctoribus varios in usus explicantur & illustrantur
- 1618 (pamphlet) Petri Calvi tridentini jur. utriusq. doct. oratio renuntiatoria, Basileae
- 1619 (pamphlet on the Great Comet of 1618) Christliches Bedencken vber den Erschrockenlichen Cometen, So verschienen Novemb. Vnd Decemb. Ann. 1618 (1664 ed. Christenliches Bedencken auch natuerlicher, historischer und schrifftmaessigen Bericht von dem erschrocklichen Cometen der in dem ausslauffenden 1618. Jahr sich in Europa sehen lassen)
- 1624 (historiography) Schweitzerisch Helden Buch: darinn die denkwürdigste Thaten und Sachen gemeiner loblicher Eydgnossschafft, alss Regiments Enderungen, Befreyungen, Krieg, Schlachten, Vertrag, Bündnussen, und andre namhaffte Handlungen, wie zugleich der fürnembsten Patrioten Lebensbeschreibungen : nicht nur auss allerhandt getruckten : sondern auch auss drey fürnemmen alten geschriebenen Chronicken, zu auffmunterung der alten Eydgnosssischen Dapfferkeit, und Beschirmung der theror erworbenen Freyheit
- 1623 (historiography) Waldenser Chronick von den Verfolgungen so die Waldenser, Albigenser, Picarder und Hussiten
- 1624 (historiography) Historischer Lustgarten: Mit den denckwürdigsten Historien und Sachen gezieret, etc
- 1624 (historiography, geography)Itinerarium historico-politicum, quod ex inclyta ad Moen. Francofordia per celebriores Helvetiae et regni Arelatensis urbes in uniuersam extenditur Italiam
- (1636) (pamphlet) Ein Christenliche Trewhertzige wolmeynende warnung, Anmahnung vnd erjnerrung: An alle Menschen
- (1672) (theology) Christlicher In Gottes Wort gegründeter aber mißdeuteter und übel auffgenommener Predigten erstes Par: Worinnen gehandelt wird Erstlich/ Vom Ampt der Kirchen und Seelen-Wachtern. Auß dem Propheten Ezechiel c. 3. v. 17- 21. Demnach von dem Danck/ welchen getreue Prediger und Seelen-Wachter von der Welt/ gemeinlich zu gewarten haben. Auß dem Propheten Amos c. 7, v. 10-17.

editions

- 1605 Polyhistor vel Rerum toto orbe memorabilium thesaurus (Gaius Julius Solinus)
- 1609 P. Papinii Statii opera quae extant omnia (Publius Papinius Statius)
- 1617 Epithetorum opus perfectissimum (Ravisius Textor)

translations

- 1610 Opera didactica, Lehr- u. Trostreicher Tractat (Pierre Dumoulin)
- 1615 Zwo merckliche und dieser Zeit sehr lesenswürdige Missiven: Eine an König in Frankreich, die andre an Papst zu Rom : Betreffendt ein wohlbedenckliche Reformation der Jesuiten (Théophile Raynaud)

== Sources ==
- Karin Marti-Weissenbach: Johann Jacob Grasser in German, French and Italian in the online Historical Dictionary of Switzerland, 2005.
- A.R. Weber, 'Johann Jacob Grasser (1579-1627)', in BZGA 89, 1989, 41-133.
