= Willem IV van den Bergh =

Stadtholder of Guelders and Zutphen (1581-1583)

Willem IV van den bergh
- Willem IV, Count Van den Bergh

Stadtholder of Guelders
- In office 5 June 1581 – 5 November 1583
- Monarch: States General
- Preceded by: Jan I of Nassau

Stadtholder of Guelders
- In office 5 November 1583 – 1586
- Monarch: King of Spain

Personal details
- Born: 24 December 1537 's-Heerenberg
- Died: 6 November 1586 (aged 48) Ulft
- Spouse: Maria of Nassau (1539–1599)
- Profession: Soldier; statesman

Willem IV, Count van den Bergh (1537-1586) was the Dutch Stadtholder of Guelders and Zutphen from 1581 until his arrest for treason in 1583.

== Biography ==
=== Early years ===
Coat of Arms of Willem IV

Willem was the son of Count Oswald II van den Bergh and Elisabeth van Dorth. He spent time in Brussels at the court of Mary of Austria (1505–1558), then Regent of the Habsburg Netherlands. Here he became acquainted with his contemporary William the Silent, Prince of Orange, and married his eldest sister, Maria of Nassau, on 11 November 1556 at Moers.

=== Start of the Eighty Years' War ===
In 1566 Willem was a prominent member of the League of Nobles (also known as the Compromis) that presented a petition of grievances about the suppression of heresy to the Brussels government of the new Regent Margaret of Parma (who acted for her brother Philip II of Spain). He could not be present himself, but did join the meeting in Breda on 1 February 1567, and that in Antwerp on 4 February.

This prominence put him at odds with Fernando Álvarez de Toledo, 3rd Duke of Alba, who succeeded Margaret as governor-general of the Netherlands in 1567. Alba and started a program of repression. Together with a number of other "ringleaders", like the Prince of Orange, Willem was indicted before the Council of Troubles. He fled to Bremen with his family, and came in close contact with the leaders of the rebels. His many possessions in the Netherlands were sequestered.

In 1572 Willem commanded one of the little armies of mercenaries that invaded the Netherlands. These were financed by his brother-in-law the Prince of Orange. Willem was initially successful, and quickly conquered Doetinchem, Zutphen, Deventer, Zwolle, Kampen, and Steenwijk. These cities then greeted him as Stadholder of Guelders for the Prince of Orange. However, he was not able to withstand the onslaught of the Spanish troops under Alba's son Fadrique Álvarez de Toledo, 4th Duke of Alba. It led to the siege and bloodbath of Zutphen in November 1572, and a subsequent total failure of his campaign.

=== Wavering loyalty ===
Willem benefitted from the amnesty of the 1576 Pacification of Ghent. He was able to return to the Netherlands and to regain part of his forfeited possessions. Meanwhile his younger brother Frederik had been allotted Hedel and Boxmeer by Requesens. Willem then had the citizens of 's-Hertogenbosch chase his brother from Hedel Castle. In September 1577 Willem seized Boxmeer Castle by arms, inflicting some deathly casualties. On 28 February 1579 this action was condemned by the court in Brussel, still under control of the Republican side.

Willem had hoped to be appointed Stadtholder of Gelderland on behalf of the States-General of the Netherlands. This ambition was initially thwarted when his other brother-in-law Johann VI, Count of Nassau-Dillenburg got the post on 10 March 1578. Disaffected by this disappointment he secretly approached the new royal governor-general of the Netherlands, Alexander Farnese, Duke of Parma with the object of becoming the royal stadtholder of Guelders. However, by late 1579 Willem was far from an agreement with Spain. While Willem came ever closer to the Spanish party, Johann resigned the office of Stadtholder in 1581. In November 1581 Willem was then appointed stadtholder for the rebellious States-General. It is quite possible that Willem now again became a sincere adherent of the Republican side.

=== Arrested for treason ===
In September 1583 the sudden seizure of Zutphen by the Spanish side cast suspicion on the stadtholder of Guelders. On 5 November 1583 Willem, his wife and younger sons and servants were taken prisoner, and their papers sequestered. The action was led by the chancellor of Guelders, Elbertus Leoninus. Willem was first sent to Dordrecht, then to Zaltbommel, and finally to Delfshaven. Willem was not released till March 1584.

Willem was released after he promised to retire to his castle in Ulft and to remain neutral in the conflict. In light of the evidence that was found, this was an incredibly lenient treatment. A possible explanation is that he was blackmailed by contacts from the time before he became stadholder.

=== Joins the Royalist side ===
In late 1584 Willem openly joined the Royalist side together with his sons. He died at Ulft Castle in Ulft in 1586.

== Offspring ==
Some of Willem's children:

- Count Herman van den Bergh (1558–1611),
- Count Frederik (1559–1618),
- Count Oswald III (1561-1586),
- Count Hendrik van den Berg (1573–1638) he ended up defecting from the Spanish to the States side.
