= Frederik van den Bergh =

Soldier in the Eighty Years' War (1559–1618)

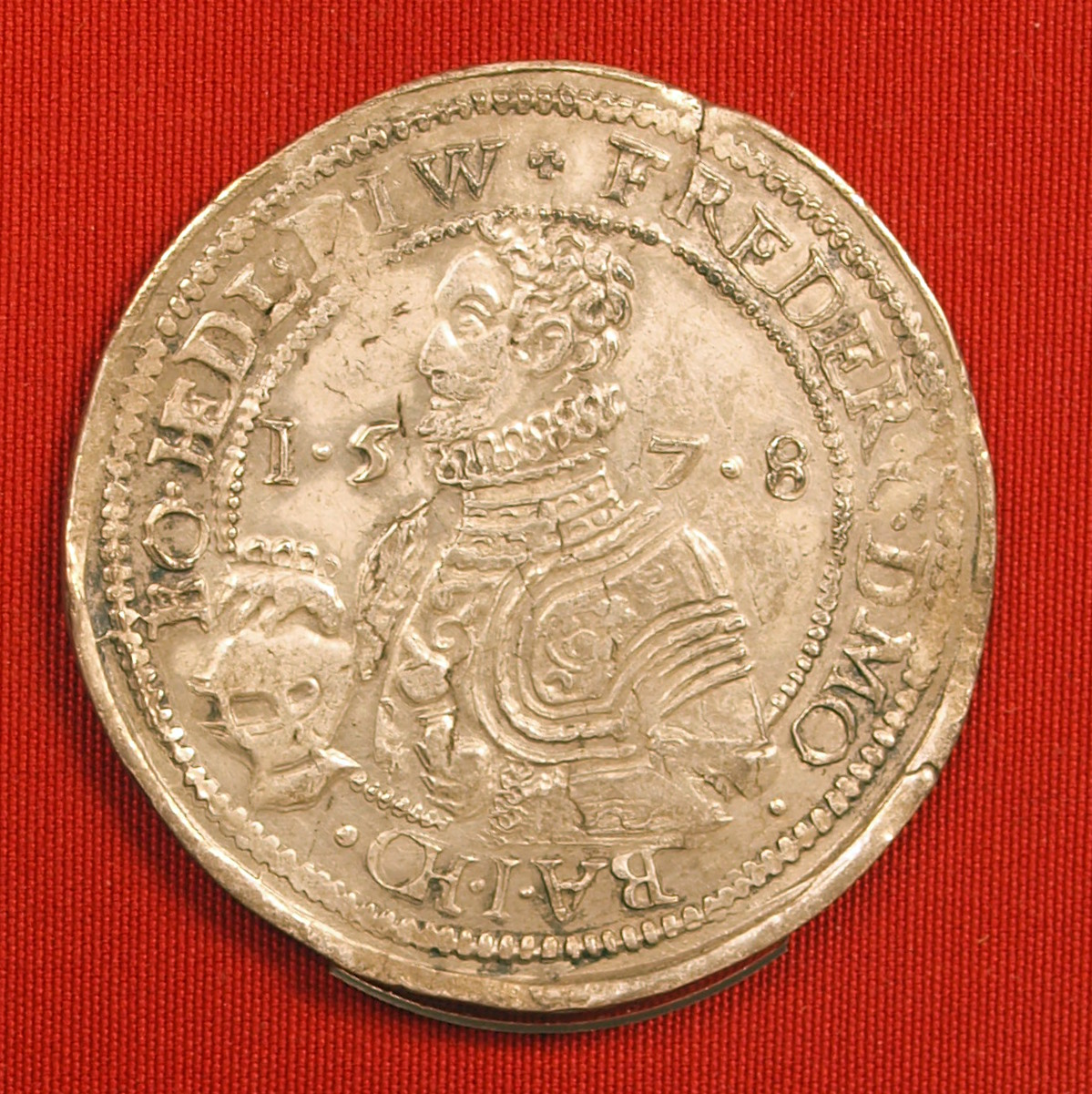
Daalder showing Frederik van den Bergh, 1578

Frederik van den Bergh (18 August 1559 – 3 September 1618) was a soldier in the Eighty Years' War. His titles included Lord of Boxmeer.

== Life ==
Frederik van den Bergh was born in Ulft. He first fought on the Dutch side of the conflict. In 1582 he was promoted to ritmeester gaining control of a cavalry unit. A year later he became governor of Venlo, handing command of his cavalry to his brother. In 1584 he, his brothers Herman and Hendrik and their father Willem IV van den Bergh went over to the Spanish side in the war because they weren’t happy with their career possibilities.

One of his first actions in Spanish service was taking part in the Siege of Grave in 1586. He was shot in the leg during this action. In 1586 he recovered and took part in an assault on Nijmegen. He was hit on the head by a falling stone passing out and missing the rest of that action. He played a major role in action at the Ijssel near Zutphen where he defended a ramp on the West Bank of the river against Dutch attacks. Next he served at Groningen during the winter of 1587 where he commanded a Spanish unit successfully. He distinguished himself when he successfully evacuated his unit from the east to the west bank of the Dollard river. This crossing was made dangerous because of floating ice in the river. Next he took part in breaking the siege of Groningen.

He took part in the 1592 siege of Coevorden, where he and 1,900 men unsuccessfully defended the city against the numerically superior force of Maurice of Orange. Immediately recognizing that his small force couldn’t protect the city against the Dutch army, Frederik abandoned the city and set it ablaze. He would fortify himself in the keep. He capitulated in September after a weeks-long siege, most of his demands were met in this negotiated surrender.

In 1593 he marched with 6,000 from Twente to Groningen but his way was blocked to the west of the city by an army under William Louis of Nassau-Dillenburg, a brilliant commander who played an important role in the military revolution of Maurice of Orange and Gustavus Adolphus. Soon after, battle commenced at Tolbert. During the battle, two horses were killed and he was shot in the arm.

His cavalry unit now became part of his brother Herman’s cavalry regiment. In 1595 he assisted in breaking the siege of Grol against Maurice of Orange, an action in which Herman also played a role.

He was made stadholder of Frisia, Groningen, Drenthe, Overijssel and Lingen. He governed from Lingen and held this position from 1595 until Maurice of Orange won a two-week long siege of the city on 12 November 1597.

In 1598 he conquered Doetinchem and Schuilenburg castle. A new lordship would have been created in Doetinchem and granted to him as a reward but Gelre and Zutphen refused to recognize it.

In 1597 he attempted to take Steenwijk. He also took part in the siege of Zaltbommel. In 1598 he was promoted to general-fieldmarshal. In 1600 he took part in the battle of Nieuwpoort and the siege of Oostende. He also took part in the siege of 's-Hertogenbosch of 1601 against Maurice of Orange and William Louis of Nassau-Dillenburg were his personal actions compelled them to retreat to prevent an open battle. 2 years later he again succeeded defending ‘s-Hertogenbosch from Maurice of Orange. He was promoted to captain of the archdukes personal guard, the archduke governing the Netherlands. At the same time he was made the commander of all Spanish troops in Flanders. He was successful and won victory after victory in this position, putting Spain in a favourable military position when the twelve year’s truce was signed.

In 1604 he was made stadholder of Artesia (Comté d'Artois), a post he held until 1611. He was stadholder of Upper Guelders from 1611 to 1618. When Spanish troops retook some of the territory he governed in the north he also reclaimed his position as stadholder there.

== Personal life and death ==
He died 3 September 1618, in Boxmeer.
